= List of human protein-coding genes 6 =

Human protein-coding genes listed in the HGNC database
index	Gene symbol	HGNC and UniProt ID(s)
11251	OR5AN1	HGNC:15255; Q8NGI8
11252	OR5AP2	HGNC:15258; Q8NGF4
11253	OR5AR1	HGNC:15260; Q8NGP9
11254	OR5AS1	HGNC:15261; Q8N127
11255	OR5AU1	HGNC:15362; Q8NGC0
11256	OR5B2	HGNC:8323; Q96R09
11257	OR5B3	HGNC:8324; Q8NH48
11258	OR5B12	HGNC:15432; Q96R08
11259	OR5B17	HGNC:15267; Q8NGF7
11260	OR5B21	HGNC:19616; A6NL26
11261	OR5BS1	HGNC:19627; A0A2R8YED5
11262	OR5C1	HGNC:8331; Q8NGR4
11263	OR5D3	HGNC:8336
11264	OR5D13	HGNC:15280; Q8NGL4
11265	OR5D14	HGNC:15281; Q8NGL3
11266	OR5D16	HGNC:15283; Q8NGK9
11267	OR5D18	HGNC:15285; Q8NGL1
11268	OR5F1	HGNC:8343; O95221
11269	OR5G3	HGNC:15287; P0C626
11270	OR5H1	HGNC:8346; A6NKK0
11271	OR5H2	HGNC:14752; Q8NGV7
11272	OR5H6	HGNC:14767; Q8NGV6
11273	OR5H8	HGNC:14773; P0DN80
11274	OR5H14	HGNC:31286; A6NHG9
11275	OR5H15	HGNC:31287; A6NDH6
11276	OR5I1	HGNC:8347; Q13606
11277	OR5J2	HGNC:19612; Q8NH18
11278	OR5K1	HGNC:8349; Q8NHB7
11279	OR5K2	HGNC:14774; Q8NHB8
11280	OR5K3	HGNC:31290; A6NET4
11281	OR5K4	HGNC:31291; A6NMS3
11282	OR5L1	HGNC:8350; Q8NGL2
11283	OR5L2	HGNC:8351; Q8NGL0
11284	OR5M1	HGNC:8352; Q8NGP8
11285	OR5M3	HGNC:14806; Q8NGP4
11286	OR5M8	HGNC:14846; Q8NGP6
11287	OR5M9	HGNC:15294; Q8NGP3
11288	OR5M10	HGNC:15290; Q6IEU7
11289	OR5M11	HGNC:15291; Q96RB7
11290	OR5P2	HGNC:14783; Q8WZ92
11291	OR5P3	HGNC:14784; Q8WZ94
11292	OR5T1	HGNC:14821; Q8NG75
11293	OR5T2	HGNC:15296; Q8NGG2
11294	OR5T3	HGNC:15297; Q8NGG3
11295	OR5V1	HGNC:13972; Q9UGF6
11296	OR5W2	HGNC:15299; Q8NH69
11297	OR6A2	HGNC:15301; O95222
11298	OR6B1	HGNC:8354; O95007
11299	OR6B2	HGNC:15041; Q6IFH4
11300	OR6B3	HGNC:15042; Q8NGW1
11301	OR6C1	HGNC:8355; Q96RD1
11302	OR6C2	HGNC:15436; Q9NZP2
11303	OR6C3	HGNC:15437; Q9NZP0
11304	OR6C4	HGNC:19632; Q8NGE1
11305	OR6C6	HGNC:31293; A6NF89
11306	OR6C65	HGNC:31295; A6NJZ3
11307	OR6C68	HGNC:31297; A6NDL8
11308	OR6C70	HGNC:31299; A6NIJ9
11309	OR6C74	HGNC:31303; A6NCV1
11310	OR6C75	HGNC:31304; A6NL08
11311	OR6C76	HGNC:31305; A6NM76
11312	OR6F1	HGNC:15027; Q8NGZ6
11313	OR6J1	HGNC:14707; Q8NGC5
11314	OR6K2	HGNC:15029; Q8NGY2
11315	OR6K3	HGNC:15030; Q8NGY3
11316	OR6K6	HGNC:15033; Q8NGW6
11317	OR6M1	HGNC:14711; Q8NGM8
11318	OR6N1	HGNC:15034; Q8NGY5
11319	OR6N2	HGNC:15035; Q8NGY6
11320	OR6P1	HGNC:15036; Q8NGX9
11321	OR6Q1	HGNC:15302; Q8NGQ2
11322	OR6S1	HGNC:15363; Q8NH40
11323	OR6T1	HGNC:14848; Q8NGN1
11324	OR6V1	HGNC:15090; Q8N148
11325	OR6X1	HGNC:14737; Q8NH79
11326	OR6Y1	HGNC:14823; Q8NGX8
11327	OR7A5	HGNC:8368; Q15622
11328	OR7A10	HGNC:8356; O76100
11329	OR7A17	HGNC:8363; O14581
11330	OR7C1	HGNC:8373; O76099
11331	OR7C2	HGNC:8374; O60412
11332	OR7D2	HGNC:8378; Q96RA2
11333	OR7D4	HGNC:8380; Q8NG98
11334	OR7E24	HGNC:8396; Q6IFN5
11335	OR7G1	HGNC:8465; Q8NGA0
11336	OR7G2	HGNC:8466; Q8NG99
11337	OR7G3	HGNC:8467; Q8NG95
11338	OR8A1	HGNC:8469; Q8NGG7
11339	OR8B2	HGNC:8471; Q96RD0
11340	OR8B3	HGNC:8472; Q8NGG8
11341	OR8B4	HGNC:8473; Q96RC9
11342	OR8B8	HGNC:8477; Q15620
11343	OR8B12	HGNC:15307; Q8NGG6
11344	OR8D1	HGNC:8481; Q8WZ84
11345	OR8D2	HGNC:8482; Q9GZM6
11346	OR8D4	HGNC:14840; Q8NGM9
11347	OR8G1	HGNC:8484; Q15617
11348	OR8G3	HGNC:14698; P0DMU2
11349	OR8G5	HGNC:19622; Q8NG78
11350	OR8H1	HGNC:14824; Q8NGG4
11351	OR8H2	HGNC:15308; Q8N162
11352	OR8H3	HGNC:15309; Q8N146
11353	OR8I2	HGNC:15310; Q8N0Y5
11354	OR8J1	HGNC:14855; Q8NGP2
11355	OR8J2	HGNC:15311; Q8NGG1
11356	OR8J3	HGNC:15312; Q8NGG0
11357	OR8K1	HGNC:14831; Q8NGG5
11358	OR8K3	HGNC:15313; Q8NH51
11359	OR8K5	HGNC:15315; Q8NH50
11360	OR8S1	HGNC:19628; Q8NH09
11361	OR8U1	HGNC:19611; Q8NH10
11362	OR8U3	HGNC:14841; Q8NH85
11363	OR9A2	HGNC:15093; Q8NGT5
11364	OR9A4	HGNC:15095; Q8NGU2
11365	OR9G1	HGNC:15319; Q8NH87
11366	OR9G4	HGNC:15322; Q8NGQ1
11367	OR9H1	HGNC:15038; Q6UXT6
11368	OR9I1	HGNC:14718; Q8NGQ6
11369	OR9K2	HGNC:15339; Q8NGE7
11370	OR9Q1	HGNC:14724; Q8NGQ5
11371	OR9Q2	HGNC:15328; Q8NGE9
11372	OR10A2	HGNC:8161; Q9H208
11373	OR10A3	HGNC:8162; P58181
11374	OR10A4	HGNC:15130; Q9H209
11375	OR10A5	HGNC:15131; Q9H207
11376	OR10A6	HGNC:15132; Q8NH74
11377	OR10A7	HGNC:15329; Q8NGE5
11378	OR10AC1	HGNC:14758; Q8NH08
11379	OR10AD1	HGNC:14819; Q8NGE0
11380	OR10AG1	HGNC:19607; Q8NH19
11381	OR10C1	HGNC:8165; Q96KK4
11382	OR10D3	HGNC:8168; Q8NH80
11383	OR10G2	HGNC:8170; Q8NGC3
11384	OR10G3	HGNC:8171; Q8NGC4
11385	OR10G4	HGNC:14809; Q8NGN3
11386	OR10G6	HGNC:14836; Q8NH81
11387	OR10G7	HGNC:14842; Q8NGN6
11388	OR10G8	HGNC:14845; Q8NGN5
11389	OR10G9	HGNC:15129; Q8NGN4
11390	OR10H1	HGNC:8172; Q9Y4A9
11391	OR10H2	HGNC:8173; O60403
11392	OR10H3	HGNC:8174; O60404
11393	OR10H4	HGNC:15388; Q8NGA5
11394	OR10H5	HGNC:15389; Q8NGA6
11395	OR10J1	HGNC:8175; P30954
11396	OR10J3	HGNC:14992; Q5JRS4
11397	OR10J4	HGNC:15408; P0C629
11398	OR10J5	HGNC:14993; Q8NHC4
11399	OR10K1	HGNC:14693; Q8NGX5
11400	OR10K2	HGNC:14826; Q6IF99
11401	OR10P1	HGNC:15378; Q8NGE3
11402	OR10Q1	HGNC:15134; Q8NGQ4
11403	OR10R2	HGNC:14820; Q8NGX6
11404	OR10S1	HGNC:14807; Q8NGN2
11405	OR10T2	HGNC:14816; Q8NGX3
11406	OR10V1	HGNC:15136; Q8NGI7
11407	OR10W1	HGNC:15139; Q8NGF6
11408	OR10X1	HGNC:14995; Q8NGY0
11409	OR10Z1	HGNC:14996; Q8NGY1
11410	OR11A1	HGNC:8176; Q9GZK7
11411	OR11G2	HGNC:15346; Q8NGC1
11412	OR11H1	HGNC:15404; Q8NG94
11413	OR11H2	HGNC:14716; Q8NH07
11414	OR11H4	HGNC:15347; Q8NGC9
11415	OR11H6	HGNC:15349; Q8NGC7
11416	OR11H7	HGNC:15350; Q8NGC8
11417	OR11H12	HGNC:30738; B2RN74
11418	OR11L1	HGNC:14998; Q8NGX0
11419	OR12D1	HGNC:8177; P0DN82
11420	OR12D2	HGNC:8178; P58182
11421	OR12D3	HGNC:13963; Q9UGF7
11422	OR13A1	HGNC:14772; Q8NGR1
11423	OR13C2	HGNC:14701; Q8NGS9
11424	OR13C3	HGNC:14704; Q8NGS6
11425	OR13C4	HGNC:14722; Q8NGS5
11426	OR13C5	HGNC:15100; Q8NGS8
11427	OR13C7	HGNC:15102; P0DN81
11428	OR13C8	HGNC:15103; Q8NGS7
11429	OR13C9	HGNC:15104; Q8NGT0
11430	OR13D1	HGNC:14695; Q8NGV5
11431	OR13F1	HGNC:14723; Q8NGS4
11432	OR13G1	HGNC:14999; Q8NGZ3
11433	OR13H1	HGNC:14755; Q8NG92
11434	OR13J1	HGNC:15108; Q8NGT2
11435	OR14A2	HGNC:15024; Q96R54
11436	OR14A16	HGNC:15022; Q8NHC5
11437	OR14C36	HGNC:15026; Q8NHC7
11438	OR14I1	HGNC:19575; A6ND48
11439	OR14J1	HGNC:13971; Q9UGF5
11440	OR14K1	HGNC:15025; Q8NGZ2
11441	OR14L1	HGNC:15023; Q8NHC6
11442	OR51A2	HGNC:14764; Q8NGJ7
11443	OR51A4	HGNC:14795; Q8NGJ6
11444	OR51A7	HGNC:15188; Q8NH64
11445	OR51B2	HGNC:14703; Q9Y5P1
11446	OR51B4	HGNC:14708; Q9Y5P0
11447	OR51B5	HGNC:19599; Q9H339
11448	OR51B6	HGNC:19600; Q9H340
11449	OR51C1	HGNC:15191; A0A3B3IT45
11450	OR51D1	HGNC:15193; Q8NGF3
11451	OR51E1	HGNC:15194; Q8TCB6
11452	OR51E2	HGNC:15195; Q9H255
11453	OR51F1	HGNC:15196; A6NGY5
11454	OR51F2	HGNC:15197; Q8NH61
11455	OR51G1	HGNC:14738; Q8NGK1
11456	OR51G2	HGNC:15198; Q8NGK0
11457	OR51H1	HGNC:14833; Q8NH63
11458	OR51I1	HGNC:15200; Q9H343
11459	OR51I2	HGNC:15201; Q9H344
11460	OR51J1	HGNC:14856; Q9H342
11461	OR51L1	HGNC:14759; Q8NGJ5
11462	OR51M1	HGNC:14847; Q9H341
11463	OR51Q1	HGNC:14851; Q8NH59
11464	OR51S1	HGNC:15204; Q8NGJ8
11465	OR51T1	HGNC:15205; Q8NGJ9
11466	OR51V1	HGNC:19597; Q9H2C8
11467	OR52A1	HGNC:8318; Q9UKL2
11468	OR52A5	HGNC:19580; Q9H2C5
11469	OR52B2	HGNC:15207; Q96RD2
11470	OR52B4	HGNC:15209; Q8NGK2
11471	OR52B6	HGNC:15211; Q8NGF0
11472	OR52D1	HGNC:15212; Q9H346
11473	OR52E1	HGNC:14766; Q8NGJ3
11474	OR52E2	HGNC:14769; Q8NGJ4
11475	OR52E4	HGNC:15213; Q8NGH9
11476	OR52E5	HGNC:15214; Q8NH55
11477	OR52E6	HGNC:15215; Q96RD3
11478	OR52E8	HGNC:15217; Q6IFG1
11479	OR52H1	HGNC:15218; Q8NGJ2
11480	OR52I1	HGNC:15220; Q8NGK6
11481	OR52I2	HGNC:15221; Q8NH67
11482	OR52J3	HGNC:14799; Q8NH60
11483	OR52K1	HGNC:15222; Q8NGK4
11484	OR52K2	HGNC:15223; Q8NGK3
11485	OR52L1	HGNC:14785; Q8NGH7
11486	OR52M1	HGNC:15225; Q8NGK5
11487	OR52N1	HGNC:14853; Q8NH53
11488	OR52N2	HGNC:15228; Q8NGI0
11489	OR52N4	HGNC:15230; Q8NGI2
11490	OR52N5	HGNC:15231; Q8NH56
11491	OR52P1	HGNC:15232; Q8NH57
11492	OR52R1	HGNC:15235; Q8NGF1
11493	OR52W1	HGNC:15239; Q6IF63
11494	OR56A1	HGNC:14781; Q8NGH5
11495	OR56A3	HGNC:14786; Q8NH54
11496	OR56A4	HGNC:14791; Q8NGH8
11497	OR56A5	HGNC:14792; P0C7T3
11498	OR56B1	HGNC:15245; Q8NGI3
11499	OR56B2	HGNC:15246; Q8NGI1
11500	OR56B4	HGNC:15248; Q8NH76
11501	ORAI1	HGNC:25896; Q96D31
11502	ORAI2	HGNC:21667; Q96SN7
11503	ORAI3	HGNC:28185; Q9BRQ5
11504	ORC1	HGNC:8487; Q13415
11505	ORC2	HGNC:8488; Q13416
11506	ORC3	HGNC:8489; Q9UBD5
11507	ORC4	HGNC:8490; O43929
11508	ORC5	HGNC:8491; O43913
11509	ORC6	HGNC:17151; Q9Y5N6
11510	ORM1	HGNC:8498; P02763
11511	ORM2	HGNC:8499; P19652
11512	ORMDL1	HGNC:16036; Q9P0S3
11513	ORMDL2	HGNC:16037; Q53FV1
11514	ORMDL3	HGNC:16038; Q8N138
11515	OS9	HGNC:16994; Q13438
11516	OSBP	HGNC:8503; P22059
11517	OSBP2	HGNC:8504; Q969R2
11518	OSBPL1A	HGNC:16398; Q9BXW6
11519	OSBPL2	HGNC:15761; Q9H1P3
11520	OSBPL3	HGNC:16370; Q9H4L5
11521	OSBPL5	HGNC:16392; Q9H0X9
11522	OSBPL6	HGNC:16388; Q9BZF3
11523	OSBPL7	HGNC:16387; Q9BZF2
11524	OSBPL8	HGNC:16396; Q9BZF1
11525	OSBPL9	HGNC:16386; Q96SU4
11526	OSBPL10	HGNC:16395; Q9BXB5
11527	OSBPL11	HGNC:16397; Q9BXB4
11528	OSCAR	HGNC:29960; Q8IYS5
11529	OSCP1	HGNC:29971; Q8WVF1
11530	OSER1	HGNC:16105; Q9NX31
11531	OSGEP	HGNC:18028; Q9NPF4
11532	OSGEPL1	HGNC:23075; Q9H4B0
11533	OSGIN1	HGNC:30093; Q9UJX0
11534	OSGIN2	HGNC:1355; Q9Y236
11535	OSM	HGNC:8506; P13725
11536	OSMR	HGNC:8507; Q99650
11537	OSR1	HGNC:8111; Q8TAX0
11538	OSR2	HGNC:15830; Q8N2R0
11539	OST4	HGNC:32483; P0C6T2
11540	OSTC	HGNC:24448; Q9NRP0
11541	OSTF1	HGNC:8510; Q92882
11542	OSTM1	HGNC:21652; Q86WC4
11543	OSTN	HGNC:29961; P61366
11544	OTC	HGNC:8512; P00480
11545	OTOA	HGNC:16378; Q7RTW8
11546	OTOF	HGNC:8515; Q9HC10
11547	OTOG	HGNC:8516; Q6ZRI0
11548	OTOGL	HGNC:26901; Q3ZCN5
11549	OTOL1	HGNC:34071; A6NHN0
11550	OTOP1	HGNC:19656; Q7RTM1
11551	OTOP2	HGNC:19657; Q7RTS6
11552	OTOP3	HGNC:19658; Q7RTS5
11553	OTOR	HGNC:8517; Q9NRC9
11554	OTOS	HGNC:22644; Q8NHW6
11555	OTP	HGNC:8518; Q5XKR4
11556	OTUB1	HGNC:23077; Q96FW1
11557	OTUB2	HGNC:20351; Q96DC9
11558	OTUD1	HGNC:27346; Q5VV17
11559	OTUD3	HGNC:29038; Q5T2D3
11560	OTUD4	HGNC:24949; Q01804
11561	OTUD5	HGNC:25402; Q96G74
11562	OTUD6A	HGNC:32312; Q7L8S5
11563	OTUD6B	HGNC:24281; Q8N6M0
11564	OTUD7A	HGNC:20718; Q8TE49
11565	OTUD7B	HGNC:16683; Q6GQQ9
11566	OTULIN	HGNC:25118; Q96BN8
11567	OTULINL	HGNC:25629; Q9NUU6
11568	OTX1	HGNC:8521; P32242
11569	OTX2	HGNC:8522; P32243
11570	OVCA2	HGNC:24203; Q8WZ82
11571	OVCH1	HGNC:23080; Q7RTY7
11572	OVCH2	HGNC:29970; Q7RTZ1
11573	OVGP1	HGNC:8524; Q12889
11574	OVOL1	HGNC:8525; O14753
11575	OVOL2	HGNC:15804; Q9BRP0
11576	OVOL3	HGNC:14186; O00110
11577	OXA1L	HGNC:8526; Q15070
11578	OXCT1	HGNC:8527; P55809
11579	OXCT2	HGNC:18606; Q9BYC2
11580	OXER1	HGNC:24884; Q8TDS5
11581	OXGR1	HGNC:4531; Q96P68
11582	OXLD1	HGNC:27901; Q5BKU9
11583	OXNAD1	HGNC:25128; Q96HP4
11584	OXR1	HGNC:15822; Q8N573
11585	OXSM	HGNC:26063; Q9NWU1
11586	OXSR1	HGNC:8508; O95747
11587	OXT	HGNC:8528; P01178
11588	OXTR	HGNC:8529; P30559
11589	P2RX1	HGNC:8533; P51575
11590	P2RX2	HGNC:15459; Q9UBL9
11591	P2RX3	HGNC:8534; P56373
11592	P2RX4	HGNC:8535; Q99571
11593	P2RX5	HGNC:8536; Q93086
11594	P2RX6	HGNC:8538; O15547
11595	P2RX7	HGNC:8537; Q99572
11596	P2RY1	HGNC:8539; P47900
11597	P2RY2	HGNC:8541; P41231
11598	P2RY4	HGNC:8542; P51582
11599	P2RY6	HGNC:8543; Q15077
11600	P2RY8	HGNC:15524; Q86VZ1
11601	P2RY10	HGNC:19906; O00398
11602	P2RY11	HGNC:8540; Q96G91
11603	P2RY12	HGNC:18124; Q9H244
11604	P2RY13	HGNC:4537; Q9BPV8
11605	P2RY14	HGNC:16442; Q15391
11606	P3H1	HGNC:19316; Q32P28
11607	P3H2	HGNC:19317; Q8IVL5
11608	P3H3	HGNC:19318; Q8IVL6
11609	P3H4	HGNC:16946; Q92791
11610	P3R3URF	HGNC:53451; A0A087WWA1
11611	P4HA1	HGNC:8546; P13674
11612	P4HA2	HGNC:8547; O15460
11613	P4HA3	HGNC:30135; Q7Z4N8
11614	P4HB	HGNC:8548; P07237
11615	P4HTM	HGNC:28858; Q9NXG6
11616	PA2G4	HGNC:8550; Q9UQ80
11617	PAAF1	HGNC:25687; Q9BRP4
11618	PABIR1	HGNC:23490; Q96E09
11619	PABIR2	HGNC:30490; Q7Z309
11620	PABIR3	HGNC:25202; Q6P4D5
11621	PABPC1	HGNC:8554; P11940
11622	PABPC1L	HGNC:15797; Q4VXU2
11623	PABPC1L2A	HGNC:27989; Q5JQF8
11624	PABPC1L2B	HGNC:31852; Q5JQF8
11625	PABPC3	HGNC:8556; Q9H361
11626	PABPC4	HGNC:8557; Q13310
11627	PABPC4L	HGNC:31955; P0CB38
11628	PABPC5	HGNC:13629; Q96DU9
11629	PABPN1	HGNC:8565; Q86U42
11630	PABPN1L	HGNC:37237; A6NDY0
11631	PACC1	HGNC:25593; Q9H813
11632	PACRG	HGNC:19152; Q96M98
11633	PACRGL	HGNC:28442; Q8N7B6
11634	PACS1	HGNC:30032; Q6VY07
11635	PACS2	HGNC:23794; Q86VP3
11636	PACSIN1	HGNC:8570; Q9BY11
11637	PACSIN2	HGNC:8571; Q9UNF0
11638	PACSIN3	HGNC:8572; Q9UKS6
11639	PADI1	HGNC:18367; Q9ULC6
11640	PADI2	HGNC:18341; Q9Y2J8
11641	PADI3	HGNC:18337; Q9ULW8
11642	PADI4	HGNC:18368; Q9UM07
11643	PADI6	HGNC:20449; Q6TGC4
11644	PAEP	HGNC:8573; P09466
11645	PAF1	HGNC:25459; Q8N7H5
11646	PAFAH1B1	HGNC:8574; P43034
11647	PAFAH1B2	HGNC:8575; P68402
11648	PAFAH1B3	HGNC:8576; Q15102
11649	PAFAH2	HGNC:8579; Q99487
11650	PAG1	HGNC:30043; Q9NWQ8
11651	PAGE1	HGNC:4107; O75459
11652	PAGE2	HGNC:31804; Q7Z2X7
11653	PAGE2B	HGNC:31805; Q5JRK9
11654	PAGE3	HGNC:4110; Q5JUK9
11655	PAGE4	HGNC:4108; O60829
11656	PAGE5	HGNC:29992; Q96GU1
11657	PAGR1	HGNC:28707; Q9BTK6
11658	PAH	HGNC:8582; P00439
11659	PAICS	HGNC:8587; P22234
11660	PAIP1	HGNC:16945; Q9H074
11661	PAIP2	HGNC:17970; Q9BPZ3
11662	PAIP2B	HGNC:29200; Q9ULR5
11663	PAK1	HGNC:8590; Q13153
11664	PAK1IP1	HGNC:20882; Q9NWT1
11665	PAK2	HGNC:8591; Q13177
11666	PAK3	HGNC:8592; O75914
11667	PAK4	HGNC:16059; O96013
11668	PAK5	HGNC:15916; Q9P286
11669	PAK6	HGNC:16061; Q9NQU5
11670	PALB2	HGNC:26144; Q86YC2
11671	PALD1	HGNC:23530; Q9ULE6
11672	PALLD	HGNC:17068; Q8WX93
11673	PALM	HGNC:8594; O75781
11674	PALM2AKAP2	HGNC:33529; Q9Y2D5
11675	PALM3	HGNC:33274; A6NDB9
11676	PALMD	HGNC:15846; Q9NP74
11677	PALS1	HGNC:18669; Q8N3R9
11678	PALS2	HGNC:18167; Q9NZW5
11679	PAM	HGNC:8596; P19021
11680	PAM16	HGNC:29679; Q9Y3D7
11681	PAMR1	HGNC:24554; Q6UXH9
11682	PAN2	HGNC:20074; Q504Q3
11683	PAN3	HGNC:29991; Q58A45
11684	PANK1	HGNC:8598; Q8TE04
11685	PANK2	HGNC:15894; Q9BZ23
11686	PANK3	HGNC:19365; Q9H999
11687	PANK4	HGNC:19366; Q9NVE7
11688	PANO1	HGNC:51237; I0J062
11689	PANX1	HGNC:8599; Q96RD7
11690	PANX2	HGNC:8600; Q96RD6
11691	PANX3	HGNC:20573; Q96QZ0
11692	PAOX	HGNC:20837; Q6QHF9
11693	PAPLN	HGNC:19262; O95428
11694	PAPOLA	HGNC:14981; P51003
11695	PAPOLB	HGNC:15970; Q9NRJ5
11696	PAPOLG	HGNC:14982; Q9BWT3
11697	PAPPA	HGNC:8602; Q13219
11698	PAPPA2	HGNC:14615; Q9BXP8
11699	PAPSS1	HGNC:8603; O43252
11700	PAPSS2	HGNC:8604; O95340
11701	PAQR3	HGNC:30130; Q6TCH7
11702	PAQR4	HGNC:26386; Q8N4S7
11703	PAQR5	HGNC:29645; Q9NXK6
11704	PAQR6	HGNC:30132; Q6TCH4
11705	PAQR7	HGNC:23146; Q86WK9
11706	PAQR8	HGNC:15708; Q8TEZ7
11707	PAQR9	HGNC:30131; Q6ZVX9
11708	PARD3	HGNC:16051; Q8TEW0
11709	PARD3B	HGNC:14446; Q8TEW8
11710	PARD6A	HGNC:15943; Q9NPB6
11711	PARD6B	HGNC:16245; Q9BYG5
11712	PARD6G	HGNC:16076; Q9BYG4
11713	PARG	HGNC:8605; Q86W56
11714	PARK7	HGNC:16369; Q99497
11715	PARL	HGNC:18253; Q9H300
11716	PARM1	HGNC:24536; Q6UWI2
11717	PARN	HGNC:8609; O95453
11718	PARP1	HGNC:270; P09874
11719	PARP2	HGNC:272; Q9UGN5
11720	PARP3	HGNC:273; Q9Y6F1
11721	PARP4	HGNC:271; Q9UKK3
11722	PARP6	HGNC:26921; Q2NL67
11723	PARP8	HGNC:26124; Q8N3A8
11724	PARP9	HGNC:24118; Q8IXQ6
11725	PARP10	HGNC:25895; Q53GL7
11726	PARP11	HGNC:1186; Q9NR21
11727	PARP12	HGNC:21919; Q9H0J9
11728	PARP14	HGNC:29232; Q460N5
11729	PARP15	HGNC:26876; Q460N3
11730	PARP16	HGNC:26040; Q8N5Y8
11731	PARPBP	HGNC:26074; Q9NWS1
11732	PARS2	HGNC:30563; Q7L3T8
11733	PARVA	HGNC:14652; Q9NVD7
11734	PARVB	HGNC:14653; Q9HBI1
11735	PARVG	HGNC:14654; Q9HBI0
11736	PASD1	HGNC:20686; Q8IV76
11737	PASK	HGNC:17270; Q96RG2
11738	PATE1	HGNC:24664; Q8WXA2
11739	PATE2	HGNC:32249; Q6UY27
11740	PATE3	HGNC:35426; B3GLJ2
11741	PATE4	HGNC:35427; P0C8F1
11742	PATJ	HGNC:28881; Q8NI35
11743	PATL1	HGNC:26721; Q86TB9
11744	PATL2	HGNC:33630; C9JE40
11745	PATZ1	HGNC:13071; Q9HBE1
11746	PAWR	HGNC:8614; Q96IZ0
11747	PAX1	HGNC:8615; P15863
11748	PAX2	HGNC:8616; Q02962
11749	PAX3	HGNC:8617; P23760
11750	PAX4	HGNC:8618; O43316
11751	PAX5	HGNC:8619; Q02548
11752	PAX6	HGNC:8620; P26367
11753	PAX7	HGNC:8621; P23759
11754	PAX8	HGNC:8622; Q06710
11755	PAX9	HGNC:8623; P55771
11756	PAXBP1	HGNC:13579; Q9Y5B6
11757	PAXIP1	HGNC:8624; Q6ZW49
11758	PAXX	HGNC:27849; Q9BUH6
11759	PBDC1	HGNC:28790; Q9BVG4
11760	PBK	HGNC:18282; Q96KB5
11761	PBLD	HGNC:23301; P30039
11762	PBOV1	HGNC:21079; Q9GZY1
11763	PBRM1	HGNC:30064; Q86U86
11764	PBX1	HGNC:8632; P40424
11765	PBX2	HGNC:8633; P40425
11766	PBX3	HGNC:8634; P40426
11767	PBX4	HGNC:13403; Q9BYU1
11768	PBXIP1	HGNC:21199; Q96AQ6
11769	PC	HGNC:8636; P11498
11770	PCARE	HGNC:34383; A6NGG8
11771	PCBD1	HGNC:8646; P61457
11772	PCBD2	HGNC:24474; Q9H0N5
11773	PCBP1	HGNC:8647; Q15365
11774	PCBP2	HGNC:8648; Q15366
11775	PCBP3	HGNC:8651; P57721
11776	PCBP4	HGNC:8652; P57723
11777	PCCA	HGNC:8653; P05165
11778	PCCB	HGNC:8654; P05166
11779	PCDH1	HGNC:8655; Q08174
11780	PCDH7	HGNC:8659; O60245
11781	PCDH8	HGNC:8660; O95206
11782	PCDH9	HGNC:8661; Q9HC56
11783	PCDH10	HGNC:13404; Q9P2E7
11784	PCDH11X	HGNC:8656; Q9BZA7
11785	PCDH11Y	HGNC:15813; Q9BZA8
11786	PCDH12	HGNC:8657; Q9NPG4
11787	PCDH15	HGNC:14674; Q96QU1
11788	PCDH17	HGNC:14267; O14917
11789	PCDH18	HGNC:14268; Q9HCL0
11790	PCDH19	HGNC:14270; Q8TAB3
11791	PCDH20	HGNC:14257; Q8N6Y1
11792	PCDHA@	HGNC:8662
11793	PCDHB@	HGNC:8679
11794	PCDHG@	HGNC:8695
11795	PCED1A	HGNC:16212; Q9H1Q7
11796	PCED1B	HGNC:28255; Q96HM7
11797	PCF11	HGNC:30097; O94913
11798	PCGF1	HGNC:17615; Q9BSM1
11799	PCGF2	HGNC:12929; P35227
11800	PCGF3	HGNC:10066; Q3KNV8
11801	PCGF5	HGNC:28264; Q86SE9
11802	PCGF6	HGNC:21156; Q9BYE7
11803	PCID2	HGNC:25653; Q5JVF3
11804	PCIF1	HGNC:16200; Q9H4Z3
11805	PCK1	HGNC:8724; P35558
11806	PCK2	HGNC:8725; Q16822
11807	PCLAF	HGNC:28961; Q15004
11808	PCLO	HGNC:13406; Q9Y6V0
11809	PCM1	HGNC:8727; Q15154
11810	PCMT1	HGNC:8728; P22061
11811	PCMTD1	HGNC:30483; Q96MG8
11812	PCMTD2	HGNC:15882; Q9NV79
11813	PCNA	HGNC:8729; P12004
11814	PCNP	HGNC:30023; Q8WW12
11815	PCNT	HGNC:16068; O95613
11816	PCNX1	HGNC:19740; Q96RV3
11817	PCNX2	HGNC:8736; A6NKB5
11818	PCNX3	HGNC:18760; Q9H6A9
11819	PCNX4	HGNC:20349; Q63HM2
11820	PCOLCE	HGNC:8738; Q15113
11821	PCOLCE2	HGNC:8739; Q9UKZ9
11822	PCP2	HGNC:30209; Q8IVA1
11823	PCP4	HGNC:8742; P48539
11824	PCP4L1	HGNC:20448; A6NKN8
11825	PCSK1	HGNC:8743; P29120
11826	PCSK1N	HGNC:17301; Q9UHG2
11827	PCSK2	HGNC:8744; P16519
11828	PCSK4	HGNC:8746; Q6UW60
11829	PCSK5	HGNC:8747; Q92824
11830	PCSK6	HGNC:8569; P29122
11831	PCSK7	HGNC:8748; Q16549
11832	PCSK9	HGNC:20001; Q8NBP7
11833	PCTP	HGNC:8752; Q9UKL6
11834	PCYOX1	HGNC:20588; Q9UHG3
11835	PCYOX1L	HGNC:28477; Q8NBM8
11836	PCYT1A	HGNC:8754; P49585
11837	PCYT1B	HGNC:8755; Q9Y5K3
11838	PCYT2	HGNC:8756; Q99447
11839	PDAP1	HGNC:14634; Q13442
11840	PDC	HGNC:8759; P20941
11841	PDCD1	HGNC:8760; Q15116
11842	PDCD1LG2	HGNC:18731; Q9BQ51
11843	PDCD2	HGNC:8762; Q16342
11844	PDCD2L	HGNC:28194; Q9BRP1
11845	PDCD4	HGNC:8763; Q53EL6
11846	PDCD5	HGNC:8764; O14737
11847	PDCD6	HGNC:8765; O75340
11848	PDCD6IP	HGNC:8766; Q8WUM4
11849	PDCD7	HGNC:8767; Q8N8D1
11850	PDCD10	HGNC:8761; Q9BUL8
11851	PDCD11	HGNC:13408; Q14690
11852	PDCL	HGNC:8770; Q13371
11853	PDCL2	HGNC:29524; Q8N4E4
11854	PDCL3	HGNC:28860; Q9H2J4
11855	PDE1A	HGNC:8774; P54750
11856	PDE1B	HGNC:8775; Q01064
11857	PDE1C	HGNC:8776; Q14123
11858	PDE2A	HGNC:8777; O00408
11859	PDE3A	HGNC:8778; Q14432
11860	PDE3B	HGNC:8779; Q13370
11861	PDE4A	HGNC:8780; P27815
11862	PDE4B	HGNC:8781; Q07343
11863	PDE4C	HGNC:8782; Q08493
11864	PDE4D	HGNC:8783; Q08499
11865	PDE4DIP	HGNC:15580; Q5VU43
11866	PDE5A	HGNC:8784; O76074
11867	PDE6A	HGNC:8785; P16499
11868	PDE6B	HGNC:8786; P35913
11869	PDE6C	HGNC:8787; P51160
11870	PDE6D	HGNC:8788; O43924
11871	PDE6G	HGNC:8789; P18545
11872	PDE6H	HGNC:8790; Q13956
11873	PDE7A	HGNC:8791; Q13946
11874	PDE7B	HGNC:8792; Q9NP56
11875	PDE8A	HGNC:8793; O60658
11876	PDE8B	HGNC:8794; O95263
11877	PDE9A	HGNC:8795; O76083
11878	PDE10A	HGNC:8772; Q9Y233
11879	PDE11A	HGNC:8773; Q9HCR9
11880	PDE12	HGNC:25386; Q6L8Q7
11881	PDF	HGNC:30012; Q9HBH1
11882	PDGFA	HGNC:8799; P04085
11883	PDGFB	HGNC:8800; P01127
11884	PDGFC	HGNC:8801; Q9NRA1
11885	PDGFD	HGNC:30620; Q9GZP0
11886	PDGFRA	HGNC:8803; P16234
11887	PDGFRB	HGNC:8804; P09619
11888	PDGFRL	HGNC:8805; Q15198
11889	PDHA1	HGNC:8806; P08559
11890	PDHA2	HGNC:8807; P29803
11891	PDHB	HGNC:8808; P11177
11892	PDHX	HGNC:21350; O00330
11893	PDIA2	HGNC:14180; Q13087
11894	PDIA3	HGNC:4606; P30101
11895	PDIA4	HGNC:30167; P13667
11896	PDIA5	HGNC:24811; Q14554
11897	PDIA6	HGNC:30168; Q15084
11898	PDIK1L	HGNC:18981; Q8N165
11899	PDILT	HGNC:27338; Q8N807
11900	PDK1	HGNC:8809; Q15118
11901	PDK2	HGNC:8810; Q15119
11902	PDK3	HGNC:8811; Q15120
11903	PDK4	HGNC:8812; Q16654
11904	PDLIM1	HGNC:2067; O00151
11905	PDLIM2	HGNC:13992; Q96JY6
11906	PDLIM3	HGNC:20767; Q53GG5
11907	PDLIM4	HGNC:16501; P50479
11908	PDLIM5	HGNC:17468; Q96HC4
11909	PDLIM7	HGNC:22958; Q9NR12
11910	PDP1	HGNC:9279; Q9P0J1
11911	PDP2	HGNC:30263; Q9P2J9
11912	PDPK1	HGNC:8816; O15530
11913	PDPN	HGNC:29602; Q86YL7
11914	PDPR	HGNC:30264; Q8NCN5
11915	PDRG1	HGNC:16119; Q9NUG6
11916	PDS5A	HGNC:29088; Q29RF7
11917	PDS5B	HGNC:20418; Q9NTI5
11918	PDSS1	HGNC:17759; Q5T2R2
11919	PDSS2	HGNC:23041; Q86YH6
11920	PDX1	HGNC:6107; P52945
11921	PDXDC1	HGNC:28995; Q6P996
11922	PDXK	HGNC:8819; O00764
11923	PDXP	HGNC:30259; Q96GD0
11924	PDYN	HGNC:8820; P01213
11925	PDZD2	HGNC:18486; O15018
11926	PDZD4	HGNC:21167; Q76G19
11927	PDZD7	HGNC:26257; Q9H5P4
11928	PDZD8	HGNC:26974; Q8NEN9
11929	PDZD9	HGNC:28740; Q8IXQ8
11930	PDZD11	HGNC:28034; Q5EBL8
11931	PDZK1	HGNC:8821; Q5T2W1
11932	PDZK1IP1	HGNC:16887; Q13113
11933	PDZRN3	HGNC:17704; Q9UPQ7
11934	PDZRN4	HGNC:30552; Q6ZMN7
11935	PEA15	HGNC:8822; Q15121
11936	PEAK1	HGNC:29431; Q9H792
11937	PEAK3	HGNC:24793; Q6ZS72
11938	PEAR1	HGNC:33631; Q5VY43
11939	PEBP1	HGNC:8630; P30086
11940	PEBP4	HGNC:28319; Q96S96
11941	PECAM1	HGNC:8823; P16284
11942	PECR	HGNC:18281; Q9BY49
11943	PEDS1	HGNC:16735; A5PLL7
11944	PEF1	HGNC:30009; Q9UBV8
11945	PEG3	HGNC:8826; Q9GZU2
11946	PEG10	HGNC:14005; Q86TG7
11947	PELI1	HGNC:8827; Q96FA3
11948	PELI2	HGNC:8828; Q9HAT8
11949	PELI3	HGNC:30010; Q8N2H9
11950	PELO	HGNC:8829; Q9BRX2
11951	PELP1	HGNC:30134; Q8IZL8
11952	PEMT	HGNC:8830; Q9UBM1
11953	PENK	HGNC:8831; P01210
11954	PEPD	HGNC:8840; P12955
11955	PER1	HGNC:8845; O15534
11956	PER2	HGNC:8846; O15055
11957	PER3	HGNC:8847; P56645
11958	PERCC1	HGNC:52293; A0A1W2PR82
11959	PERM1	HGNC:28208; Q5SV97
11960	PERP	HGNC:17637; Q96FX8
11961	PES1	HGNC:8848; O00541
11962	PET100	HGNC:40038; P0DJ07
11963	PET117	HGNC:40045; Q6UWS5
11964	PEX1	HGNC:8850; O43933
11965	PEX2	HGNC:9717; P28328
11966	PEX3	HGNC:8858; P56589
11967	PEX5	HGNC:9719; P50542
11968	PEX5L	HGNC:30024; Q8IYB4
11969	PEX6	HGNC:8859; Q13608
11970	PEX7	HGNC:8860; O00628
11971	PEX10	HGNC:8851; O60683
11972	PEX11A	HGNC:8852; O75192
11973	PEX11B	HGNC:8853; O96011
11974	PEX11G	HGNC:20208; Q96HA9
11975	PEX12	HGNC:8854; O00623
11976	PEX13	HGNC:8855; Q92968
11977	PEX14	HGNC:8856; O75381
11978	PEX16	HGNC:8857; Q9Y5Y5
11979	PEX19	HGNC:9713; P40855
11980	PEX26	HGNC:22965; Q7Z412
11981	PEX39	HGNC:34431; Q5I0X4
11982	PF4	HGNC:8861; P02776
11983	PF4V1	HGNC:8862; P10720
11984	PFAS	HGNC:8863; O15067
11985	PFDN1	HGNC:8866; O60925
11986	PFDN2	HGNC:8867; Q9UHV9
11987	PFDN4	HGNC:8868; Q9NQP4
11988	PFDN5	HGNC:8869; Q99471
11989	PFDN6	HGNC:4926; O15212
11990	PFKFB1	HGNC:8872; P16118
11991	PFKFB2	HGNC:8873; O60825
11992	PFKFB3	HGNC:8874; Q16875
11993	PFKFB4	HGNC:8875; Q16877
11994	PFKL	HGNC:8876; P17858
11995	PFKM	HGNC:8877; P08237
11996	PFKP	HGNC:8878; Q01813
11997	PFN1	HGNC:8881; P07737
11998	PFN2	HGNC:8882; P35080
11999	PFN3	HGNC:18627; P60673
12000	PFN4	HGNC:31103; Q8NHR9
12001	PGA3	HGNC:8885; P0DJD8
12002	PGA4	HGNC:8886; P0DJD7
12003	PGA5	HGNC:8887; P0DJD9
12004	PGAM1	HGNC:8888; P18669
12005	PGAM2	HGNC:8889; P15259
12006	PGAM4	HGNC:21731; Q8N0Y7
12007	PGAM5	HGNC:28763; Q96HS1
12008	PGAP1	HGNC:25712; Q75T13
12009	PGAP2	HGNC:17893; Q9UHJ9
12010	PGAP3	HGNC:23719; Q96FM1
12011	PGAP4	HGNC:28180; Q9BRR3
12012	PGAP6	HGNC:17205; Q9HCN3
12013	PGBD1	HGNC:19398; Q96JS3
12014	PGBD2	HGNC:19399; Q6P3X8
12015	PGBD3	HGNC:19400; Q8N328
12016	PGBD4	HGNC:19401; Q96DM1
12017	PGBD5	HGNC:19405; Q8N414
12018	PGC	HGNC:8890; P20142
12019	PGCKA1	HGNC:25618; Q8IY42
12020	PGD	HGNC:8891; P52209
12021	PGF	HGNC:8893; P49763
12022	PGGHG	HGNC:26210; Q32M88
12023	PGGT1B	HGNC:8895; P53609
12024	PGK1	HGNC:8896; P00558
12025	PGK2	HGNC:8898; P07205
12026	PGLS	HGNC:8903; O95336
12027	PGLYRP1	HGNC:8904; O75594
12028	PGLYRP2	HGNC:30013; Q96PD5
12029	PGLYRP3	HGNC:30014; Q96LB9
12030	PGLYRP4	HGNC:30015; Q96LB8
12031	PGM1	HGNC:8905; P36871
12032	PGM2	HGNC:8906; Q96G03
12033	PGM2L1	HGNC:20898; Q6PCE3
12034	PGM3	HGNC:8907; O95394
12035	PGM5	HGNC:8908; Q15124
12036	PGP	HGNC:8909; A6NDG6
12037	PGPEP1	HGNC:13568; Q9NXJ5
12038	PGPEP1L	HGNC:27080; A6NFU8
12039	PGR	HGNC:8910; P06401
12040	PGRMC1	HGNC:16090; O00264
12041	PGRMC2	HGNC:16089; O15173
12042	PGS1	HGNC:30029; Q32NB8
12043	PHACTR1	HGNC:20990; Q9C0D0
12044	PHACTR2	HGNC:20956; O75167
12045	PHACTR3	HGNC:15833; Q96KR7
12046	PHACTR4	HGNC:25793; Q8IZ21
12047	PHAF1	HGNC:29564; Q9BSU1
12048	PHAX	HGNC:10241; Q9H814
12049	PHB1	HGNC:8912; P35232
12050	PHB2	HGNC:30306; Q99623
12051	PHC1	HGNC:3182; P78364
12052	PHC2	HGNC:3183; Q8IXK0
12053	PHC3	HGNC:15682; Q8NDX5
12054	PHETA1	HGNC:26509; Q8N4B1
12055	PHETA2	HGNC:27161; Q6ICB4
12056	PHEX	HGNC:8918; P78562
12057	PHF1	HGNC:8919; O43189
12058	PHF2	HGNC:8920; O75151
12059	PHF3	HGNC:8921; Q92576
12060	PHF5A	HGNC:18000; Q7RTV0
12061	PHF6	HGNC:18145; Q8IWS0
12062	PHF7	HGNC:18458; Q9BWX1
12063	PHF8	HGNC:20672; Q9UPP1
12064	PHF10	HGNC:18250; Q8WUB8
12065	PHF11	HGNC:17024; Q9UIL8
12066	PHF12	HGNC:20816; Q96QT6
12067	PHF13	HGNC:22983; Q86YI8
12068	PHF14	HGNC:22203; O94880
12069	PHF19	HGNC:24566; Q5T6S3
12070	PHF20	HGNC:16098; Q9BVI0
12071	PHF20L1	HGNC:24280; A8MW92
12072	PHF21A	HGNC:24156; Q96BD5
12073	PHF21B	HGNC:25161; Q96EK2
12074	PHF23	HGNC:28428; Q9BUL5
12075	PHF24	HGNC:29180; Q9UPV7
12076	PHGDH	HGNC:8923; O43175
12077	PHGR1	HGNC:37226; C9JFL3
12078	PHIP	HGNC:15673; Q8WWQ0
12079	PHKA1	HGNC:8925; P46020
12080	PHKA2	HGNC:8926; P46019
12081	PHKB	HGNC:8927; Q93100
12082	PHKG1	HGNC:8930; Q16816
12083	PHKG2	HGNC:8931; P15735
12084	PHLDA1	HGNC:8933; Q8WV24
12085	PHLDA2	HGNC:12385; Q53GA4
12086	PHLDA3	HGNC:8934; Q9Y5J5
12087	PHLDB1	HGNC:23697; Q86UU1
12088	PHLDB2	HGNC:29573; Q86SQ0
12089	PHLDB3	HGNC:30499; Q6NSJ2
12090	PHLPP1	HGNC:20610; O60346
12091	PHLPP2	HGNC:29149; Q6ZVD8
12092	PHOSPHO1	HGNC:16815; Q8TCT1
12093	PHOSPHO2	HGNC:28316; Q8TCD6
12094	PHOX2A	HGNC:691; O14813
12095	PHOX2B	HGNC:9143; Q99453
12096	PHPT1	HGNC:30033; Q9NRX4
12097	PHRF1	HGNC:24351; Q9P1Y6
12098	PHTF1	HGNC:8939; Q9UMS5
12099	PHTF2	HGNC:13411; Q8N3S3
12100	PHYH	HGNC:8940; O14832
12101	PHYHD1	HGNC:23396; Q5SRE7
12102	PHYHIP	HGNC:16865; Q92561
12103	PHYHIPL	HGNC:29378; Q96FC7
12104	PHYKPL	HGNC:28249; Q8IUZ5
12105	PI3	HGNC:8947; P19957
12106	PI4K2A	HGNC:30031; Q9BTU6
12107	PI4K2B	HGNC:18215; Q8TCG2
12108	PI4KA	HGNC:8983; P42356
12109	PI4KB	HGNC:8984; Q9UBF8
12110	PI15	HGNC:8946; O43692
12111	PI16	HGNC:21245; Q6UXB8
12112	PIANP	HGNC:25338; Q8IYJ0
12113	PIAS1	HGNC:2752; O75925
12114	PIAS2	HGNC:17311; O75928
12115	PIAS3	HGNC:16861; Q9Y6X2
12116	PIAS4	HGNC:17002; Q8N2W9
12117	PIBF1	HGNC:23352; Q8WXW3
12118	PICALM	HGNC:15514; Q13492
12119	PICK1	HGNC:9394; Q9NRD5
12120	PID1	HGNC:26084; Q7Z2X4
12121	PIDD1	HGNC:16491; C0HMD6, Q9HB75
12122	PIERCE1	HGNC:28435; Q5BN46
12123	PIERCE2	HGNC:44654; H3BRN8
12124	PIEZO1	HGNC:28993; Q92508
12125	PIEZO2	HGNC:26270; Q9H5I5
12126	PIF1	HGNC:26220; Q9H611
12127	PIGA	HGNC:8957; P37287
12128	PIGB	HGNC:8959; Q92521
12129	PIGBOS1	HGNC:50696; A0A0B4J2F0
12130	PIGC	HGNC:8960; Q92535
12131	PIGF	HGNC:8962; Q07326
12132	PIGG	HGNC:25985; Q5H8A4
12133	PIGH	HGNC:8964; Q14442
12134	PIGK	HGNC:8965; Q92643
12135	PIGL	HGNC:8966; Q9Y2B2
12136	PIGM	HGNC:18858; Q9H3S5
12137	PIGN	HGNC:8967; O95427
12138	PIGO	HGNC:23215; Q8TEQ8
12139	PIGP	HGNC:3046; P57054
12140	PIGQ	HGNC:14135; Q9BRB3
12141	PIGR	HGNC:8968; P01833
12142	PIGS	HGNC:14937; Q96S52
12143	PIGT	HGNC:14938; Q969N2
12144	PIGU	HGNC:15791; Q9H490
12145	PIGV	HGNC:26031; Q9NUD9
12146	PIGW	HGNC:23213; Q7Z7B1
12147	PIGX	HGNC:26046; Q8TBF5
12148	PIGY	HGNC:28213; Q3MUY2
12149	PIGZ	HGNC:30596; Q86VD9
12150	PIH1D1	HGNC:26075; Q9NWS0
12151	PIH1D2	HGNC:25210; Q8WWB5
12152	PIK3AP1	HGNC:30034; Q6ZUJ8
12153	PIK3C2A	HGNC:8971; O00443
12154	PIK3C2B	HGNC:8972; O00750
12155	PIK3C2G	HGNC:8973; O75747
12156	PIK3C3	HGNC:8974; Q8NEB9
12157	PIK3CA	HGNC:8975; P42336
12158	PIK3CB	HGNC:8976; P42338
12159	PIK3CD	HGNC:8977; O00329
12160	PIK3CG	HGNC:8978; P48736
12161	PIK3IP1	HGNC:24942; Q96FE7
12162	PIK3R1	HGNC:8979; P27986
12163	PIK3R2	HGNC:8980; O00459
12164	PIK3R3	HGNC:8981; Q92569
12165	PIK3R4	HGNC:8982; Q99570
12166	PIK3R5	HGNC:30035; Q8WYR1
12167	PIK3R6	HGNC:27101; Q5UE93
12168	PIKFYVE	HGNC:23785; Q9Y2I7
12169	PILRA	HGNC:20396; Q9UKJ1
12170	PILRB	HGNC:18297; Q9UKJ0
12171	PIM1	HGNC:8986; P11309
12172	PIM2	HGNC:8987; Q9P1W9
12173	PIM3	HGNC:19310; Q86V86
12174	PIMREG	HGNC:25483; Q9BSJ6
12175	PIN1	HGNC:8988; Q13526
12176	PIN4	HGNC:8992; Q9Y237
12177	PINK1	HGNC:14581; Q9BXM7
12178	PINLYP	HGNC:44206; A6NC86
12179	PINX1	HGNC:30046; Q96BK5
12180	PIP	HGNC:8993; P12273
12181	PIP4K2A	HGNC:8997; P48426
12182	PIP4K2B	HGNC:8998; P78356
12183	PIP4K2C	HGNC:23786; Q8TBX8
12184	PIP4P1	HGNC:19299; Q86T03
12185	PIP4P2	HGNC:25452; Q8N4L2
12186	PIP5K1A	HGNC:8994; Q99755
12187	PIP5K1B	HGNC:8995; O14986
12188	PIP5K1C	HGNC:8996; O60331
12189	PIP5KL1	HGNC:28711; Q5T9C9
12190	PIPOX	HGNC:17804; Q9P0Z9
12191	PIR	HGNC:30048; O00625
12192	PIRT	HGNC:37239; P0C851
12193	PISD	HGNC:8999; Q9UG56
12194	PITHD1	HGNC:25022; Q9GZP4
12195	PITPNA	HGNC:9001; Q00169
12196	PITPNB	HGNC:9002; P48739
12197	PITPNC1	HGNC:21045; Q9UKF7
12198	PITPNM1	HGNC:9003; O00562
12199	PITPNM2	HGNC:21044; Q9BZ72
12200	PITPNM3	HGNC:21043; Q9BZ71
12201	PITRM1	HGNC:17663; Q5JRX3
12202	PITX1	HGNC:9004; P78337
12203	PITX2	HGNC:9005; Q99697
12204	PITX3	HGNC:9006; O75364
12205	PIWIL1	HGNC:9007; Q96J94
12206	PIWIL2	HGNC:17644; Q8TC59
12207	PIWIL3	HGNC:18443; Q7Z3Z3
12208	PIWIL4	HGNC:18444; Q7Z3Z4
12209	PJA1	HGNC:16648; Q8NG27
12210	PJA2	HGNC:17481; O43164
12211	PJVK	HGNC:29502; Q0ZLH3
12212	PKD1	HGNC:9008; P98161
12213	PKD1L1	HGNC:18053; Q8TDX9
12214	PKD1L2	HGNC:21715; Q7Z442
12215	PKD1L3	HGNC:21716; Q7Z443
12216	PKD2	HGNC:9009; Q13563
12217	PKD2L1	HGNC:9011; Q9P0L9
12218	PKD2L2	HGNC:9012; Q9NZM6
12219	PKDCC	HGNC:25123; Q504Y2
12220	PKDREJ	HGNC:9015; Q9NTG1
12221	PKHD1	HGNC:9016; P08F94
12222	PKHD1L1	HGNC:20313; Q86WI1
12223	PKIA	HGNC:9017; P61925
12224	PKIB	HGNC:9018; Q9C010
12225	PKIG	HGNC:9019; Q9Y2B9
12226	PKLR	HGNC:9020; P30613
12227	PKM	HGNC:9021; P14618
12228	PKMYT1	HGNC:29650; Q99640
12229	PKN1	HGNC:9405; Q16512
12230	PKN2	HGNC:9406; Q16513
12231	PKN3	HGNC:17999; Q6P5Z2
12232	PKNOX1	HGNC:9022; P55347
12233	PKNOX2	HGNC:16714; Q96KN3
12234	PKP1	HGNC:9023; Q13835
12235	PKP2	HGNC:9024; Q99959
12236	PKP3	HGNC:9025; Q9Y446
12237	PKP4	HGNC:9026; Q99569
12238	PLA1A	HGNC:17661; Q53H76
12239	PLA2G1B	HGNC:9030; P04054
12240	PLA2G2A	HGNC:9031; P14555
12241	PLA2G2C	HGNC:9032; Q5R387
12242	PLA2G2D	HGNC:9033; Q9UNK4
12243	PLA2G2E	HGNC:13414; Q9NZK7
12244	PLA2G2F	HGNC:30040; Q9BZM2
12245	PLA2G3	HGNC:17934; Q9NZ20
12246	PLA2G4A	HGNC:9035; P47712
12247	PLA2G4B	HGNC:9036; P0C869
12248	PLA2G4C	HGNC:9037; Q9UP65
12249	PLA2G4D	HGNC:30038; Q86XP0
12250	PLA2G4E	HGNC:24791; Q3MJ16
12251	PLA2G4F	HGNC:27396; Q68DD2
12252	PLA2G5	HGNC:9038; P39877
12253	PLA2G6	HGNC:9039; O60733
12254	PLA2G7	HGNC:9040; Q13093
12255	PLA2G10	HGNC:9029; O15496
12256	PLA2G12A	HGNC:18554; Q9BZM1
12257	PLA2G12B	HGNC:18555; Q9BX93
12258	PLA2G15	HGNC:17163; Q8NCC3
12259	PLA2R1	HGNC:9042; Q13018
12260	PLAA	HGNC:9043; Q9Y263
12261	PLAAT1	HGNC:14922; Q9HDD0
12262	PLAAT2	HGNC:17824; Q9NWW9
12263	PLAAT3	HGNC:17825; P53816
12264	PLAAT4	HGNC:9869; Q9UL19
12265	PLAAT5	HGNC:24978; Q96KN8
12266	PLAC1	HGNC:9044; Q9HBJ0
12267	PLAC8	HGNC:19254; Q9NZF1
12268	PLAC8L1	HGNC:31746; A1L4L8
12269	PLAC9	HGNC:19255; Q5JTB6
12270	PLAG1	HGNC:9045; Q6DJT9
12271	PLAGL1	HGNC:9046; Q9UM63
12272	PLAGL2	HGNC:9047; Q9UPG8
12273	PLAT	HGNC:9051; P00750
12274	PLAU	HGNC:9052; P00749
12275	PLAUR	HGNC:9053; Q03405
12276	PLB1	HGNC:30041; Q6P1J6
12277	PLBD1	HGNC:26215; Q6P4A8
12278	PLBD2	HGNC:27283; Q8NHP8
12279	PLCB1	HGNC:15917; Q9NQ66
12280	PLCB2	HGNC:9055; Q00722
12281	PLCB3	HGNC:9056; Q01970
12282	PLCB4	HGNC:9059; Q15147
12283	PLCD1	HGNC:9060; P51178
12284	PLCD3	HGNC:9061; Q8N3E9
12285	PLCD4	HGNC:9062; Q9BRC7
12286	PLCE1	HGNC:17175; Q9P212
12287	PLCG1	HGNC:9065; P19174
12288	PLCG2	HGNC:9066; P16885
12289	PLCH1	HGNC:29185; Q4KWH8
12290	PLCH2	HGNC:29037; O75038
12291	PLCL1	HGNC:9063; Q15111
12292	PLCL2	HGNC:9064; Q9UPR0
12293	PLCXD1	HGNC:23148; Q9NUJ7
12294	PLCXD2	HGNC:26462; Q0VAA5
12295	PLCXD3	HGNC:31822; Q63HM9
12296	PLCZ1	HGNC:19218; Q86YW0
12297	PLD1	HGNC:9067; Q13393
12298	PLD2	HGNC:9068; O14939
12299	PLD3	HGNC:17158; Q8IV08
12300	PLD4	HGNC:23792; Q96BZ4
12301	PLD5	HGNC:26879; Q8N7P1
12302	PLD6	HGNC:30447; Q8N2A8
12303	PLEC	HGNC:9069; Q15149
12304	PLEK	HGNC:9070; P08567
12305	PLEK2	HGNC:19238; Q9NYT0
12306	PLEKHA1	HGNC:14335; Q9HB21
12307	PLEKHA2	HGNC:14336; Q9HB19
12308	PLEKHA3	HGNC:14338; Q9HB20
12309	PLEKHA4	HGNC:14339; Q9H4M7
12310	PLEKHA5	HGNC:30036; Q9HAU0
12311	PLEKHA6	HGNC:17053; Q9Y2H5
12312	PLEKHA7	HGNC:27049; Q6IQ23
12313	PLEKHA8	HGNC:30037; Q96JA3
12314	PLEKHB1	HGNC:19079; Q9UF11
12315	PLEKHB2	HGNC:19236; Q96CS7
12316	PLEKHD1	HGNC:20148; A6NEE1
12317	PLEKHF1	HGNC:20764; Q96S99
12318	PLEKHF2	HGNC:20757; Q9H8W4
12319	PLEKHG1	HGNC:20884; Q9ULL1
12320	PLEKHG2	HGNC:29515; Q9H7P9
12321	PLEKHG3	HGNC:20364; A1L390
12322	PLEKHG4	HGNC:24501; Q58EX7
12323	PLEKHG4B	HGNC:29399; Q96PX9
12324	PLEKHG5	HGNC:29105; O94827
12325	PLEKHG6	HGNC:25562; Q3KR16
12326	PLEKHG7	HGNC:33829; Q6ZR37
12327	PLEKHH1	HGNC:17733; Q9ULM0
12328	PLEKHH2	HGNC:30506; Q8IVE3
12329	PLEKHH3	HGNC:26105; Q7Z736
12330	PLEKHJ1	HGNC:18211; Q9NW61
12331	PLEKHM1	HGNC:29017; Q9Y4G2
12332	PLEKHM2	HGNC:29131; Q8IWE5
12333	PLEKHM3	HGNC:34006; Q6ZWE6
12334	PLEKHN1	HGNC:25284; Q494U1
12335	PLEKHO1	HGNC:24310; Q53GL0
12336	PLEKHO2	HGNC:30026; Q8TD55
12337	PLEKHS1	HGNC:26285; Q5SXH7
12338	PLET1	HGNC:30053; Q6UQ28
12339	PLG	HGNC:9071; P00747
12340	PLGLB1	HGNC:9072; Q02325
12341	PLGLB2	HGNC:9073; Q02325
12342	PLGRKT	HGNC:23633; Q9HBL7
12343	PLIN1	HGNC:9076; O60240
12344	PLIN2	HGNC:248; Q99541
12345	PLIN3	HGNC:16893; O60664
12346	PLIN4	HGNC:29393; Q96Q06
12347	PLIN5	HGNC:33196; Q00G26
12348	PLK1	HGNC:9077; P53350
12349	PLK2	HGNC:19699; Q9NYY3
12350	PLK3	HGNC:2154; Q9H4B4
12351	PLK4	HGNC:11397; O00444
12352	PLK5	HGNC:27001; Q496M5
12353	PLLP	HGNC:18553; Q9Y342
12354	PLN	HGNC:9080; P26678
12355	PLOD1	HGNC:9081; Q02809
12356	PLOD2	HGNC:9082; O00469
12357	PLOD3	HGNC:9083; O60568
12358	PLP1	HGNC:9086; P60201
12359	PLP2	HGNC:9087; Q04941
12360	PLPBP	HGNC:9457; O94903
12361	PLPP1	HGNC:9228; O14494
12362	PLPP2	HGNC:9230; O43688
12363	PLPP3	HGNC:9229; O14495
12364	PLPP4	HGNC:23531; Q5VZY2
12365	PLPP5	HGNC:25026; Q8NEB5
12366	PLPP6	HGNC:23682; Q8IY26
12367	PLPP7	HGNC:28174; Q8NBV4
12368	PLPPR1	HGNC:25993; Q8TBJ4
12369	PLPPR2	HGNC:29566; Q96GM1
12370	PLPPR3	HGNC:23497; Q6T4P5
12371	PLPPR4	HGNC:23496; Q7Z2D5
12372	PLPPR5	HGNC:31703; Q32ZL2
12373	PLRG1	HGNC:9089; O43660
12374	PLS1	HGNC:9090; Q14651
12375	PLS3	HGNC:9091; P13797
12376	PLSCR1	HGNC:9092; O15162
12377	PLSCR2	HGNC:16494; Q9NRY7
12378	PLSCR3	HGNC:16495; Q9NRY6
12379	PLSCR4	HGNC:16497; Q9NRQ2
12380	PLSCR5	HGNC:19952; A0PG75
12381	PLTP	HGNC:9093; P55058
12382	PLVAP	HGNC:13635; Q9BX97
12383	PLXDC1	HGNC:20945; Q8IUK5
12384	PLXDC2	HGNC:21013; Q6UX71
12385	PLXNA1	HGNC:9099; Q9UIW2
12386	PLXNA2	HGNC:9100; O75051
12387	PLXNA3	HGNC:9101; P51805
12388	PLXNA4	HGNC:9102; Q9HCM2
12389	PLXNB1	HGNC:9103; O43157
12390	PLXNB2	HGNC:9104; O15031
12391	PLXNB3	HGNC:9105; Q9ULL4
12392	PLXNC1	HGNC:9106; O60486
12393	PLXND1	HGNC:9107; Q9Y4D7
12394	PM20D1	HGNC:26518; Q6GTS8
12395	PM20D2	HGNC:21408; Q8IYS1
12396	PMAIP1	HGNC:9108; Q13794
12397	PMCH	HGNC:9109; P20382
12398	PMEL	HGNC:10880; P40967
12399	PMEPA1	HGNC:14107; Q969W9
12400	PMF1	HGNC:9112; Q6P1K2
12401	PMFBP1	HGNC:17728; Q8TBY8
12402	PMIS2	HGNC:53649; A0A1W2PS18
12403	PML	HGNC:9113; P29590
12404	PMM1	HGNC:9114; Q92871
12405	PMM2	HGNC:9115; O15305
12406	PMP2	HGNC:9117; P02689
12407	PMP22	HGNC:9118; Q01453
12408	PMPCA	HGNC:18667; Q10713
12409	PMPCB	HGNC:9119; O75439
12410	PMS1	HGNC:9121; P54277
12411	PMS2	HGNC:9122; P54278
12412	PMVK	HGNC:9141; Q15126
12413	PNCK	HGNC:13415; Q6P2M8
12414	PNISR	HGNC:21222; Q8TF01
12415	PNKD	HGNC:9153; Q8N490
12416	PNKP	HGNC:9154; Q96T60
12417	PNLDC1	HGNC:21185; Q8NA58
12418	PNLIP	HGNC:9155; P16233
12419	PNLIPRP1	HGNC:9156; P54315
12420	PNLIPRP2	HGNC:9157; P54317
12421	PNLIPRP3	HGNC:23492; Q17RR3
12422	PNMA1	HGNC:9158; Q8ND90
12423	PNMA2	HGNC:9159; Q9UL42
12424	PNMA3	HGNC:18742; Q9UL41
12425	PNMA5	HGNC:18743; Q96PV4
12426	PNMA6A	HGNC:28248; P0CW24
12427	PNMA6E	HGNC:50767; A0A0J9YXQ4
12428	PNMA6F	HGNC:53119; A0A0J9YX94
12429	PNMA8A	HGNC:25578; Q86V59
12430	PNMA8B	HGNC:29206; Q9ULN7
12431	PNMA8C	HGNC:53427; A0A1B0GUJ8
12432	PNMT	HGNC:9160; P11086
12433	PNN	HGNC:9162; Q9H307
12434	PNO1	HGNC:32790; Q9NRX1
12435	PNOC	HGNC:9163; Q13519
12436	PNP	HGNC:7892; P00491
12437	PNPLA1	HGNC:21246; Q8N8W4
12438	PNPLA2	HGNC:30802; Q96AD5
12439	PNPLA3	HGNC:18590; Q9NST1
12440	PNPLA4	HGNC:24887; P41247
12441	PNPLA5	HGNC:24888; Q7Z6Z6
12442	PNPLA6	HGNC:16268; Q8IY17
12443	PNPLA7	HGNC:24768; Q6ZV29
12444	PNPLA8	HGNC:28900; Q9NP80
12445	PNPO	HGNC:30260; Q9NVS9
12446	PNPT1	HGNC:23166; Q8TCS8
12447	PNRC1	HGNC:17278; Q12796
12448	PNRC2	HGNC:23158; Q9NPJ4
12449	POC1A	HGNC:24488; Q8NBT0
12450	POC1B	HGNC:30836; Q8TC44
12451	POC5	HGNC:26658; Q8NA72
12452	PODN	HGNC:23174; Q7Z5L7
12453	PODNL1	HGNC:26275; Q6PEZ8
12454	PODXL	HGNC:9171; O00592
12455	PODXL2	HGNC:17936; Q9NZ53
12456	POF1B	HGNC:13711; Q8WVV4
12457	POFUT1	HGNC:14988; Q9H488
12458	POFUT2	HGNC:14683; Q9Y2G5
12459	POFUT3	HGNC:19234; Q6P4F1
12460	POFUT4	HGNC:19233; Q495W5
12461	POGK	HGNC:18800; Q9P215
12462	POGLUT1	HGNC:22954; Q8NBL1
12463	POGLUT2	HGNC:19350; Q6UW63
12464	POGLUT3	HGNC:28496; Q7Z4H8
12465	POGZ	HGNC:18801; Q7Z3K3
12466	POLA1	HGNC:9173; P09884
12467	POLA2	HGNC:30073; Q14181
12468	POLB	HGNC:9174; P06746
12469	POLD1	HGNC:9175; P28340
12470	POLD2	HGNC:9176; P49005
12471	POLD3	HGNC:20932; Q15054
12472	POLD4	HGNC:14106; Q9HCU8
12473	POLDIP2	HGNC:23781; Q9Y2S7
12474	POLDIP3	HGNC:23782; Q9BY77
12475	POLE	HGNC:9177; Q07864
12476	POLE2	HGNC:9178; P56282
12477	POLE3	HGNC:13546; Q9NRF9
12478	POLE4	HGNC:18755; Q9NR33
12479	POLG	HGNC:9179; P54098
12480	POLG2	HGNC:9180; Q9UHN1
12481	POLGARF	HGNC:56246; A0A3B3IS91
12482	POLH	HGNC:9181; Q9Y253
12483	POLI	HGNC:9182; Q9UNA4
12484	POLK	HGNC:9183; Q9UBT6
12485	POLL	HGNC:9184; Q9UGP5
12486	POLM	HGNC:9185; Q9NP87
12487	POLN	HGNC:18870; Q7Z5Q5
12488	POLQ	HGNC:9186; O75417
12489	POLR1A	HGNC:17264; O95602
12490	POLR1B	HGNC:20454; Q9H9Y6
12491	POLR1C	HGNC:20194; O15160
12492	POLR1D	HGNC:20422; P0DPB5, P0DPB6
12493	POLR1E	HGNC:17631; Q9GZS1
12494	POLR1F	HGNC:18027; Q3B726
12495	POLR1G	HGNC:24219; O15446
12496	POLR1H	HGNC:13182; Q9P1U0
12497	POLR2A	HGNC:9187; P24928
12498	POLR2B	HGNC:9188; P30876
12499	POLR2C	HGNC:9189; P19387
12500	POLR2D	HGNC:9191; O15514
12501	POLR2E	HGNC:9192; P19388
12502	POLR2F	HGNC:9193; P61218
12503	POLR2G	HGNC:9194; P62487
12504	POLR2H	HGNC:9195; P52434
12505	POLR2I	HGNC:9196; P36954
12506	POLR2J	HGNC:9197; P52435
12507	POLR2J2	HGNC:23208; Q9GZM3
12508	POLR2J3	HGNC:33853; Q9H1A7
12509	POLR2K	HGNC:9198; P53803
12510	POLR2L	HGNC:9199; P62875
12511	POLR2M	HGNC:14862; P0CAP2, Q6EEV4
12512	POLR3A	HGNC:30074; O14802
12513	POLR3B	HGNC:30348; Q9NW08
12514	POLR3C	HGNC:30076; Q9BUI4
12515	POLR3D	HGNC:1080; P05423
12516	POLR3E	HGNC:30347; Q9NVU0
12517	POLR3F	HGNC:15763; Q9H1D9
12518	POLR3G	HGNC:30075; O15318
12519	POLR3GL	HGNC:28466; Q9BT43
12520	POLR3H	HGNC:30349; Q9Y535
12521	POLR3K	HGNC:14121; Q9Y2Y1
12522	POLRMT	HGNC:9200; O00411
12523	POM121	HGNC:19702; Q96HA1
12524	POM121C	HGNC:34005; A8CG34
12525	POM121L2	HGNC:13973; Q96KW2
12526	POM121L12	HGNC:25369; Q8N7R1
12527	POMC	HGNC:9201; P01189
12528	POMGNT1	HGNC:19139; Q8WZA1
12529	POMGNT2	HGNC:25902; Q8NAT1
12530	POMK	HGNC:26267; Q9H5K3
12531	POMP	HGNC:20330; Q9Y244
12532	POMT1	HGNC:9202; Q9Y6A1
12533	POMT2	HGNC:19743; Q9UKY4
12534	POMZP3	HGNC:9203; Q6PJE2
12535	PON1	HGNC:9204; P27169
12536	PON2	HGNC:9205; Q15165
12537	PON3	HGNC:9206; Q15166
12538	POP1	HGNC:30129; Q99575
12539	POP4	HGNC:30081; O95707
12540	POP5	HGNC:17689; Q969H6
12541	POP7	HGNC:19949; O75817
12542	POPDC1	HGNC:1152; Q8NE79
12543	POPDC2	HGNC:17648; Q9HBU9
12544	POPDC3	HGNC:17649; Q9HBV1
12545	POR	HGNC:9208; P16435
12546	PORCN	HGNC:17652; Q9H237
12547	POSTN	HGNC:16953; Q15063
12548	POT1	HGNC:17284; Q9NUX5
12549	POTEA	HGNC:33893; Q6S8J7
12550	POTEB	HGNC:33734; A0A0A6YYL3
12551	POTEB2	HGNC:48327; H3BUK9
12552	POTEB3	HGNC:51240; A0JP26
12553	POTEC	HGNC:33894; B2RU33
12554	POTED	HGNC:23822; Q86YR6
12555	POTEE	HGNC:33895; Q6S8J3
12556	POTEF	HGNC:33905; A5A3E0
12557	POTEG	HGNC:33896; Q6S5H5
12558	POTEH	HGNC:133; Q6S545
12559	POTEI	HGNC:37093; P0CG38
12560	POTEJ	HGNC:37094; P0CG39
12561	POTEM	HGNC:37096; A6NI47
12562	POU1F1	HGNC:9210; P28069
12563	POU2AF1	HGNC:9211; Q16633
12564	POU2AF2	HGNC:30527; Q8IXP5
12565	POU2AF3	HGNC:26978; A8K830
12566	POU2F1	HGNC:9212; P14859
12567	POU2F2	HGNC:9213; P09086
12568	POU2F3	HGNC:19864; Q9UKI9
12569	POU3F1	HGNC:9214; Q03052
12570	POU3F2	HGNC:9215; P20265
12571	POU3F3	HGNC:9216; P20264
12572	POU3F4	HGNC:9217; P49335
12573	POU4F1	HGNC:9218; Q01851
12574	POU4F2	HGNC:9219; Q12837
12575	POU4F3	HGNC:9220; Q15319
12576	POU5F1	HGNC:9221; Q01860
12577	POU5F1B	HGNC:9223; Q06416
12578	POU5F2	HGNC:26367; Q8N7G0
12579	POU6F1	HGNC:9224; Q14863
12580	POU6F2	HGNC:21694; P78424
12581	PP2D1	HGNC:28406; A8MPX8
12582	PPA1	HGNC:9226; Q15181
12583	PPA2	HGNC:28883; Q9H2U2
12584	PPAN	HGNC:9227; Q9NQ55
12585	PPARA	HGNC:9232; Q07869
12586	PPARD	HGNC:9235; Q03181
12587	PPARG	HGNC:9236; P37231
12588	PPARGC1A	HGNC:9237; Q9UBK2
12589	PPARGC1B	HGNC:30022; Q86YN6
12590	PPAT	HGNC:9238; Q06203
12591	PPBP	HGNC:9240; P02775
12592	PPCDC	HGNC:28107; Q96CD2
12593	PPCS	HGNC:25686; Q9HAB8
12594	PPDPF	HGNC:16142; Q9H3Y8
12595	PPDPFL	HGNC:31745; Q8WWR9
12596	PPEF1	HGNC:9243; O14829
12597	PPEF2	HGNC:9244; O14830
12598	PPFIA1	HGNC:9245; Q13136
12599	PPFIA2	HGNC:9246; O75334
12600	PPFIA3	HGNC:9247; O75145
12601	PPFIA4	HGNC:9248; O75335
12602	PPFIBP1	HGNC:9249; Q86W92
12603	PPFIBP2	HGNC:9250; Q8ND30
12604	PPHLN1	HGNC:19369; Q8NEY8
12605	PPIA	HGNC:9253; P62937
12606	PPIAL4A	HGNC:24369; Q9Y536
12607	PPIAL4C	HGNC:33995; A0A0B4J2A2
12608	PPIAL4D	HGNC:33998; F5H284
12609	PPIAL4E	HGNC:33997; A0A075B759
12610	PPIAL4F	HGNC:33999; P0DN26
12611	PPIAL4G	HGNC:33996; P0DN37
12612	PPIAL4H	HGNC:53889; A0A075B767
12613	PPIB	HGNC:9255; P23284
12614	PPIC	HGNC:9256; P45877
12615	PPID	HGNC:9257; Q08752
12616	PPIE	HGNC:9258; Q9UNP9
12617	PPIF	HGNC:9259; P30405
12618	PPIG	HGNC:14650; Q13427
12619	PPIH	HGNC:14651; O43447
12620	PPIL1	HGNC:9260; Q9Y3C6
12621	PPIL2	HGNC:9261; Q13356
12622	PPIL3	HGNC:9262; Q9H2H8
12623	PPIL4	HGNC:15702; Q8WUA2
12624	PPIL6	HGNC:21557; Q8IXY8
12625	PPIP5K1	HGNC:29023; Q6PFW1
12626	PPIP5K2	HGNC:29035; O43314
12627	PPL	HGNC:9273; O60437
12628	PPM1A	HGNC:9275; P35813
12629	PPM1B	HGNC:9276; O75688
12630	PPM1D	HGNC:9277; O15297
12631	PPM1E	HGNC:19322; Q8WY54
12632	PPM1F	HGNC:19388; P49593
12633	PPM1G	HGNC:9278; O15355
12634	PPM1H	HGNC:18583; Q9ULR3
12635	PPM1J	HGNC:20785; Q5JR12
12636	PPM1K	HGNC:25415; Q8N3J5
12637	PPM1L	HGNC:16381; Q5SGD2
12638	PPM1M	HGNC:26506; Q96MI6
12639	PPM1N	HGNC:26845; Q8N819
12640	PPME1	HGNC:30178; Q9Y570
12641	PPOX	HGNC:9280; P50336
12642	PPP1CA	HGNC:9281; P62136
12643	PPP1CB	HGNC:9282; P62140
12644	PPP1CC	HGNC:9283; P36873
12645	PPP1R1A	HGNC:9286; Q13522
12646	PPP1R1B	HGNC:9287; Q9UD71
12647	PPP1R1C	HGNC:14940; Q8WVI7
12648	PPP1R2	HGNC:9288; P41236
12649	PPP1R2B	HGNC:16318; Q6NXS1
12650	PPP1R2C	HGNC:16324; O14990
12651	PPP1R3A	HGNC:9291; Q16821
12652	PPP1R3B	HGNC:14942; Q86XI6
12653	PPP1R3C	HGNC:9293; Q9UQK1
12654	PPP1R3D	HGNC:9294; O95685
12655	PPP1R3E	HGNC:14943; Q9H7J1
12656	PPP1R3F	HGNC:14944; Q6ZSY5
12657	PPP1R3G	HGNC:14945; B7ZBB8
12658	PPP1R7	HGNC:9295; Q15435
12659	PPP1R8	HGNC:9296; Q12972
12660	PPP1R9A	HGNC:14946; Q9ULJ8
12661	PPP1R9B	HGNC:9298; Q96SB3
12662	PPP1R10	HGNC:9284; Q96QC0
12663	PPP1R11	HGNC:9285; O60927
12664	PPP1R12A	HGNC:7618; O14974
12665	PPP1R12B	HGNC:7619; O60237
12666	PPP1R12C	HGNC:14947; Q9BZL4
12667	PPP1R13B	HGNC:14950; Q96KQ4
12668	PPP1R13L	HGNC:18838; Q8WUF5
12669	PPP1R14A	HGNC:14871; Q96A00
12670	PPP1R14B	HGNC:9057; Q96C90
12671	PPP1R14C	HGNC:14952; Q8TAE6
12672	PPP1R14D	HGNC:14953; Q9NXH3
12673	PPP1R15A	HGNC:14375; O75807
12674	PPP1R15B	HGNC:14951; Q5SWA1
12675	PPP1R16A	HGNC:14941; Q96I34
12676	PPP1R16B	HGNC:15850; Q96T49
12677	PPP1R17	HGNC:16973; O96001
12678	PPP1R18	HGNC:29413; Q6NYC8
12679	PPP1R21	HGNC:30595; Q6ZMI0
12680	PPP1R26	HGNC:29089; Q5T8A7
12681	PPP1R27	HGNC:16813; Q86WC6
12682	PPP1R35	HGNC:28320; Q8TAP8
12683	PPP1R36	HGNC:20097; Q96LQ0
12684	PPP1R37	HGNC:27607; O75864
12685	PPP1R42	HGNC:33732; Q7Z4L9
12686	PPP2CA	HGNC:9299; P67775
12687	PPP2CB	HGNC:9300; P62714
12688	PPP2R1A	HGNC:9302; P30153
12689	PPP2R1B	HGNC:9303; P30154
12690	PPP2R2A	HGNC:9304; P63151
12691	PPP2R2B	HGNC:9305; Q00005
12692	PPP2R2C	HGNC:9306; Q9Y2T4
12693	PPP2R2D	HGNC:23732; Q66LE6
12694	PPP2R3A	HGNC:9307; Q06190
12695	PPP2R3B	HGNC:13417; Q9Y5P8
12696	PPP2R3C	HGNC:17485; Q969Q6
12697	PPP2R5A	HGNC:9309; Q15172
12698	PPP2R5B	HGNC:9310; Q15173
12699	PPP2R5C	HGNC:9311; Q13362
12700	PPP2R5D	HGNC:9312; Q14738
12701	PPP2R5E	HGNC:9313; Q16537
12702	PPP3CA	HGNC:9314; Q08209
12703	PPP3CB	HGNC:9315; P16298
12704	PPP3CC	HGNC:9316; P48454
12705	PPP3R1	HGNC:9317; P63098
12706	PPP3R2	HGNC:9318; Q96LZ3
12707	PPP4C	HGNC:9319; P60510
12708	PPP4R1	HGNC:9320; Q8TF05
12709	PPP4R2	HGNC:18296; Q9NY27
12710	PPP4R3A	HGNC:20219; Q6IN85
12711	PPP4R3B	HGNC:29267; Q5MIZ7
12712	PPP4R3C	HGNC:33146; Q6ZMV5
12713	PPP4R4	HGNC:23788; Q6NUP7
12714	PPP5C	HGNC:9322; P53041
12715	PPP6C	HGNC:9323; O00743
12716	PPP6R1	HGNC:29195; Q9UPN7
12717	PPP6R2	HGNC:19253; O75170
12718	PPP6R3	HGNC:1173; Q5H9R7
12719	PPRC1	HGNC:30025; Q5VV67
12720	PPT1	HGNC:9325; P50897
12721	PPT2	HGNC:9326; Q9UMR5
12722	PPTC7	HGNC:30695; Q8NI37
12723	PPWD1	HGNC:28954; Q96BP3
12724	PPY	HGNC:9327; P01298
12725	PQBP1	HGNC:9330; O60828
12726	PRAC1	HGNC:30591; Q96KF2
12727	PRAC2	HGNC:30143; D3DTV9
12728	PRADC1	HGNC:16047; Q9BSG0
12729	PRAF2	HGNC:28911; O60831
12730	PRAG1	HGNC:25438; Q86YV5
12731	PRAM1	HGNC:30091; Q96QH2
12732	PRAME	HGNC:9336; P78395
12733	PRAMEF1	HGNC:28840; O95521
12734	PRAMEF2	HGNC:28841; O60811
12735	PRAMEF4	HGNC:31971; O60810
12736	PRAMEF5	HGNC:27995; Q5TYX0
12737	PRAMEF6	HGNC:30583; Q5VXH4
12738	PRAMEF7	HGNC:28415; Q5VXH5
12739	PRAMEF8	HGNC:24074; Q5VWM4
12740	PRAMEF9	HGNC:27996; P0DUQ2
12741	PRAMEF10	HGNC:27997; O60809
12742	PRAMEF11	HGNC:14086; O60813
12743	PRAMEF12	HGNC:22125; O95522
12744	PRAMEF13	HGNC:13262; Q5VWM6
12745	PRAMEF14	HGNC:13576; Q5SWL7
12746	PRAMEF15	HGNC:26764; P0DUQ1
12747	PRAMEF17	HGNC:29485; Q5VTA0
12748	PRAMEF18	HGNC:30693; Q5VWM3
12749	PRAMEF19	HGNC:24908; Q5SWL8
12750	PRAMEF20	HGNC:25224; Q5VT98
12751	PRAMEF25	HGNC:49179; A6NGN4
12752	PRAMEF26	HGNC:49178; H0Y7S4
12753	PRAMEF27	HGNC:51234; A3QJZ7
12754	PRAMEF33	HGNC:49193; A0A0G2JMD5
12755	PRAP1	HGNC:23304; Q96NZ9
12756	PRB1	HGNC:9337; P04280
12757	PRB2	HGNC:9338; P02812
12758	PRB3	HGNC:9339; Q04118
12759	PRB4	HGNC:9340; P10163
12760	PRC1	HGNC:9341; O43663
12761	PRCC	HGNC:9343; Q92733
12762	PRCD	HGNC:32528; Q00LT1
12763	PRCP	HGNC:9344; P42785
12764	PRDM1	HGNC:9346; O75626
12765	PRDM2	HGNC:9347; Q13029
12766	PRDM4	HGNC:9348; Q9UKN5
12767	PRDM5	HGNC:9349; Q9NQX1
12768	PRDM6	HGNC:9350; Q9NQX0
12769	PRDM7	HGNC:9351; Q9NQW5
12770	PRDM8	HGNC:13993; Q9NQV8
12771	PRDM9	HGNC:13994; Q9NQV7
12772	PRDM10	HGNC:13995; Q9NQV6
12773	PRDM11	HGNC:13996; Q9NQV5
12774	PRDM12	HGNC:13997; Q9H4Q4
12775	PRDM13	HGNC:13998; Q9H4Q3
12776	PRDM14	HGNC:14001; Q9GZV8
12777	PRDM15	HGNC:13999; P57071
12778	PRDM16	HGNC:14000; Q9HAZ2
12779	PRDX1	HGNC:9352; Q06830
12780	PRDX2	HGNC:9353; P32119
12781	PRDX3	HGNC:9354; P30048
12782	PRDX4	HGNC:17169; Q13162
12783	PRDX5	HGNC:9355; P30044
12784	PRDX6	HGNC:16753; P30041
12785	PREB	HGNC:9356; Q9HCU5
12786	PRELID1	HGNC:30255; Q9Y255
12787	PRELID2	HGNC:28306; Q8N945
12788	PRELID3A	HGNC:24639; Q96N28
12789	PRELID3B	HGNC:15892; Q9Y3B1
12790	PRELP	HGNC:9357; P51888
12791	PREP	HGNC:9358; P48147
12792	PREPL	HGNC:30228; Q4J6C6
12793	PREX1	HGNC:32594; Q8TCU6
12794	PREX2	HGNC:22950; Q70Z35
12795	PRF1	HGNC:9360; P14222
12796	PRG2	HGNC:9362; P13727
12797	PRG3	HGNC:9363; Q9Y2Y8
12798	PRG4	HGNC:9364; Q92954
12799	PRH1	HGNC:9366; P02810
12800	PRH2	HGNC:9367; P02810
12801	PRICKLE1	HGNC:17019; Q96MT3
12802	PRICKLE2	HGNC:20340; Q7Z3G6
12803	PRICKLE3	HGNC:6645; O43900
12804	PRICKLE4	HGNC:16805; Q2TBC4
12805	PRIM1	HGNC:9369; P49642
12806	PRIM2	HGNC:9370; P49643
12807	PRIMA1	HGNC:18319; Q86XR5
12808	PRIMPOL	HGNC:26575; Q96LW4
12809	PRKAA1	HGNC:9376; Q13131
12810	PRKAA2	HGNC:9377; P54646
12811	PRKAB1	HGNC:9378; Q9Y478
12812	PRKAB2	HGNC:9379; O43741
12813	PRKACA	HGNC:9380; P17612
12814	PRKACB	HGNC:9381; P22694
12815	PRKACG	HGNC:9382; P22612
12816	PRKAG1	HGNC:9385; P54619
12817	PRKAG2	HGNC:9386; Q9UGJ0
12818	PRKAG3	HGNC:9387; Q9UGI9
12819	PRKAR1A	HGNC:9388; P10644
12820	PRKAR1B	HGNC:9390; P31321
12821	PRKAR2A	HGNC:9391; P13861
12822	PRKAR2B	HGNC:9392; P31323
12823	PRKCA	HGNC:9393; P17252
12824	PRKCB	HGNC:9395; P05771
12825	PRKCD	HGNC:9399; Q05655
12826	PRKCE	HGNC:9401; Q02156
12827	PRKCG	HGNC:9402; P05129
12828	PRKCH	HGNC:9403; C0HM02, P24723
12829	PRKCI	HGNC:9404; P41743
12830	PRKCQ	HGNC:9410; Q04759
12831	PRKCSH	HGNC:9411; P14314
12832	PRKCZ	HGNC:9412; Q05513
12833	PRKD1	HGNC:9407; Q15139
12834	PRKD2	HGNC:17293; Q9BZL6
12835	PRKD3	HGNC:9408; O94806
12836	PRKDC	HGNC:9413; P78527
12837	PRKG1	HGNC:9414; Q13976
12838	PRKG2	HGNC:9416; Q13237
12839	PRKN	HGNC:8607; O60260
12840	PRKRA	HGNC:9438; O75569
12841	PRKRIP1	HGNC:21894; Q9H875
12842	PRKX	HGNC:9441; P51817
12843	PRL	HGNC:9445; P01236
12844	PRLH	HGNC:17945; P81277
12845	PRLHR	HGNC:4464; P49683
12846	PRLR	HGNC:9446; P16471
12847	PRM1	HGNC:9447; P04553
12848	PRM2	HGNC:9448; P04554
12849	PRM3	HGNC:13732; Q9NNZ6
12850	PRMT1	HGNC:5187; Q99873
12851	PRMT2	HGNC:5186; P55345
12852	PRMT3	HGNC:30163; O60678
12853	PRMT5	HGNC:10894; O14744
12854	PRMT6	HGNC:18241; Q96LA8
12855	PRMT7	HGNC:25557; Q9NVM4
12856	PRMT8	HGNC:5188; Q9NR22
12857	PRMT9	HGNC:25099; Q6P2P2
12858	PRND	HGNC:15748; Q9UKY0
12859	PRNP	HGNC:9449; F7VJQ1, P04156
12860	PROB1	HGNC:41906; E7EW31
12861	PROC	HGNC:9451; P04070
12862	PROCA1	HGNC:28600; Q8NCQ7
12863	PROCR	HGNC:9452; Q9UNN8
12864	PRODH	HGNC:9453; O43272
12865	PRODH2	HGNC:17325; Q9UF12
12866	PROK1	HGNC:18454; P58294
12867	PROK2	HGNC:18455; Q9HC23
12868	PROKR1	HGNC:4524; Q8TCW9
12869	PROKR2	HGNC:15836; Q8NFJ6
12870	PROM1	HGNC:9454; O43490
12871	PROM2	HGNC:20685; Q8N271
12872	PROP1	HGNC:9455; O75360
12873	PRORP	HGNC:19958; O15091
12874	PRORY	HGNC:38732; Q9H606
12875	PROS1	HGNC:9456; P07225
12876	PROSER1	HGNC:20291; Q86XN7
12877	PROSER2	HGNC:23728; Q86WR7
12878	PROSER3	HGNC:25204; Q2NL68
12879	PROX1	HGNC:9459; Q92786
12880	PROX2	HGNC:26715; Q3B8N5
12881	PROZ	HGNC:9460; P22891
12882	PRP4K	HGNC:17346; Q13523
12883	PRPF3	HGNC:17348; O43395
12884	PRPF4	HGNC:17349; O43172
12885	PRPF6	HGNC:15860; O94906
12886	PRPF8	HGNC:17340; Q6P2Q9
12887	PRPF18	HGNC:17351; Q99633
12888	PRPF19	HGNC:17896; Q9UMS4
12889	PRPF31	HGNC:15446; Q8WWY3
12890	PRPF38A	HGNC:25930; Q8NAV1
12891	PRPF38B	HGNC:25512; Q5VTL8
12892	PRPF39	HGNC:20314; Q86UA1
12893	PRPF40A	HGNC:16463; O75400
12894	PRPF40B	HGNC:25031; Q6NWY9
12895	PRPH	HGNC:9461; P41219
12896	PRPH2	HGNC:9942; P23942
12897	PRPS1	HGNC:9462; P60891
12898	PRPS1L1	HGNC:9463; P21108
12899	PRPS2	HGNC:9465; P11908
12900	PRPSAP1	HGNC:9466; Q14558
12901	PRPSAP2	HGNC:9467; O60256
12902	PRR3	HGNC:21149; P79522
12903	PRR4	HGNC:18020; Q16378
12904	PRR5	HGNC:31682; P85299
12905	PRR5L	HGNC:25878; Q6MZQ0
12906	PRR7	HGNC:28130; Q8TB68
12907	PRR9	HGNC:32057; Q5T870
12908	PRR11	HGNC:25619; Q96HE9
12909	PRR12	HGNC:29217; Q9ULL5
12910	PRR13	HGNC:24528; Q9NZ81
12911	PRR14	HGNC:28458; Q9BWN1
12912	PRR14L	HGNC:28738; Q5THK1
12913	PRR15	HGNC:22310; Q8IV56
12914	PRR15L	HGNC:28149; Q9BU68
12915	PRR16	HGNC:29654; Q569H4
12916	PRR18	HGNC:28574; Q8N4B5
12917	PRR19	HGNC:33728; A6NJB7
12918	PRR20A	HGNC:24754; P86496
12919	PRR20B	HGNC:37220; P86481
12920	PRR20C	HGNC:37221; P86479
12921	PRR20D	HGNC:37222; P86480
12922	PRR20E	HGNC:37223; P86478
12923	PRR20G	HGNC:53837; P0DPQ3
12924	PRR22	HGNC:28354; Q8IZ63
12925	PRR23A	HGNC:37172; A6NEV1
12926	PRR23B	HGNC:33764; Q6ZRT6
12927	PRR23C	HGNC:37173; Q6ZRP0
12928	PRR23D1	HGNC:49420; E9PI22
12929	PRR23D2	HGNC:49396; P0DMB1
12930	PRR23E	HGNC:32481; Q8N813
12931	PRR27	HGNC:33193; Q6MZM9
12932	PRR29	HGNC:25673; P0C7W0
12933	PRR30	HGNC:28677; Q53SZ7
12934	PRR32	HGNC:34498; B1ATL7
12935	PRR33	HGNC:35118; A8MZF0
12936	PRR35	HGNC:14139; P0CG20
12937	PRR36	HGNC:26172; Q9H6K5
12938	PRRC1	HGNC:28164; Q96M27
12939	PRRC2A	HGNC:13918; P48634
12940	PRRC2B	HGNC:28121; Q5JSZ5
12941	PRRC2C	HGNC:24903; Q9Y520
12942	PRRG1	HGNC:9469; O14668
12943	PRRG2	HGNC:9470; O14669
12944	PRRG3	HGNC:30798; Q9BZD7
12945	PRRG4	HGNC:30799; Q9BZD6
12946	PRRT1	HGNC:13943; Q99946
12947	PRRT1B	HGNC:53642; A0A1B0GWB2
12948	PRRT2	HGNC:30500; Q7Z6L0
12949	PRRT3	HGNC:26591; Q5FWE3
12950	PRRT4	HGNC:37280; C9JH25
12951	PRRX1	HGNC:9142; P54821
12952	PRRX2	HGNC:21338; Q99811
12953	PRSS1	HGNC:9475; P07477
12954	PRSS2	HGNC:9483; P07478
12955	PRSS3	HGNC:9486; P35030
12956	PRSS8	HGNC:9491; Q16651
12957	PRSS12	HGNC:9477; P56730
12958	PRSS16	HGNC:9480; Q9NQE7
12959	PRSS21	HGNC:9485; Q9Y6M0
12960	PRSS22	HGNC:14368; Q9GZN4
12961	PRSS23	HGNC:14370; O95084
12962	PRSS27	HGNC:15475; Q9BQR3
12963	PRSS33	HGNC:30405; Q8NF86
12964	PRSS35	HGNC:21387; Q8N3Z0
12965	PRSS36	HGNC:26906; Q5K4E3
12966	PRSS37	HGNC:29211; A4D1T9
12967	PRSS38	HGNC:29625; A1L453
12968	PRSS41	HGNC:30715; Q7RTY9
12969	PRSS48	HGNC:24635; Q7RTY5
12970	PRSS50	HGNC:17910; Q9UI38
12971	PRSS51	HGNC:37321; A0A1B0GVH4
12972	PRSS53	HGNC:34407; Q2L4Q9
12973	PRSS54	HGNC:26336; Q6PEW0
12974	PRSS55	HGNC:30824; Q6UWB4
12975	PRSS56	HGNC:39433; P0CW18
12976	PRSS57	HGNC:31397; Q6UWY2
12977	PRSS58	HGNC:39125; Q8IYP2
12978	PRTFDC1	HGNC:23333; Q9NRG1
12979	PRTG	HGNC:26373; Q2VWP7
12980	PRTN3	HGNC:9495; P24158
12981	PRUNE1	HGNC:13420; Q86TP1
12982	PRUNE2	HGNC:25209; Q8WUY3
12983	PRX	HGNC:13797; Q9BXM0
12984	PRXL2A	HGNC:28651; Q9BRX8
12985	PRXL2B	HGNC:28390; Q8TBF2
12986	PRXL2C	HGNC:16881; Q7RTV5
12987	PRY	HGNC:14024; O14603
12988	PRY2	HGNC:21504; O14603
12989	PSAP	HGNC:9498; P07602
12990	PSAPL1	HGNC:33131; Q6NUJ1
12991	PSAT1	HGNC:19129; Q9Y617
12992	PSCA	HGNC:9500; O43653
12993	PSD	HGNC:9507; A5PKW4
12994	PSD2	HGNC:19092; Q9BQI7
12995	PSD3	HGNC:19093; Q9NYI0
12996	PSD4	HGNC:19096; Q8NDX1
12997	PSEN1	HGNC:9508; P49768
12998	PSEN2	HGNC:9509; P49810
12999	PSENEN	HGNC:30100; Q9NZ42
13000	PSG1	HGNC:9514; P11464
13001	PSG2	HGNC:9519; P11465
13002	PSG3	HGNC:9520; Q16557
13003	PSG4	HGNC:9521; Q00888
13004	PSG5	HGNC:9522; Q15238
13005	PSG6	HGNC:9523; Q00889
13006	PSG7	HGNC:9524; Q13046
13007	PSG8	HGNC:9525; Q9UQ74
13008	PSG9	HGNC:9526; Q00887
13009	PSG11	HGNC:9516; Q9UQ72
13010	PSIP1	HGNC:9527; O75475
13011	PSKH1	HGNC:9529; P11801
13012	PSKH2	HGNC:18997; Q96QS6
13013	PSMA1	HGNC:9530; P25786
13014	PSMA2	HGNC:9531; P25787
13015	PSMA3	HGNC:9532; P25788
13016	PSMA4	HGNC:9533; P25789
13017	PSMA5	HGNC:9534; P28066
13018	PSMA6	HGNC:9535; P60900
13019	PSMA7	HGNC:9536; O14818
13020	PSMA8	HGNC:22985; Q8TAA3
13021	PSMB1	HGNC:9537; P20618
13022	PSMB2	HGNC:9539; P49721
13023	PSMB3	HGNC:9540; P49720
13024	PSMB4	HGNC:9541; P28070
13025	PSMB5	HGNC:9542; P28074
13026	PSMB6	HGNC:9543; P28072
13027	PSMB7	HGNC:9544; Q99436
13028	PSMB8	HGNC:9545; P28062
13029	PSMB9	HGNC:9546; P28065
13030	PSMB10	HGNC:9538; P40306
13031	PSMB11	HGNC:31963; A5LHX3
13032	PSMC1	HGNC:9547; P62191
13033	PSMC2	HGNC:9548; P35998
13034	PSMC3	HGNC:9549; P17980
13035	PSMC3IP	HGNC:17928; Q9P2W1
13036	PSMC4	HGNC:9551; P43686
13037	PSMC5	HGNC:9552; P62195
13038	PSMC6	HGNC:9553; P62333
13039	PSMD1	HGNC:9554; Q99460
13040	PSMD2	HGNC:9559; Q13200
13041	PSMD3	HGNC:9560; O43242
13042	PSMD4	HGNC:9561; P55036
13043	PSMD5	HGNC:9563; Q16401
13044	PSMD6	HGNC:9564; Q15008
13045	PSMD7	HGNC:9565; P51665
13046	PSMD8	HGNC:9566; P48556
13047	PSMD9	HGNC:9567; O00233
13048	PSMD10	HGNC:9555; O75832
13049	PSMD11	HGNC:9556; O00231
13050	PSMD12	HGNC:9557; O00232
13051	PSMD13	HGNC:9558; Q9UNM6
13052	PSMD14	HGNC:16889; O00487
13053	PSME1	HGNC:9568; Q06323
13054	PSME2	HGNC:9569; Q9UL46
13055	PSME3	HGNC:9570; P61289
13056	PSME3IP1	HGNC:29856; Q9GZU8
13057	PSME4	HGNC:20635; Q14997
13058	PSMF1	HGNC:9571; Q92530
13059	PSMG1	HGNC:3043; O95456
13060	PSMG2	HGNC:24929; Q969U7
13061	PSMG3	HGNC:22420; Q9BT73
13062	PSMG4	HGNC:21108; Q5JS54
13063	PSORS1C1	HGNC:17202; Q9UIG5
13064	PSORS1C2	HGNC:17199; Q9UIG4
13065	PSPC1	HGNC:20320; Q8WXF1
13066	PSPH	HGNC:9577; P78330
13067	PSPN	HGNC:9579; O60542
13068	PSRC1	HGNC:24472; Q6PGN9
13069	PSTK	HGNC:28578; Q8IV42
13070	PSTPIP1	HGNC:9580; O43586
13071	PSTPIP2	HGNC:9581; Q9H939
13072	PTAFR	HGNC:9582; P25105
13073	PTAR1	HGNC:30449; Q7Z6K3
13074	PTBP1	HGNC:9583; P26599
13075	PTBP2	HGNC:17662; Q9UKA9
13076	PTBP3	HGNC:10253; O95758
13077	PTCD1	HGNC:22198; O75127
13078	PTCD2	HGNC:25734; Q8WV60
13079	PTCD3	HGNC:24717; Q96EY7
13080	PTCH1	HGNC:9585; Q13635
13081	PTCH2	HGNC:9586; Q9Y6C5
13082	PTCHD1	HGNC:26392; Q96NR3
13083	PTCHD3	HGNC:24776; Q3KNS1
13084	PTCHD4	HGNC:21345; Q6ZW05
13085	PTCRA	HGNC:21290; Q6ISU1
13086	PTDSS1	HGNC:9587; P48651
13087	PTDSS2	HGNC:15463; Q9BVG9
13088	PTEN	HGNC:9588; P60484
13089	PTER	HGNC:9590; Q96BW5
13090	PTF1A	HGNC:23734; Q7RTS3
13091	PTGDR	HGNC:9591; Q13258
13092	PTGDR2	HGNC:4502; Q9Y5Y4
13093	PTGDS	HGNC:9592; P41222
13094	PTGER1	HGNC:9593; P34995
13095	PTGER2	HGNC:9594; P43116
13096	PTGER3	HGNC:9595; P43115
13097	PTGER4	HGNC:9596; P35408
13098	PTGES	HGNC:9599; O14684
13099	PTGES2	HGNC:17822; Q9H7Z7
13100	PTGES3	HGNC:16049; Q15185
13101	PTGES3L	HGNC:43943; E9PB15
13102	PTGFR	HGNC:9600; P43088
13103	PTGFRN	HGNC:9601; Q9P2B2
13104	PTGIR	HGNC:9602; P43119
13105	PTGIS	HGNC:9603; Q16647
13106	PTGR1	HGNC:18429; Q14914
13107	PTGR2	HGNC:20149; Q8N8N7
13108	PTGR3	HGNC:28697; Q8N4Q0
13109	PTGS1	HGNC:9604; P23219
13110	PTGS2	HGNC:9605; P35354
13111	PTH	HGNC:9606; P01270
13112	PTH1R	HGNC:9608; Q03431
13113	PTH2	HGNC:30828; Q96A98
13114	PTH2R	HGNC:9609; P49190
13115	PTHLH	HGNC:9607; P12272
13116	PTK2	HGNC:9611; Q05397
13117	PTK2B	HGNC:9612; Q14289
13118	PTK6	HGNC:9617; Q13882
13119	PTK7	HGNC:9618; Q13308
13120	PTMA	HGNC:9623; P06454
13121	PTMS	HGNC:9629; P20962
13122	PTN	HGNC:9630; P21246
13123	PTOV1	HGNC:9632; Q86YD1
13124	PTP4A1	HGNC:9634; Q93096
13125	PTP4A2	HGNC:9635; Q12974
13126	PTP4A3	HGNC:9636; O75365
13127	PTPA	HGNC:9308; Q15257
13128	PTPDC1	HGNC:30184; A2A3K4
13129	PTPMT1	HGNC:26965; Q8WUK0
13130	PTPN1	HGNC:9642; P18031
13131	PTPN2	HGNC:9650; P17706
13132	PTPN3	HGNC:9655; P26045
13133	PTPN4	HGNC:9656; P29074
13134	PTPN5	HGNC:9657; P54829
13135	PTPN6	HGNC:9658; P29350
13136	PTPN7	HGNC:9659; P35236
13137	PTPN9	HGNC:9661; P43378
13138	PTPN11	HGNC:9644; Q06124
13139	PTPN12	HGNC:9645; Q05209
13140	PTPN13	HGNC:9646; Q12923
13141	PTPN14	HGNC:9647; Q15678
13142	PTPN18	HGNC:9649; Q99952
13143	PTPN20	HGNC:23423; Q4JDL3
13144	PTPN21	HGNC:9651; Q16825
13145	PTPN22	HGNC:9652; Q9Y2R2
13146	PTPN23	HGNC:14406; Q9H3S7
13147	PTPRA	HGNC:9664; P18433
13148	PTPRB	HGNC:9665; P23467
13149	PTPRC	HGNC:9666; P08575
13150	PTPRCAP	HGNC:9667; Q14761
13151	PTPRD	HGNC:9668; P23468
13152	PTPRE	HGNC:9669; P23469
13153	PTPRF	HGNC:9670; P10586
13154	PTPRG	HGNC:9671; P23470
13155	PTPRH	HGNC:9672; Q9HD43
13156	PTPRJ	HGNC:9673; Q12913
13157	PTPRK	HGNC:9674; Q15262
13158	PTPRM	HGNC:9675; P28827
13159	PTPRN	HGNC:9676; Q16849
13160	PTPRN2	HGNC:9677; Q92932
13161	PTPRO	HGNC:9678; Q16827
13162	PTPRQ	HGNC:9679; Q9UMZ3
13163	PTPRR	HGNC:9680; Q15256
13164	PTPRS	HGNC:9681; Q13332
13165	PTPRT	HGNC:9682; O14522
13166	PTPRU	HGNC:9683; Q92729
13167	PTPRZ1	HGNC:9685; P23471
13168	PTRH1	HGNC:27039; Q86Y79
13169	PTRH2	HGNC:24265; Q9Y3E5
13170	PTRHD1	HGNC:33782; Q6GMV3
13171	PTS	HGNC:9689; Q03393
13172	PTTG1	HGNC:9690; O95997
13173	PTTG1IP	HGNC:13524; P53801
13174	PTTG1IP2	HGNC:55318; P0DTF9
13175	PTTG2	HGNC:9691; Q9NZH5
13176	PTX3	HGNC:9692; P26022
13177	PTX4	HGNC:14171; Q96A99
13178	PUDP	HGNC:16818; Q08623
13179	PUF60	HGNC:17042; Q9UHX1
13180	PUM1	HGNC:14957; Q14671
13181	PUM2	HGNC:14958; Q8TB72
13182	PUM3	HGNC:29676; Q15397
13183	PURA	HGNC:9701; Q00577
13184	PURB	HGNC:9702; Q96QR8
13185	PURG	HGNC:17930; Q9UJV8
13186	PUS1	HGNC:15508; Q9Y606
13187	PUS3	HGNC:25461; Q9BZE2
13188	PUS7	HGNC:26033; Q96PZ0
13189	PUS7L	HGNC:25276; Q9H0K6
13190	PUS10	HGNC:26505; Q3MIT2
13191	PUSL1	HGNC:26914; Q8N0Z8
13192	PVALB	HGNC:9704; P20472
13193	PVALEF	HGNC:40053; A0A1B0GWK0
13194	PVR	HGNC:9705; P15151
13195	PVRIG	HGNC:32190; Q6DKI7
13196	PWP1	HGNC:17015; Q13610
13197	PWP2	HGNC:9711; Q15269
13198	PWWP2A	HGNC:29406; Q96N64
13199	PWWP2B	HGNC:25150; Q6NUJ5
13200	PWWP3A	HGNC:29641; Q2TAK8
13201	PWWP3B	HGNC:26583; Q5H9M0
13202	PWWP4	HGNC:55197; A0A494C071
13203	PXDC1	HGNC:21361; Q5TGL8
13204	PXDN	HGNC:14966; Q92626
13205	PXDNL	HGNC:26359; A1KZ92
13206	PXK	HGNC:23326; Q7Z7A4
13207	PXMP2	HGNC:9716; Q9NR77
13208	PXMP4	HGNC:15920; Q9Y6I8
13209	PXN	HGNC:9718; P49023
13210	PXT1	HGNC:18312; Q8NFP0
13211	PXYLP1	HGNC:26303; Q8TE99
13212	PYCARD	HGNC:16608; Q9ULZ3
13213	PYCR1	HGNC:9721; P32322
13214	PYCR2	HGNC:30262; Q96C36
13215	PYCR3	HGNC:25846; Q53H96
13216	PYDC1	HGNC:30261; Q8WXC3
13217	PYDC2	HGNC:33512; Q56P42
13218	PYDC5	HGNC:53781; W6CW81
13219	PYGB	HGNC:9723; P11216
13220	PYGL	HGNC:9725; P06737
13221	PYGM	HGNC:9726; P11217
13222	PYGO1	HGNC:30256; Q9Y3Y4
13223	PYGO2	HGNC:30257; Q9BRQ0
13224	PYHIN1	HGNC:28894; Q6K0P9
13225	PYM1	HGNC:30258; Q9BRP8
13226	PYROXD1	HGNC:26162; Q8WU10
13227	PYROXD2	HGNC:23517; Q8N2H3
13228	PYURF	HGNC:44317; Q96I23
13229	PYY	HGNC:9748; P10082
13230	PZP	HGNC:9750; P20742
13231	QARS1	HGNC:9751; P47897
13232	QDPR	HGNC:9752; P09417
13233	QKI	HGNC:21100; Q96PU8
13234	QNG1	HGNC:28144; Q5T6V5
13235	QPCT	HGNC:9753; Q16769
13236	QPCTL	HGNC:25952; Q9NXS2
13237	QPRT	HGNC:9755; Q15274
13238	QRFP	HGNC:29982; P83859
13239	QRFPR	HGNC:15565; Q96P65
13240	QRICH1	HGNC:24713; Q2TAL8
13241	QRICH2	HGNC:25326; Q9H0J4
13242	QRSL1	HGNC:21020; Q9H0R6
13243	QSER1	HGNC:26154; Q2KHR3
13244	QSOX1	HGNC:9756; O00391
13245	QSOX2	HGNC:30249; Q6ZRP7
13246	QTGAL	HGNC:21727; Q67FW5
13247	QTMAN	HGNC:20887; Q4AE62
13248	QTRT1	HGNC:23797; Q9BXR0
13249	QTRT2	HGNC:25771; Q9H974
13250	R3HCC1	HGNC:27329; Q9Y3T6
13251	R3HCC1L	HGNC:23512; Q7Z5L2
13252	R3HDM1	HGNC:9757; Q15032
13253	R3HDM2	HGNC:29167; Q9Y2K5
13254	R3HDM4	HGNC:28270; Q96D70
13255	R3HDML	HGNC:16249; Q9H3Y0
13256	RAB1A	HGNC:9758; P62820
13257	RAB1B	HGNC:18370; Q9H0U4
13258	RAB2A	HGNC:9763; P61019
13259	RAB2B	HGNC:20246; Q8WUD1
13260	RAB3A	HGNC:9777; P20336
13261	RAB3B	HGNC:9778; P20337
13262	RAB3C	HGNC:30269; Q96E17
13263	RAB3D	HGNC:9779; O95716
13264	RAB3GAP1	HGNC:17063; Q15042
13265	RAB3GAP2	HGNC:17168; Q9H2M9
13266	RAB3IL1	HGNC:9780; Q8TBN0
13267	RAB3IP	HGNC:16508; Q96QF0
13268	RAB4A	HGNC:9781; P20338
13269	RAB4B	HGNC:9782; P61018
13270	RAB5A	HGNC:9783; P20339
13271	RAB5B	HGNC:9784; P61020
13272	RAB5C	HGNC:9785; P51148
13273	RAB5IF	HGNC:15870; Q9BUV8
13274	RAB6A	HGNC:9786; P20340
13275	RAB6B	HGNC:14902; Q9NRW1
13276	RAB6C	HGNC:16525; Q9H0N0
13277	RAB6D	HGNC:30272; Q53S08
13278	RAB7A	HGNC:9788; P51149
13279	RAB7B	HGNC:30513; Q96AH8
13280	RAB8A	HGNC:7007; P61006
13281	RAB8B	HGNC:30273; Q92930
13282	RAB9A	HGNC:9792; P51151
13283	RAB9B	HGNC:14090; Q9NP90
13284	RAB10	HGNC:9759; P61026
13285	RAB11A	HGNC:9760; P62491
13286	RAB11B	HGNC:9761; Q15907
13287	RAB11FIP1	HGNC:30265; Q6WKZ4
13288	RAB11FIP2	HGNC:29152; Q7L804
13289	RAB11FIP3	HGNC:17224; O75154
13290	RAB11FIP4	HGNC:30267; Q86YS3
13291	RAB11FIP5	HGNC:24845; Q9BXF6
13292	RAB12	HGNC:31332; Q6IQ22
13293	RAB13	HGNC:9762; P51153
13294	RAB14	HGNC:16524; P61106
13295	RAB15	HGNC:20150; P59190
13296	RAB17	HGNC:16523; Q9H0T7
13297	RAB18	HGNC:14244; Q9NP72
13298	RAB19	HGNC:19982; A4D1S5
13299	RAB20	HGNC:18260; Q9NX57
13300	RAB21	HGNC:18263; Q9UL25
13301	RAB22A	HGNC:9764; Q9UL26
13302	RAB23	HGNC:14263; Q9ULC3
13303	RAB24	HGNC:9765; Q969Q5
13304	RAB25	HGNC:18238; P57735
13305	RAB26	HGNC:14259; Q9ULW5
13306	RAB27A	HGNC:9766; P51159
13307	RAB27B	HGNC:9767; O00194
13308	RAB28	HGNC:9768; P51157
13309	RAB29	HGNC:9789; O14966
13310	RAB30	HGNC:9770; Q15771
13311	RAB31	HGNC:9771; Q13636
13312	RAB32	HGNC:9772; Q13637
13313	RAB33A	HGNC:9773; Q14088
13314	RAB33B	HGNC:16075; Q9H082
13315	RAB34	HGNC:16519; P0DI83, Q9BZG1
13316	RAB35	HGNC:9774; Q15286
13317	RAB36	HGNC:9775; O95755
13318	RAB37	HGNC:30268; Q96AX2
13319	RAB38	HGNC:9776; P57729
13320	RAB39A	HGNC:16521; Q14964
13321	RAB39B	HGNC:16499; Q96DA2
13322	RAB40A	HGNC:18283; Q8WXH6
13323	RAB40AL	HGNC:25410; P0C0E4
13324	RAB40B	HGNC:18284; Q12829
13325	RAB40C	HGNC:18285; Q96S21
13326	RAB41	HGNC:18293; Q5JT25
13327	RAB42	HGNC:28702; Q8N4Z0
13328	RAB43	HGNC:19983; Q86YS6
13329	RAB44	HGNC:21068; Q7Z6P3
13330	RABAC1	HGNC:9794; Q9UI14
13331	RABEP1	HGNC:17677; Q15276
13332	RABEP2	HGNC:24817; Q9H5N1
13333	RABEPK	HGNC:16896; Q7Z6M1
13334	RABGAP1	HGNC:17155; Q9Y3P9
13335	RABGAP1L	HGNC:24663; B7ZAP0, Q5R372
13336	RABGEF1	HGNC:17676; Q9UJ41
13337	RABGGTA	HGNC:9795; Q92696
13338	RABGGTB	HGNC:9796; P53611
13339	RABIF	HGNC:9797; P47224
13340	RABL2A	HGNC:9799; Q9UBK7
13341	RABL2B	HGNC:9800; Q9UNT1
13342	RABL3	HGNC:18072; Q5HYI8
13343	RABL6	HGNC:24703; Q3YEC7
13344	RAC1	HGNC:9801; P63000
13345	RAC2	HGNC:9802; P15153
13346	RAC3	HGNC:9803; P60763
13347	RACGAP1	HGNC:9804; Q9H0H5
13348	RACK1	HGNC:4399; P63244
13349	RAD1	HGNC:9806; O60671
13350	RAD9A	HGNC:9827; Q99638
13351	RAD9B	HGNC:21700; Q6WBX8
13352	RAD17	HGNC:9807; O75943
13353	RAD18	HGNC:18278; Q9NS91
13354	RAD21	HGNC:9811; O60216
13355	RAD21L1	HGNC:16271; Q9H4I0
13356	RAD23A	HGNC:9812; P54725
13357	RAD23B	HGNC:9813; P54727
13358	RAD50	HGNC:9816; Q92878
13359	RAD51	HGNC:9817; Q06609
13360	RAD51AP1	HGNC:16956; Q96B01
13361	RAD51AP2	HGNC:34417; Q09MP3
13362	RAD51B	HGNC:9822; O15315
13363	RAD51C	HGNC:9820; O43502
13364	RAD51D	HGNC:9823; O75771
13365	RAD52	HGNC:9824; P43351
13366	RAD54B	HGNC:17228; Q9Y620
13367	RAD54L	HGNC:9826; Q92698
13368	RAD54L2	HGNC:29123; Q9Y4B4
13369	RADIL	HGNC:22226; Q96JH8
13370	RADX	HGNC:25486; Q6NSI4
13371	RAE1	HGNC:9828; P78406
13372	RAET1E	HGNC:16793; Q8TD07
13373	RAET1G	HGNC:16795; Q6H3X3
13374	RAET1L	HGNC:16798; Q5VY80
13375	RAF1	HGNC:9829; P04049
13376	RAG1	HGNC:9831; P15918
13377	RAG2	HGNC:9832; P55895
13378	RAI1	HGNC:9834; Q7Z5J4
13379	RAI2	HGNC:9835; Q9Y5P3
13380	RAI14	HGNC:14873; Q9P0K7
13381	RALA	HGNC:9839; P11233
13382	RALB	HGNC:9840; P11234
13383	RALBP1	HGNC:9841; Q15311
13384	RALGAPA1	HGNC:17770; Q6GYQ0
13385	RALGAPA2	HGNC:16207; Q2PPJ7
13386	RALGAPB	HGNC:29221; Q86X10
13387	RALGDS	HGNC:9842; Q12967
13388	RALGPS1	HGNC:16851; Q5JS13
13389	RALGPS2	HGNC:30279; Q86X27
13390	RALY	HGNC:15921; Q9UKM9
13391	RALYL	HGNC:27036; Q86SE5
13392	RAMAC	HGNC:31022; Q9BTL3
13393	RAMACL	HGNC:21234; A0A3B3IU46
13394	RAMP1	HGNC:9843; O60894
13395	RAMP2	HGNC:9844; O60895
13396	RAMP3	HGNC:9845; O60896
13397	RAN	HGNC:9846; P62826
13398	RANBP1	HGNC:9847; P43487
13399	RANBP2	HGNC:9848; P49792
13400	RANBP3	HGNC:9850; Q9H6Z4
13401	RANBP3L	HGNC:26353; Q86VV4
13402	RANBP6	HGNC:9851; O60518
13403	RANBP9	HGNC:13727; Q96S59
13404	RANBP10	HGNC:29285; Q6VN20
13405	RANBP17	HGNC:14428; Q9H2T7
13406	RANGAP1	HGNC:9854; P46060
13407	RANGRF	HGNC:17679; Q9HD47
13408	RAP1A	HGNC:9855; P62834
13409	RAP1B	HGNC:9857; P61224
13410	RAP1GAP	HGNC:9858; P47736
13411	RAP1GAP2	HGNC:29176; Q684P5
13412	RAP1GDS1	HGNC:9859; P52306
13413	RAP2A	HGNC:9861; P10114
13414	RAP2B	HGNC:9862; P61225
13415	RAP2C	HGNC:21165; Q9Y3L5
13416	RAPGEF1	HGNC:4568; Q13905
13417	RAPGEF2	HGNC:16854; Q9Y4G8
13418	RAPGEF3	HGNC:16629; O95398
13419	RAPGEF4	HGNC:16626; Q8WZA2
13420	RAPGEF5	HGNC:16862; Q92565
13421	RAPGEF6	HGNC:20655; Q8TEU7
13422	RAPGEFL1	HGNC:17428; Q9UHV5
13423	RAPH1	HGNC:14436; Q70E73
13424	RAPSN	HGNC:9863; Q13702
13425	RARA	HGNC:9864; P10276
13426	RARB	HGNC:9865; P10826
13427	RARG	HGNC:9866; P13631
13428	RARRES1	HGNC:9867; P49788
13429	RARRES2	HGNC:9868; Q99969
13430	RARS1	HGNC:9870; P54136
13431	RARS2	HGNC:21406; Q5T160
13432	RASA1	HGNC:9871; P20936
13433	RASA2	HGNC:9872; Q15283
13434	RASA3	HGNC:20331; Q14644
13435	RASA4	HGNC:23181; O43374
13436	RASA4B	HGNC:35202; C9J798
13437	RASAL1	HGNC:9873; O95294
13438	RASAL2	HGNC:9874; Q9UJF2
13439	RASAL3	HGNC:26129; Q86YV0
13440	RASD1	HGNC:15828; Q9Y272
13441	RASD2	HGNC:18229; Q96D21
13442	RASEF	HGNC:26464; Q8IZ41
13443	RASGEF1A	HGNC:24246; Q8N9B8
13444	RASGEF1B	HGNC:24881; Q0VAM2
13445	RASGEF1C	HGNC:27400; Q8N431
13446	RASGRF1	HGNC:9875; Q13972
13447	RASGRF2	HGNC:9876; O14827
13448	RASGRP1	HGNC:9878; O95267
13449	RASGRP2	HGNC:9879; Q7LDG7
13450	RASGRP3	HGNC:14545; Q8IV61
13451	RASGRP4	HGNC:18958; Q8TDF6
13452	RASIP1	HGNC:24716; Q5U651
13453	RASL10A	HGNC:16954; Q92737
13454	RASL10B	HGNC:30295; Q96S79
13455	RASL11A	HGNC:23802; Q6T310
13456	RASL11B	HGNC:23804; Q9BPW5
13457	RASL12	HGNC:30289; Q9NYN1
13458	RASSF1	HGNC:9882; Q9NS23
13459	RASSF2	HGNC:9883; P50749
13460	RASSF3	HGNC:14271; Q86WH2
13461	RASSF4	HGNC:20793; Q9H2L5
13462	RASSF5	HGNC:17609; Q8WWW0
13463	RASSF6	HGNC:20796; Q6ZTQ3
13464	RASSF7	HGNC:1166; Q02833
13465	RASSF8	HGNC:13232; Q8NHQ8
13466	RASSF9	HGNC:15739; O75901
13467	RASSF10	HGNC:33984; A6NK89
13468	RAVER1	HGNC:30296; Q8IY67
13469	RAVER2	HGNC:25577; Q9HCJ3
13470	RAX	HGNC:18662; Q9Y2V3
13471	RAX2	HGNC:18286; Q96IS3
13472	RB1	HGNC:9884; P06400
13473	RB1CC1	HGNC:15574; Q8TDY2
13474	RBAK	HGNC:17680; Q9NYW8
13475	RBBP4	HGNC:9887; Q09028
13476	RBBP5	HGNC:9888; Q15291
13477	RBBP6	HGNC:9889; Q7Z6E9
13478	RBBP7	HGNC:9890; Q16576
13479	RBBP8	HGNC:9891; Q99708
13480	RBBP8NL	HGNC:16144; Q8NC74
13481	RBBP9	HGNC:9892; O75884
13482	RBCK1	HGNC:15864; Q9BYM8
13483	RBFA	HGNC:26120; Q8N0V3
13484	RBFOX1	HGNC:18222; Q9NWB1
13485	RBFOX2	HGNC:9906; O43251
13486	RBFOX3	HGNC:27097; A6NFN3
13487	RBIS	HGNC:32235; Q8N0T1
13488	RBKS	HGNC:30325; Q9H477
13489	RBL1	HGNC:9893; P28749
13490	RBL2	HGNC:9894; Q08999
13491	RBM3	HGNC:9900; P98179
13492	RBM4	HGNC:9901; Q9BWF3
13493	RBM4B	HGNC:28842; Q9BQ04
13494	RBM5	HGNC:9902; P52756
13495	RBM6	HGNC:9903; P78332
13496	RBM7	HGNC:9904; Q9Y580
13497	RBM8A	HGNC:9905; Q9Y5S9
13498	RBM10	HGNC:9896; P0DW28, P98175
13499	RBM11	HGNC:9897; P57052
13500	RBM12	HGNC:9898; Q9NTZ6
