= OR13C3 =

Protein-coding gene in the species Homo sapiens

Identifiers
- Aliases: OR13C3, OR37G, OR9-8, olfactory receptor family 13 subfamily C member 3
- External IDs: MGI: 3030107; GeneCards: OR13C3

Gene location (Human)
Chr.	Chromosome 9 (human)
Band	9q31.1	Start	104,535,749 bp
Band	9q31.1	End	104,536,856 bp

Gene location (Mouse)
Chr.	Chromosome 4 (mouse)
Band	4|4 B2	Start	52,852,154 bp
Band	4|4 B2	End	52,859,236 bp
RNA expression pattern
Bgee	Human / Mouse (ortholog); Top expressed in: gonad / Top expressed in: respiratory epithelium; spermatid; peripheral nervous system; nasal epithelium; olfactory epithelium; testicle; More reference expression data
BioGPS	n/a
Gene ontology
Molecular function	G protein-coupled receptor activity; olfactory receptor activity; signal transducer activity
Cellular component	integral component of membrane; plasma membrane; membrane
Biological process	sensory perception of smell; signal transduction; response to stimulus; detection of chemical stimulus involved in sensory perception of smell; G protein-coupled receptor signaling pathway
Sources:Amigo / QuickGO
Orthologs
Databases	NCBI: entry; OMA: entry
Species	Human	Mouse
Entrez	138803	258821
Ensembl	ENSG00000204246	ENSMUSG00000049648
UniProt	Q8NGS6	Q8VG87
RefSeq (mRNA)	NM_001001961	NM_146824
RefSeq (protein)	NP_001001961	NP_667035
Location (UCSC)	Chr 9: 104.54 – 104.54 Mb	Chr 4: 52.85 – 52.86 Mb
PubMed search
- Wikidata
View/Edit Human	View/Edit Mouse

Olfactory receptor 13C3 is a protein that in humans is encoded by the OR13C3 gene.

Olfactory receptors interact with odorant molecules in the nose, to initiate a neuronal response that triggers the perception of a smell. The olfactory receptor proteins are members of a large family of G-protein-coupled receptors (GPCR) arising from single coding-exon genes. Olfactory receptors share a 7-transmembrane domain structure with many neurotransmitter and hormone receptors and are responsible for the recognition and G protein-mediated transduction of odorant signals. The olfactory receptor gene family is the largest in the genome. The nomenclature assigned to the olfactory receptor genes and proteins for this organism is independent of other organisms.

== See also ==
- Olfactory receptor
