= OR5D14 =

Protein-coding gene in the species Homo sapiens

Identifiers
- Aliases: OR5D14, OR11-141, OR11-150, olfactory receptor family 5 subfamily D member 14
- External IDs: MGI: 3030996; GeneCards: OR5D14

Gene location (Human)
Chr.	Chromosome 11 (human)
Band	11q11	Start	55,795,556 bp
Band	11q11	End	55,796,500 bp

Gene location (Mouse)
Chr.	Chromosome 2 (mouse)
Band	2|2 D	Start	87,876,264 bp
Band	2|2 D	End	87,881,473 bp
RNA expression pattern
Bgee	Human / Mouse (ortholog); Top expressed in: testicle; ascending aorta / Top expressed in: morula; More reference expression data
BioGPS	n/a
Gene ontology
Molecular function	G protein-coupled receptor activity; odorant binding; olfactory receptor activity; signal transducer activity
Cellular component	integral component of membrane; plasma membrane; membrane
Biological process	sensory perception of smell; signal transduction; response to stimulus; detection of chemical stimulus involved in sensory perception of smell; G protein-coupled receptor signaling pathway
Sources:Amigo / QuickGO
Orthologs
Databases	NCBI: entry; OMA: entry
Species	Human	Mouse
Entrez	219436	258105
Ensembl	ENSG00000186113	ENSMUSG00000075139
UniProt	Q8NGL3	Q7TR28
RefSeq (mRNA)	NM_001004735	NM_001011835
RefSeq (protein)	NP_001004735	NP_001011835
Location (UCSC)	Chr 11: 55.8 – 55.8 Mb	Chr 2: 87.88 – 87.88 Mb
PubMed search
- Wikidata
View/Edit Human	View/Edit Mouse

Olfactory receptor 5D14 is a protein that in humans is encoded by the OR5D14 gene.

Olfactory receptors interact with odorant molecules in the nose, to initiate a neuronal response that triggers the perception of a smell. The olfactory receptor proteins are members of a large family of G-protein-coupled receptors (GPCR) arising from single coding-exon genes. Olfactory receptors share a 7-transmembrane domain structure with many neurotransmitter and hormone receptors and are responsible for the recognition and G protein-mediated transduction of odorant signals. The olfactory receptor gene family is the largest in the genome. The nomenclature assigned to the olfactory receptor genes and proteins for this organism is independent of other organisms.

== See also ==
- Olfactory receptor
