= OR5D13 =

Protein-coding gene in the species Homo sapiens

Identifiers
- Aliases: OR5D13, olfactory receptor family 5 subfamily D member 13 (gene/pseudogene), olfactory receptor family 5 subfamily D member 13
- External IDs: GeneCards: OR5D13

Gene location (Human)
Chr.	Chromosome 11 (human)
Band	11q11	Start	55,773,438 bp
Band	11q11	End	55,774,382 bp
Gene ontology
Molecular function	signal transducer activity; olfactory receptor activity; G protein-coupled receptor activity; odorant binding
Cellular component	plasma membrane; membrane; integral component of membrane
Biological process	sensory perception of smell; signal transduction; response to stimulus; detection of chemical stimulus involved in sensory perception of smell; G protein-coupled receptor signaling pathway
Sources:Amigo / QuickGO
Orthologs
Databases	NCBI: entry; OMA: entry
Species	Human	Mouse
Entrez	390142	n/a
Ensembl	ENSG00000279761	n/a
UniProt	Q8NGL4	n/a
RefSeq (mRNA)	NM_001001967	n/a
RefSeq (protein)	NP_001001967	n/a
Location (UCSC)	Chr 11: 55.77 – 55.77 Mb	n/a
PubMed search		n/a
- Wikidata
View/Edit Human

Olfactory receptor 5D13 is a protein that in humans is encoded by the OR5D13 gene.

Olfactory receptors interact with odorant molecules in the nose, to initiate a neuronal response that triggers the perception of a smell. The olfactory receptor proteins are members of a large family of G-protein-coupled receptors (GPCR) arising from single coding-exon genes. Olfactory receptors share a 7-transmembrane domain structure with many neurotransmitter and hormone receptors and are responsible for the recognition and G protein-mediated transduction of odorant signals. The olfactory receptor gene family is the largest in the genome. The nomenclature assigned to the olfactory receptor genes and proteins for this organism is independent of other organisms.

== See also ==
- Olfactory receptor
