= Proline rich 13 =

Protein-coding gene in the species Homo sapiens

PRR13

Identifiers
- Aliases: PRR13, TXR1, proline rich 13
- External IDs: OMIM: 610459; HomoloGene: 137328; GeneCards: PRR13; OMA:PRR13 - orthologs
RNA expression pattern
Bgee	Human / Mouse (ortholog); Top expressed in: duodenum; kidney; blood; rectum; bone marrow cell; body of stomach; monocyte; gallbladder; appendix; spleen / n/a; More reference expression data
BioGPS	n/a
Gene ontology
Molecular function	protein binding
Cellular component	nucleus; nucleoplasm; cytosol
Biological process	regulation of transcription, DNA-templated; transcription, DNA-templated
Sources:Amigo / QuickGO
Orthologs
Species	Human	Mouse
Entrez	54458	n/a
Ensembl	n/a	n/a
UniProt	Q9NZ81	n/a
RefSeq (mRNA)	NM_018457; NM_001005354; NM_001005355	n/a
RefSeq (protein)	NP_001005354; NP_060927	n/a
Location (UCSC)	n/a	n/a
PubMed search		n/a
- Wikidata
View/Edit Human

Proline rich 13 is a protein that in humans is encoded by the PRR13 gene.

== See also ==
- Proline
