= OR5H6 =

Protein-coding gene in the species Homo sapiens

Identifiers
- Aliases: OR5H6, OR3-11, olfactory receptor family 5 subfamily H member 6 (gene/pseudogene), olfactory receptor family 5 subfamily H member 6
- External IDs: MGI: 3030021; GeneCards: OR5H6

Gene location (Human)
Chr.	Chromosome 3 (human)
Band	3q11.2	Start	98,263,252 bp
Band	3q11.2	End	98,265,356 bp

Gene location (Mouse)
Chr.	Chromosome 16 (mouse)
Band	16|16 C1.3	Start	58,855,926 bp
Band	16|16 C1.3	End	58,860,130 bp
RNA expression pattern
Bgee	Human / Mouse (ortholog); Top expressed in: placenta / n/a; More reference expression data
BioGPS	n/a
Gene ontology
Molecular function	G protein-coupled receptor activity; odorant binding; signal transducer activity; olfactory receptor activity
Cellular component	integral component of membrane; membrane; plasma membrane
Biological process	sensory perception of smell; signal transduction; response to stimulus; detection of chemical stimulus involved in sensory perception of smell; G protein-coupled receptor signaling pathway
Sources:Amigo / QuickGO
Orthologs
Databases	NCBI: entry; OMA: entry
Species	Human	Mouse
Entrez	79295	258319
Ensembl	ENSG00000230301	ENSMUSG00000043357
UniProt	Q8NGV6	Q8VEX6
RefSeq (mRNA)	NM_001005479	NM_146322
RefSeq (protein)	NP_001005479	NP_666434
Location (UCSC)	Chr 3: 98.26 – 98.27 Mb	Chr 16: 58.86 – 58.86 Mb
PubMed search
- Wikidata
View/Edit Human	View/Edit Mouse

Olfactory receptor 5H6 is a protein that in humans is encoded by the OR5H6 gene.

Olfactory receptors interact with odorant molecules in the nose, to initiate a neuronal response that triggers the perception of a smell. The olfactory receptor proteins are members of a large family of G-protein-coupled receptors (GPCR) arising from single coding-exon genes. Olfactory receptors share a 7-transmembrane domain structure with many neurotransmitter and hormone receptors and are responsible for the recognition and G protein-mediated transduction of odorant signals. The olfactory receptor gene family is the largest in the genome. The nomenclature assigned to the olfactory receptor genes and proteins for this organism is independent of other organisms.

== See also ==
- Olfactory receptor
