= OR10AG1 =

Protein-coding gene in the species Homo sapiens

Identifiers
- Aliases: OR10AG1, OR11-160, olfactory receptor family 10 subfamily AG member 1
- External IDs: MGI: 3030957; GeneCards: OR10AG1

Gene location (Human)
Chr.	Chromosome 11 (human)
Band	11q12.1	Start	55,965,755 bp
Band	11q12.1	End	55,969,945 bp

Gene location (Mouse)
Chr.	Chromosome 2 (mouse)
Band	2|2 D	Start	87,246,979 bp
Band	2|2 D	End	87,253,555 bp
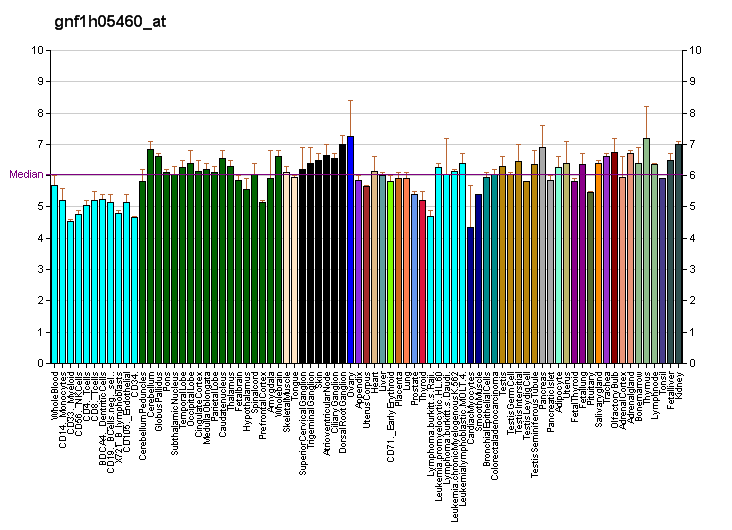
RNA expression pattern
Bgee	Human / Mouse (ortholog); Top expressed in: multicellular organism / n/a; More reference expression data
BioGPS	More reference expression data
Gene ontology
Molecular function	G protein-coupled receptor activity; olfactory receptor activity; signal transducer activity
Cellular component	integral component of membrane; plasma membrane; membrane
Biological process	sensory perception of smell; signal transduction; response to stimulus; detection of chemical stimulus involved in sensory perception of smell; G protein-coupled receptor signaling pathway
Sources:Amigo / QuickGO
Orthologs
Databases	NCBI: entry; OMA: entry
Species	Human	Mouse
Entrez	282770	258347
Ensembl	ENSG00000174970	ENSMUSG00000043274
UniProt	Q8NH19	A2AT85
RefSeq (mRNA)	NM_001005491	NM_146350
RefSeq (protein)	NP_001005491	NP_666462
Location (UCSC)	Chr 11: 55.97 – 55.97 Mb	Chr 2: 87.25 – 87.25 Mb
PubMed search
- Wikidata
View/Edit Human	View/Edit Mouse

Olfactory receptor 10AG1 is a protein that in humans is encoded by the OR10AG1 gene.

Olfactory receptors interact with odorant molecules in the nose, to initiate a neuronal response that triggers the perception of a smell. The olfactory receptor proteins are members of a large family of G-protein-coupled receptors (GPCR) arising from single coding-exon genes. Olfactory receptors share a 7-transmembrane domain structure with many neurotransmitter and hormone receptors and are responsible for the recognition and G protein-mediated transduction of odorant signals. The olfactory receptor gene family is the largest in the genome. The nomenclature assigned to the olfactory receptor genes and proteins for this organism is independent of other organisms.

== See also ==
- Olfactory receptor
