= PTP4A3 =

Protein-coding gene in the species Homo sapiens

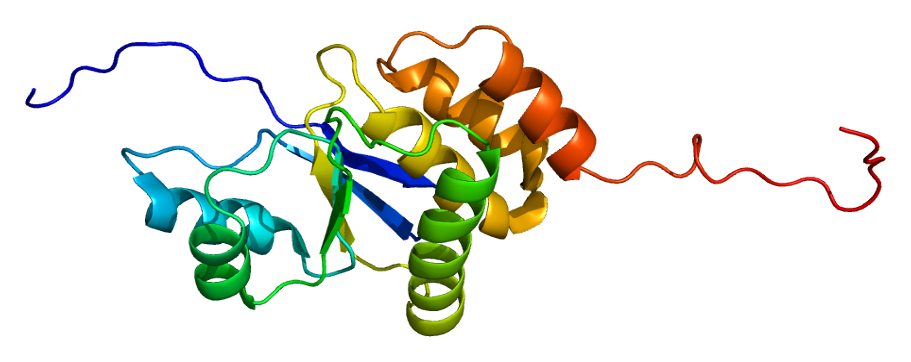

Identifiers
- Aliases: PTP4A3, PRL-3, PRL-R, PRL3, protein tyrosine phosphatase type IVA, member 3, protein tyrosine phosphatase 4A3
- External IDs: OMIM: 606449; MGI: 1277098; GeneCards: PTP4A3
Available structures
| PDB | Ortholog search: PDBe RCSB |
| PDB | List of PDB id codes 1R6H, 1V3A, 2MBC |
Enzyme activity
| EC # | BRENDA | ExPASy | KEGG | MetaCyc |
|---|---|---|---|---|
| 3.1.3.48 | ↗ | ↗ | ↗ | ↗ |

Gene location (Human)
| Chr. | Chromosome 8 (human) |
| Band | 8q24.3 | Start | 141,391,995 bp |
| Band | 8q24.3 | End | 141,432,454 bp |

Gene location (Mouse)
| Chr. | Chromosome 15 (mouse) |
| Band | 15|15 D3 | Start | 73,594,994 bp |
| Band | 15|15 D3 | End | 73,630,615 bp |
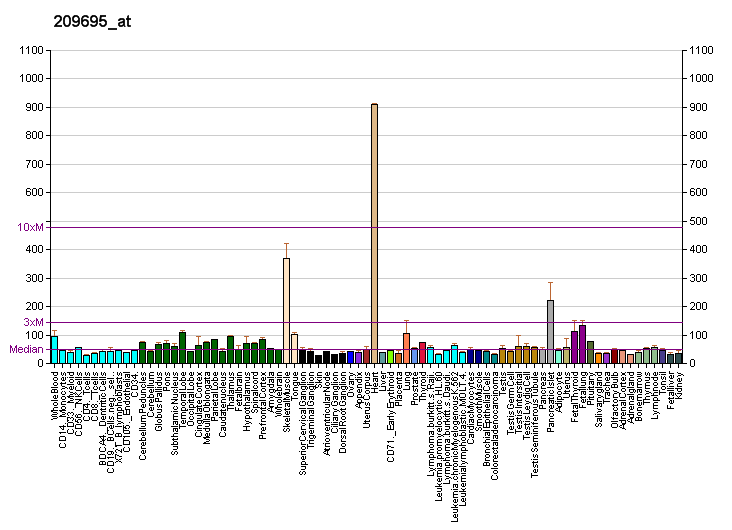

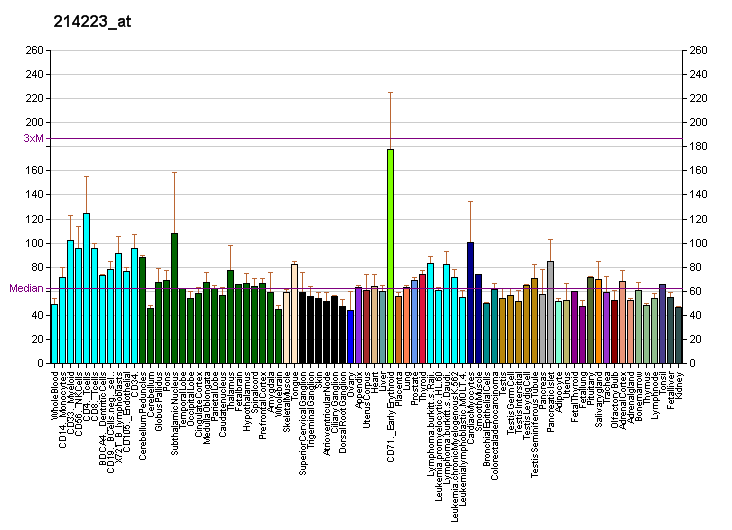

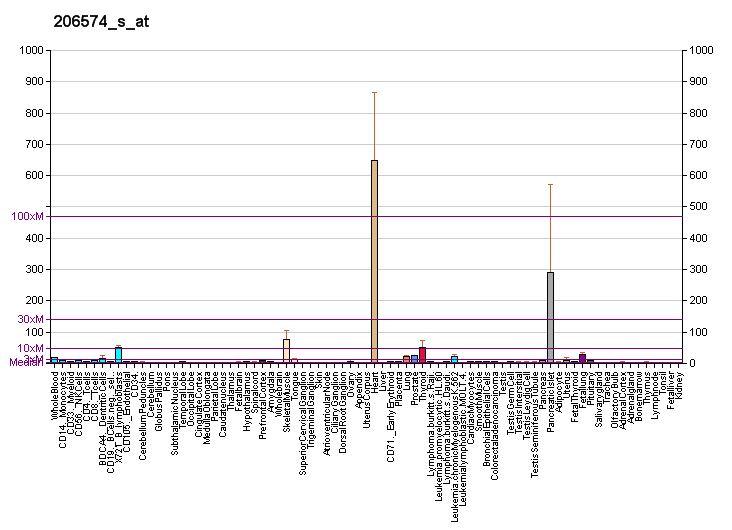
RNA expression pattern
| Bgee | Human / Mouse (ortholog); Top expressed in: apex of heart; gastric mucosa; muscle of thigh; left ventricle; gastrocnemius muscle; right auricle of heart; skeletal muscle tissue; anterior pituitary; tibial arteries; right coronary artery / Top expressed in: muscle of thigh; extensor digitorum longus muscle; blood; plantaris muscle; medial head of gastrocnemius muscle; tibialis anterior muscle; neural layer of retina; digastric muscle; knee joint; triceps brachii muscle; More reference expression data |
| BioGPS | More reference expression data |
Gene ontology
| Molecular function | protein tyrosine phosphatase activity; prenylated protein tyrosine phosphatase activity; phosphatase activity; phosphoprotein phosphatase activity; hydrolase activity; protein tyrosine/serine/threonine phosphatase activity; protein binding |
| Cellular component | endosome; plasma membrane; early endosome; membrane; nucleus; cytoplasm |
| Biological process | Notch signaling pathway; protein dephosphorylation; positive regulation of vascular permeability; regulation of vascular endothelial growth factor signaling pathway; endothelial cell migration; dephosphorylation; peptidyl-tyrosine dephosphorylation; regulation of transcription, DNA-templated; positive regulation of NIK/NF-kappaB signaling; positive regulation of establishment of protein localization; cellular response to leukemia inhibitory factor |
Sources:Amigo / QuickGO
Orthologs
| Databases | NCBI: entry; OMA: entry |
| Species | Human | Mouse |
| Entrez | 11156 | 19245 |
| Ensembl | ENSG00000184489; ENSG00000275575 | ENSMUSG00000059895 |
| UniProt | O75365 | Q9D658 |
| RefSeq (mRNA) | NM_007079; NM_032611 | NM_001166388; NM_001166389; NM_001166390; NM_008975; NM_001357591 |
| RefSeq (protein) | NP_009010; NP_116000 | NP_001159860; NP_001159861; NP_001159862; NP_033001; NP_001344520 |
| Location (UCSC) | Chr 8: 141.39 – 141.43 Mb | Chr 15: 73.59 – 73.63 Mb |
| PubMed search |
- Wikidata
| View/Edit Human | View/Edit Mouse |

Protein tyrosine phosphatase type IVA 3 is an enzyme that in humans is encoded by the PTP4A3 gene.

The protein encoded by this gene belongs to a small class of prenylated protein tyrosine phosphatases (PTPs). PTPs are cell signaling molecules that play regulatory roles in a variety of cellular processes. This class of PTPs contain a PTP domain and a characteristic C-terminal prenylation motif. Studies of this class of PTPs in mice demonstrated that they were prenylated proteins in vivo, which suggested their association with cell plasma membrane. Overexpression of this gene in mammalian cells was reported to inhibit angiotensin-II induced cell calcium mobilization and promote cell growth. Two alternatively spliced variants exist.
