= OR56A1 =

Protein-coding gene in the species Homo sapiens

Identifiers
- Aliases: OR56A1, OR11-75, olfactory receptor family 56 subfamily A member 1
- External IDs: GeneCards: OR56A1

Gene location (Human)
Chr.	Chromosome 11 (human)
Band	11p15.4	Start	6,019,336 bp
Band	11p15.4	End	6,034,338 bp
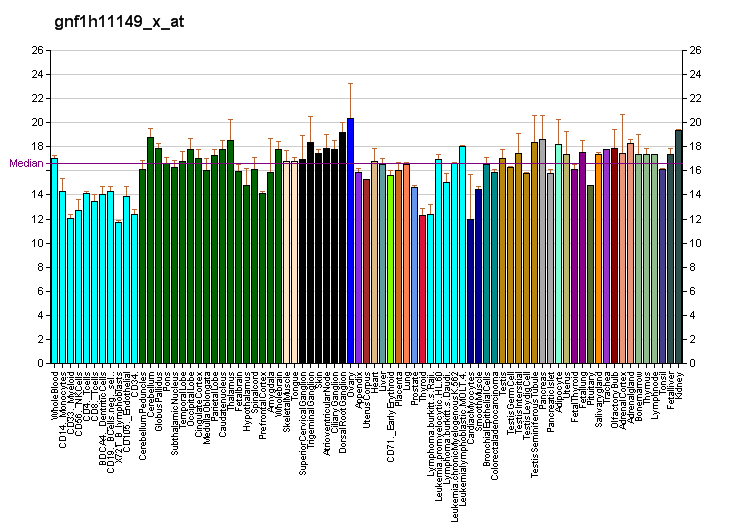

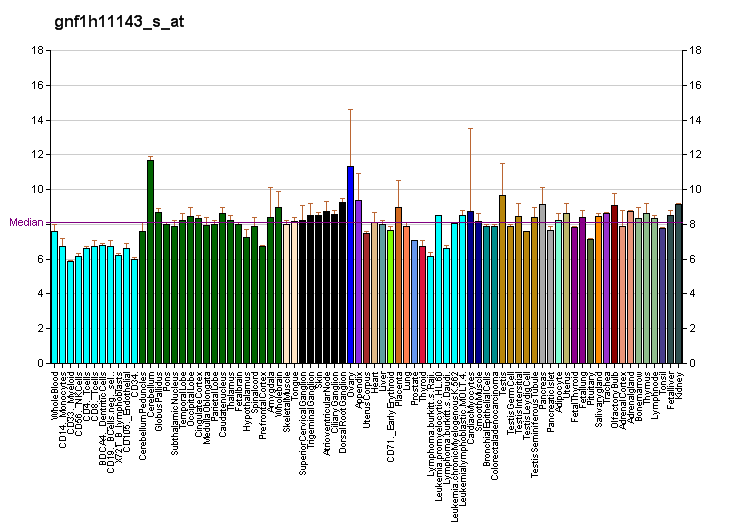

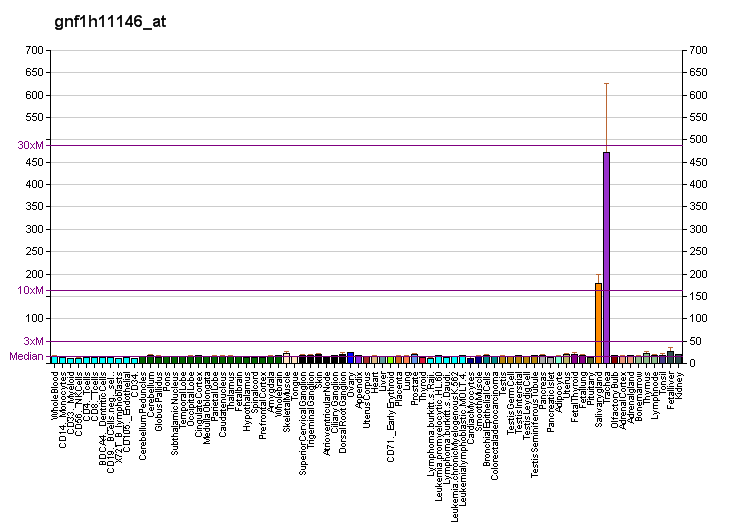
RNA expression pattern
Bgee	Human / Mouse (ortholog); Top expressed in: testicle; left testis / n/a; More reference expression data
BioGPS	More reference expression data
Gene ontology
Molecular function	G protein-coupled receptor activity; olfactory receptor activity; signal transducer activity; adrenergic receptor activity; dopamine neurotransmitter receptor activity, coupled via Gi/Go; dopamine binding
Cellular component	integral component of membrane; plasma membrane; integral component of plasma membrane; membrane; synaptic vesicle membrane; intracellular anatomical structure
Biological process	adenylate cyclase-activating adrenergic receptor signaling pathway; sensory perception of smell; detection of chemical stimulus involved in sensory perception of smell; signal transduction; response to stimulus; synaptic transmission, dopaminergic; negative regulation of adenylate cyclase activity; adenylate cyclase-inhibiting dopamine receptor signaling pathway; response to toxic substance; regulation of dopamine secretion; regulation of potassium ion transport; behavioral response to cocaine; behavioral response to ethanol; negative regulation of cytosolic calcium ion concentration; negative regulation of synaptic transmission, glutamatergic; phospholipase C-activating dopamine receptor signaling pathway; negative regulation of voltage-gated calcium channel activity; G protein-coupled receptor signaling pathway; adrenergic receptor signaling pathway; adenylate cyclase-modulating G protein-coupled receptor signaling pathway
Sources:Amigo / QuickGO
Orthologs
Databases	NCBI: entry; OMA: entry
Species	Human	Mouse
Entrez	120796	n/a
Ensembl	ENSG00000180934	n/a
UniProt	Q8NGH5	n/a
RefSeq (mRNA)	NM_001001917; NM_001388488	n/a
RefSeq (protein)	NP_001001917	n/a
Location (UCSC)	Chr 11: 6.02 – 6.03 Mb	n/a
PubMed search		n/a
- Wikidata
View/Edit Human

Olfactory receptor 56A1 is a protein that in humans is encoded by the OR56A1 gene.

Olfactory receptors interact with odorant molecules in the nose, to initiate a neuronal response that triggers the perception of a smell. The olfactory receptor proteins are members of a large family of G-protein-coupled receptors (GPCR) arising from single coding-exon genes. Olfactory receptors share a 7-transmembrane domain structure with many neurotransmitter and hormone receptors and are responsible for the recognition and G protein-mediated transduction of odorant signals. The olfactory receptor gene family is the largest in the genome. The nomenclature assigned to the olfactory receptor genes and proteins for this organism is independent of other organisms.

== See also ==
- Olfactory receptor
