= OR5T2 =

Protein-coding gene in the species Homo sapiens

Identifiers
- Aliases: OR5T2, OR11-177, olfactory receptor family 5 subfamily T member 2
- External IDs: MGI: 3030920; GeneCards: OR5T2

Gene location (Human)
| Chr. | Chromosome 11 (human) |
| Band | 11q12.1 | Start | 56,231,282 bp |
| Band | 11q12.1 | End | 56,234,255 bp |

Gene location (Mouse)
| Chr. | Chromosome 2 (mouse) |
| Band | 2|2 D | Start | 86,506,562 bp |
| Band | 2|2 D | End | 86,510,436 bp |
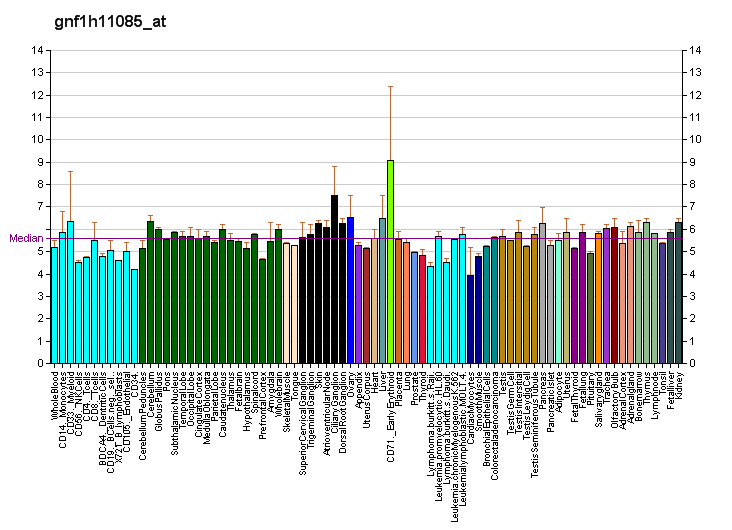

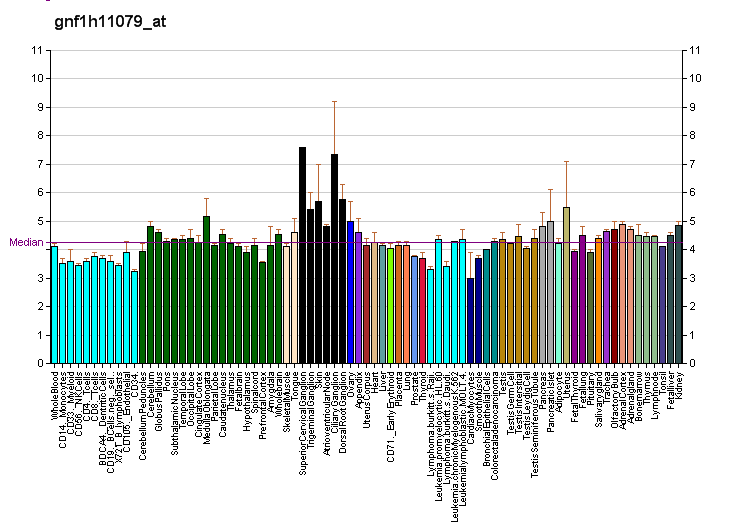

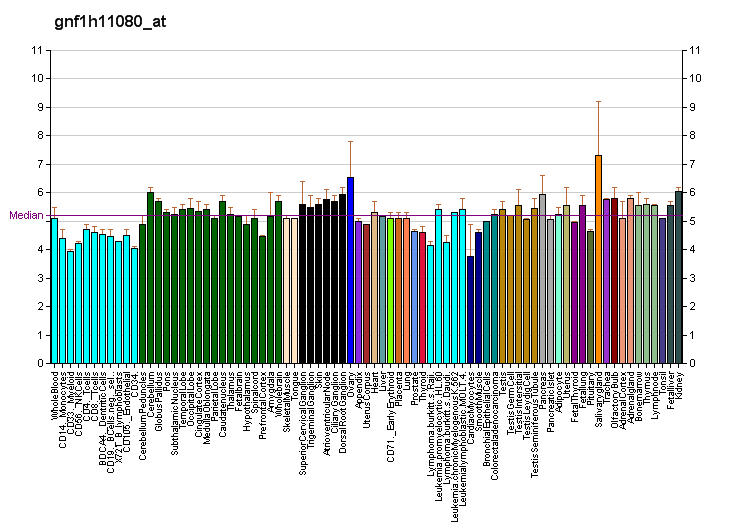
RNA expression pattern
| Bgee | Human / Mouse (ortholog); Top expressed in: endometrium / n/a; More reference expression data |
| BioGPS | More reference expression data |
Gene ontology
| Molecular function | G protein-coupled receptor activity; olfactory receptor activity; signal transducer activity; neurotransmitter receptor activity; G protein-coupled serotonin receptor activity |
| Cellular component | integral component of membrane; plasma membrane; membrane; integral component of plasma membrane; dendrite |
| Biological process | sensory perception of smell; detection of chemical stimulus involved in sensory perception of smell; signal transduction; response to stimulus; G protein-coupled serotonin receptor signaling pathway; G protein-coupled receptor signaling pathway; G protein-coupled receptor signaling pathway, coupled to cyclic nucleotide second messenger; chemical synaptic transmission |
Sources:Amigo / QuickGO
Orthologs
| Databases | NCBI: entry; OMA: entry |
| Species | Human | Mouse |
| Entrez | 219464 | 258585 |
| Ensembl | ENSG00000181718; ENSG00000262851 | ENSMUSG00000075175 |
| UniProt | Q8NGG2 | Q8VFL9 |
| RefSeq (mRNA) | NM_001004746 | NM_146592 |
| RefSeq (protein) | NP_001004746 | NP_666803 |
| Location (UCSC) | Chr 11: 56.23 – 56.23 Mb | Chr 2: 86.51 – 86.51 Mb |
| PubMed search |
- Wikidata
| View/Edit Human | View/Edit Mouse |

Olfactory receptor 5T2 is a protein that in humans is encoded by the OR5T2 gene.

Olfactory receptors interact with odorant molecules in the nose, to initiate a neuronal response that triggers the perception of a smell. The olfactory receptor proteins are members of a large family of G-protein-coupled receptors (GPCR) arising from single coding-exon genes. Olfactory receptors share a 7-transmembrane domain structure with many neurotransmitter and hormone receptors and are responsible for the recognition and G protein-mediated transduction of odorant signals. The olfactory receptor gene family is the largest in the genome. The nomenclature assigned to the olfactory receptor genes and proteins for this organism is independent of other organisms.

== See also ==
- Olfactory receptor
