= OR10Z1 =

Protein-coding gene in humans

Identifiers
- Aliases: OR10Z1, OR1-15, olfactory receptor family 10 subfamily Z member 1
- External IDs: MGI: 3030253; GeneCards: OR10Z1

Gene location (Human)
Chr.	Chromosome 1 (human)
Band	1q23.1	Start	158,605,268 bp
Band	1q23.1	End	158,612,514 bp

Gene location (Mouse)
Chr.	Chromosome 1 (mouse)
Band	1|1 H3	Start	174,076,080 bp
Band	1|1 H3	End	174,079,627 bp
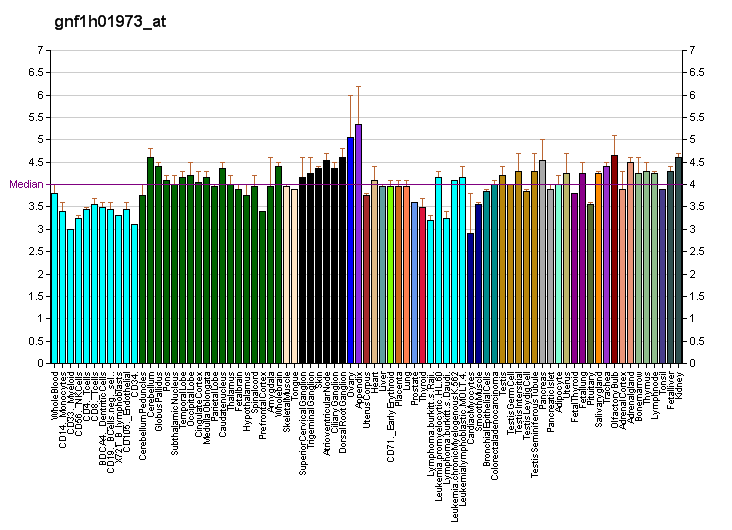

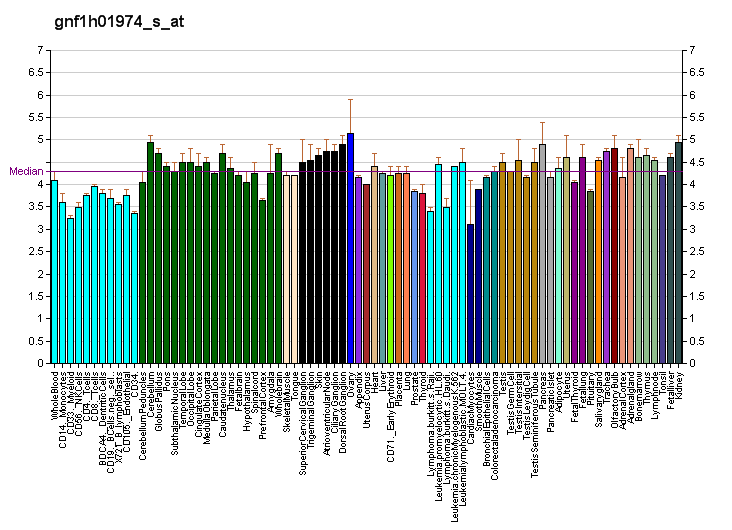

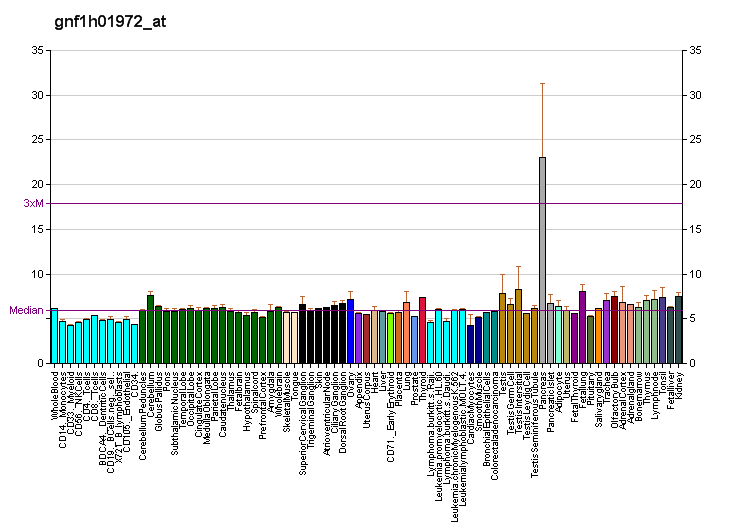
RNA expression pattern
Bgee	Human / Mouse (ortholog); Top expressed in: testicle; bone marrow; nucleus accumbens; putamen; Brodmann area 9; prefrontal cortex; caudate nucleus; anterior cingulate cortex; amygdala; hippocampus proper / Top expressed in: bone marrow; More reference expression data
BioGPS	More reference expression data
Gene ontology
Molecular function	G protein-coupled receptor activity; olfactory receptor activity; transmembrane signaling receptor activity; signal transducer activity
Cellular component	integral component of membrane; plasma membrane; membrane
Biological process	G protein-coupled receptor signaling pathway; sensory perception of smell; detection of chemical stimulus involved in sensory perception of smell; detection of chemical stimulus involved in sensory perception; signal transduction; response to stimulus
Sources:Amigo / QuickGO
Orthologs
Databases	NCBI: entry; OMA: entry
Species	Human	Mouse
Entrez	128368	258710
Ensembl	ENSG00000198967	ENSMUSG00000050788
UniProt	Q8NGY1	n/a
RefSeq (mRNA)	NM_001004478	NM_146715
RefSeq (protein)	NP_001004478	n/a
Location (UCSC)	Chr 1: 158.61 – 158.61 Mb	Chr 1: 174.08 – 174.08 Mb
PubMed search
- Wikidata
View/Edit Human	View/Edit Mouse

Olfactory receptor 10Z1 is a protein that in humans is encoded by the OR10Z1 gene.

Olfactory receptors interact with odorant molecules in the nose, to initiate a neuronal response that triggers the perception of a smell. The olfactory receptor proteins are members of a large family of G-protein-coupled receptors (GPCR) arising from single coding-exon genes. Olfactory receptors share a 7-transmembrane domain structure with many neurotransmitter and hormone receptors and are responsible for the recognition and G protein-mediated transduction of odorant signals. The olfactory receptor gene family is the largest in the genome. The nomenclature assigned to the olfactory receptor genes and proteins for this organism is independent of other organisms.

== See also ==
- Olfactory receptor
