= OR5H2 =

Protein-coding gene in the species Homo sapiens

Identifiers
- Aliases: OR5H2, OR3-10, olfactory receptor family 5 subfamily H member 2
- External IDs: MGI: 3030030; GeneCards: OR5H2

Gene location (Human)
Chr.	Chromosome 3 (human)
Band	3q11.2	Start	98,282,505 bp
Band	3q11.2	End	98,284,070 bp

Gene location (Mouse)
Chr.	Chromosome 16 (mouse)
Band	16|16 C1.3	Start	58,987,010 bp
Band	16|16 C1.3	End	58,990,817 bp
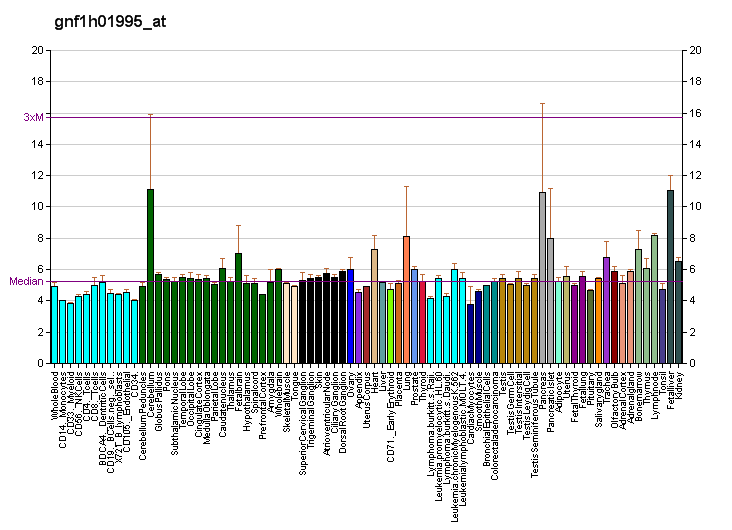

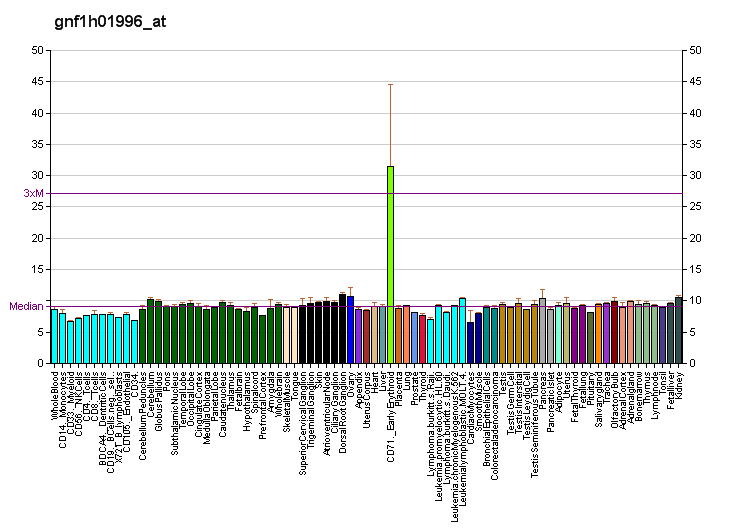

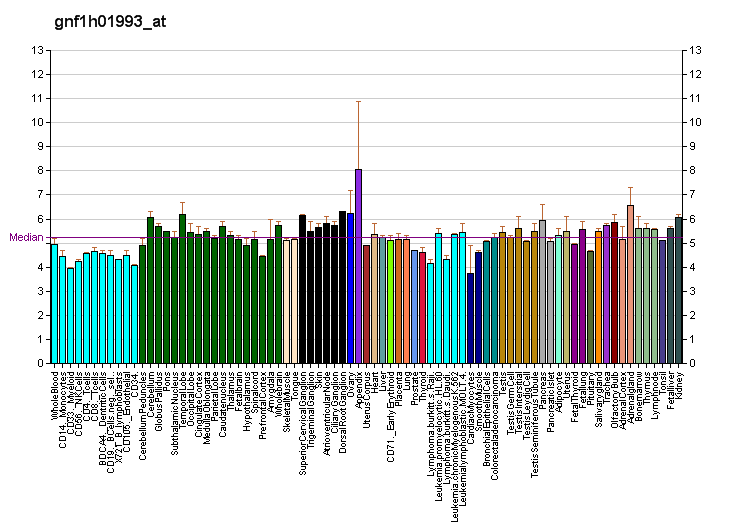
RNA expression pattern
Bgee	Human / Mouse (ortholog); Top expressed in: granulocyte; monocyte; ascending aorta / n/a; More reference expression data
BioGPS	More reference expression data
Gene ontology
Molecular function	G protein-coupled receptor activity; odorant binding; olfactory receptor activity; signal transducer activity
Cellular component	integral component of membrane; plasma membrane; membrane
Biological process	sensory perception of smell; signal transduction; response to stimulus; detection of chemical stimulus involved in sensory perception of smell; G protein-coupled receptor signaling pathway
Sources:Amigo / QuickGO
Orthologs
Databases	NCBI: entry; OMA: entry
Species	Human	Mouse
Entrez	79310	258775
Ensembl	ENSG00000197938	ENSMUSG00000096695
UniProt	Q8NGV7	E9PYP4
RefSeq (mRNA)	NM_001005482	NM_146779
RefSeq (protein)	NP_001005482	NP_666990
Location (UCSC)	Chr 3: 98.28 – 98.28 Mb	Chr 16: 58.99 – 58.99 Mb
PubMed search
- Wikidata
View/Edit Human	View/Edit Mouse

Olfactory receptor 5H2 is a protein that in humans is encoded by the OR5H2 gene.

Olfactory receptors interact with odorant molecules in the nose, to initiate a neuronal response that triggers the perception of a smell. The olfactory receptor proteins are members of a large family of G-protein-coupled receptors (GPCR) arising from single coding-exon genes. Olfactory receptors share a 7-transmembrane domain structure with many neurotransmitter and hormone receptors and are responsible for the recognition and G protein-mediated transduction of odorant signals. The olfactory receptor gene family is the largest in the genome. The nomenclature assigned to the olfactory receptor genes and proteins for this organism is independent of other organisms.

== See also ==
- Olfactory receptor
