= OR7G3 =

Protein-coding gene in the species Homo sapiens

Identifiers
- Aliases: OR7G3, OST085, olfactory receptor family 7 subfamily G member 3
- External IDs: MGI: 3030668; GeneCards: OR7G3

Gene location (Human)
Chr.	Chromosome 19 (human)
Band	19p13.2	Start	9,126,012 bp
Band	19p13.2	End	9,126,950 bp

Gene location (Mouse)
Chr.	Chromosome 9 (mouse)
Band	9|9 A2	Start	18,899,286 bp
Band	9|9 A2	End	18,900,224 bp
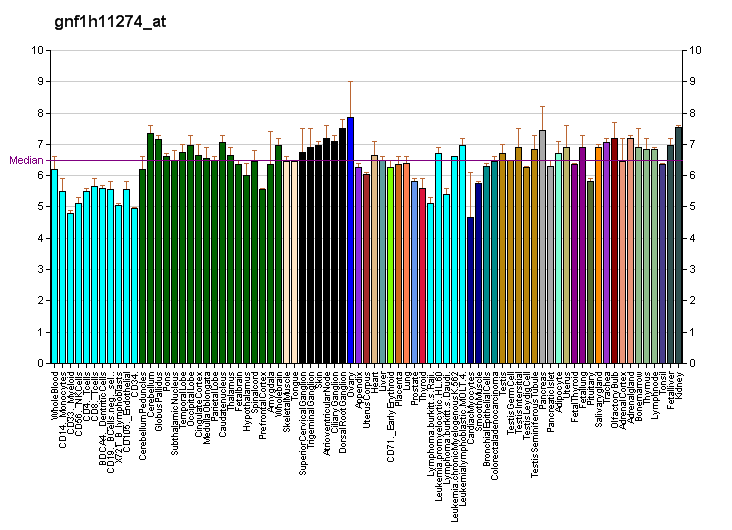

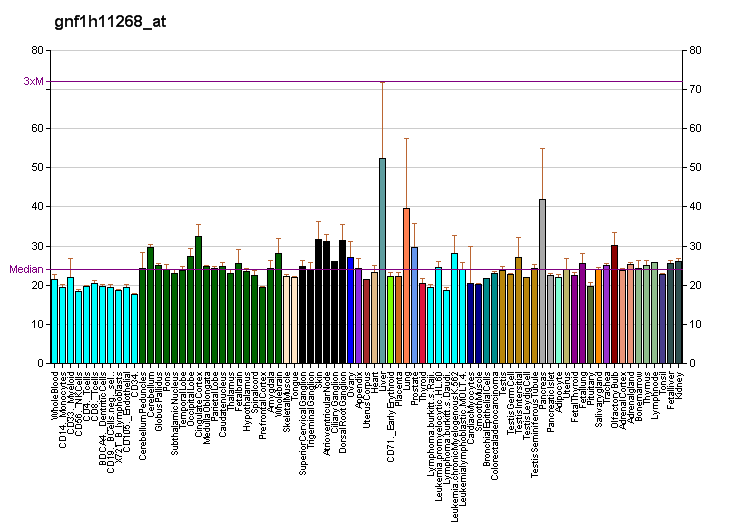

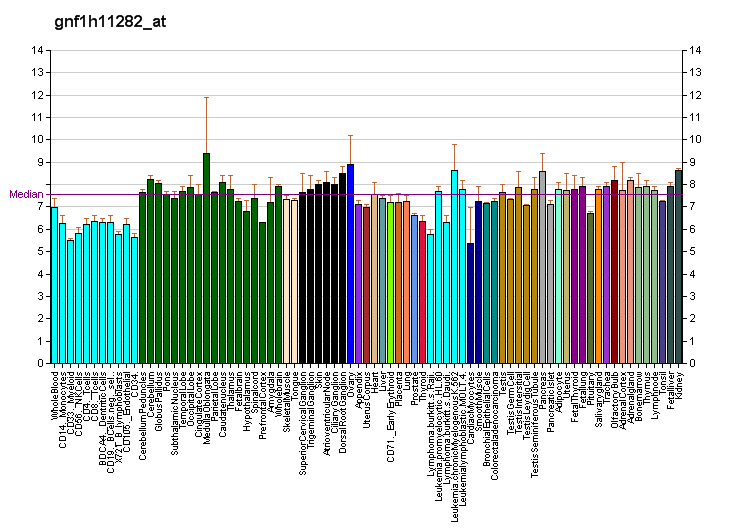
RNA expression pattern
Bgee	Human / Mouse (ortholog); Top expressed in: fallopian tube / n/a; More reference expression data
BioGPS	More reference expression data
Gene ontology
Molecular function	G protein-coupled receptor activity; olfactory receptor activity; signal transducer activity
Cellular component	integral component of membrane; plasma membrane; membrane
Biological process	sensory perception of smell; detection of chemical stimulus involved in sensory perception of smell; signal transduction; response to stimulus; G protein-coupled receptor signaling pathway
Sources:Amigo / QuickGO
Orthologs
Databases	NCBI: entry; OMA: entry
Species	Human	Mouse
Entrez	390883	258074
Ensembl	ENSG00000170920	ENSMUSG00000095525
UniProt	Q8NG95	Q7TRG8
RefSeq (mRNA)	NM_001001958	NM_001011823
RefSeq (protein)	NP_001001958	NP_001011823
Location (UCSC)	Chr 19: 9.13 – 9.13 Mb	Chr 9: 18.9 – 18.9 Mb
PubMed search
- Wikidata
View/Edit Human	View/Edit Mouse

Olfactory receptor 7G3 is a protein that in humans is encoded by the OR7G3 gene.

Olfactory receptors interact with odorant molecules in the nose, to initiate a neuronal response that triggers the perception of a smell. The olfactory receptor proteins are members of a large family of G-protein-coupled receptors (GPCR) arising from single coding-exon genes. Olfactory receptors share a 7-transmembrane domain structure with many neurotransmitter and hormone receptors and are responsible for the recognition and G protein-mediated transduction of odorant signals. The olfactory receptor gene family is the largest in the genome. The nomenclature assigned to the olfactory receptor genes and proteins for this organism is independent of other organisms.

== See also ==
- Olfactory receptor
