= OR51V1 =

Protein-coding gene in the species Homo sapiens

Identifiers
- Aliases: OR51V1, OR11-36, OR51A12, olfactory receptor family 51 subfamily V member 1
- External IDs: GeneCards: OR51V1

Gene location (Human)
Chr.	Chromosome 11 (human)
Band	11p15.4	Start	5,199,735 bp
Band	11p15.4	End	5,200,682 bp
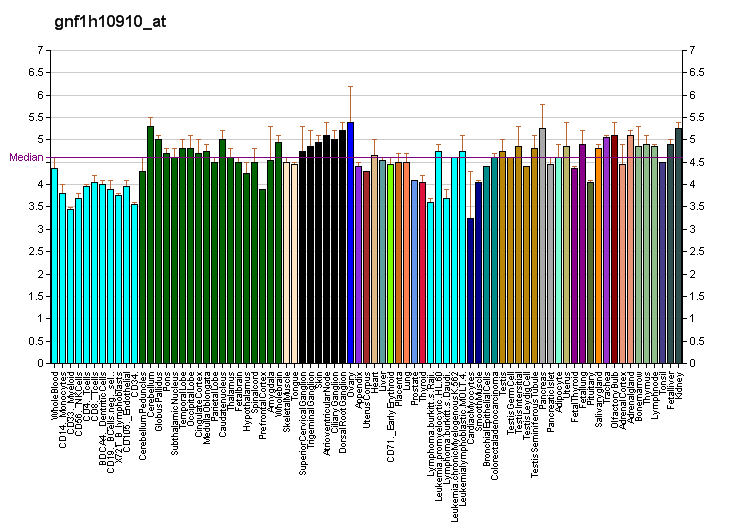

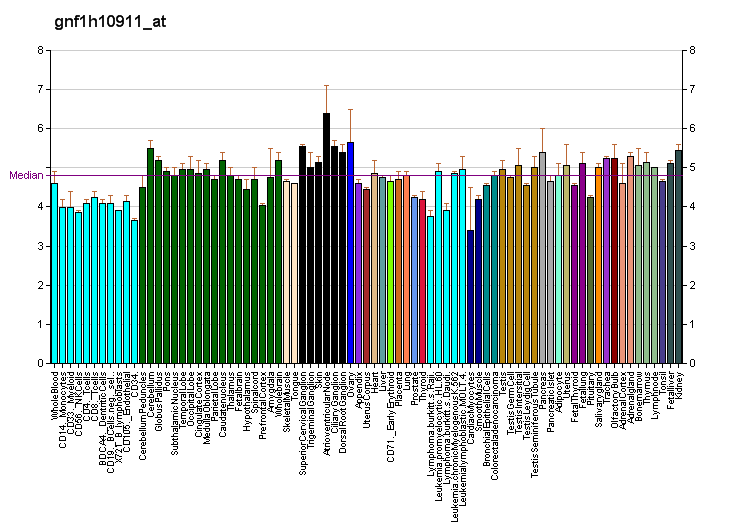

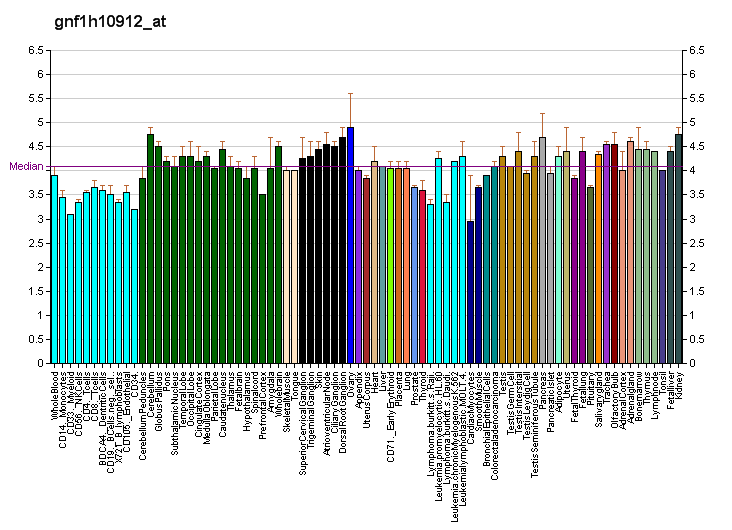
RNA expression pattern
Bgee	Human / Mouse (ortholog); Top expressed in: testicle / n/a; More reference expression data
BioGPS	More reference expression data
Gene ontology
Molecular function	signal transducer activity; olfactory receptor activity; G protein-coupled receptor activity
Cellular component	membrane; integral component of membrane; plasma membrane
Biological process	sensory perception of smell; signal transduction; response to stimulus; detection of chemical stimulus involved in sensory perception of smell; G protein-coupled receptor signaling pathway
Sources:Amigo / QuickGO
Orthologs
Databases	NCBI: entry; OMA: entry
Species	Human	Mouse
Entrez	283111	n/a
Ensembl	ENSG00000176742	n/a
UniProt	Q9H2C8	n/a
RefSeq (mRNA)	NM_001004760	n/a
RefSeq (protein)	NP_001004760	n/a
Location (UCSC)	Chr 11: 5.2 – 5.2 Mb	n/a
PubMed search		n/a
- Wikidata
View/Edit Human

Olfactory receptor 51V1 is a protein that in humans is encoded by the OR51V1 gene.

Olfactory receptors interact with odorant molecules in the nose, to initiate a neuronal response that triggers the perception of a smell. The olfactory receptor proteins are members of a large family of G-protein-coupled receptors (GPCR) arising from single coding-exon genes. Olfactory receptors share a 7-transmembrane domain structure with many neurotransmitter and hormone receptors and are responsible for the recognition and G protein-mediated transduction of odorant signals. The olfactory receptor gene family is the largest in the genome. The nomenclature assigned to the olfactory receptor genes and proteins for this organism is independent of other organisms.

== See also ==
- Olfactory receptor
