= OR13F1 =

Protein-coding gene in the species Homo sapiens

Identifiers
- Aliases: OR13F1, OR9-6, olfactory receptor family 13 subfamily F member 1
- External IDs: MGI: 3030109; GeneCards: OR13F1

Gene location (Human)
Chr.	Chromosome 9 (human)
Band	9q31.1	Start	104,504,263 bp
Band	9q31.1	End	104,505,222 bp
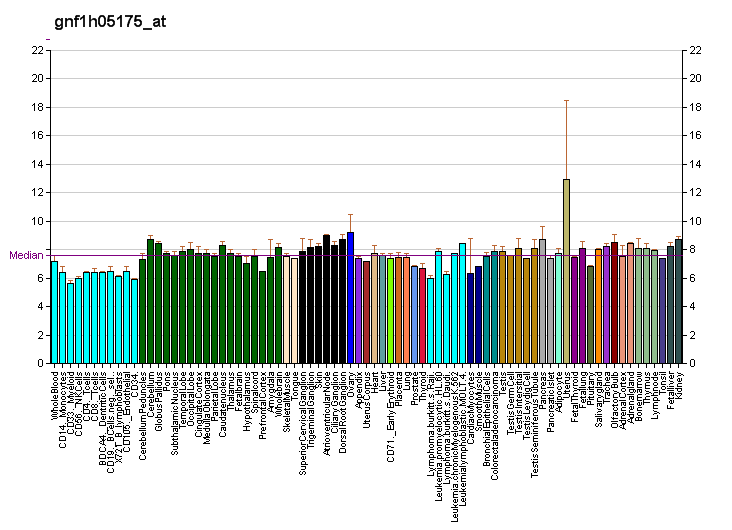

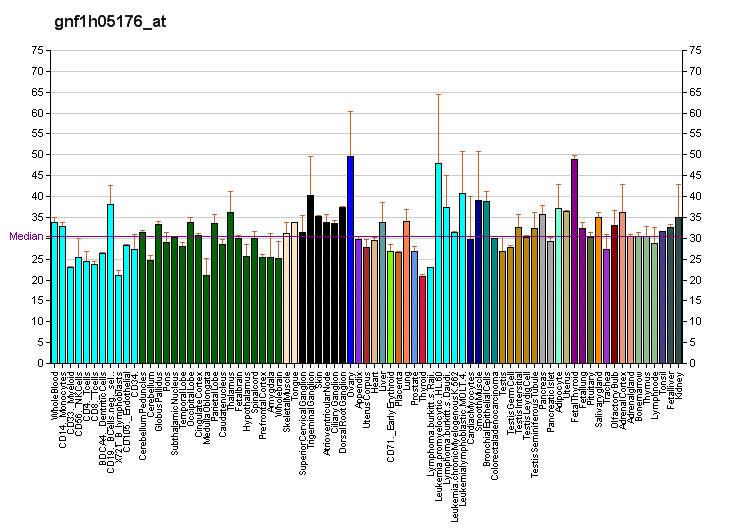
RNA expression pattern
Bgee	Human / Mouse (ortholog); n/a / n/a
BioGPS	More reference expression data
Gene ontology
Molecular function	G protein-coupled receptor activity; olfactory receptor activity; signal transducer activity; adrenergic receptor activity; dopamine neurotransmitter receptor activity, coupled via Gi/Go; dopamine binding
Cellular component	integral component of membrane; plasma membrane; integral component of plasma membrane; membrane; synaptic vesicle membrane; intracellular anatomical structure
Biological process	adenylate cyclase-activating adrenergic receptor signaling pathway; sensory perception of smell; detection of chemical stimulus involved in sensory perception of smell; signal transduction; response to stimulus; synaptic transmission, dopaminergic; negative regulation of adenylate cyclase activity; adenylate cyclase-inhibiting dopamine receptor signaling pathway; response to toxic substance; regulation of dopamine secretion; regulation of potassium ion transport; behavioral response to cocaine; behavioral response to ethanol; negative regulation of cytosolic calcium ion concentration; negative regulation of synaptic transmission, glutamatergic; phospholipase C-activating dopamine receptor signaling pathway; negative regulation of voltage-gated calcium channel activity; G protein-coupled receptor signaling pathway; adrenergic receptor signaling pathway; adenylate cyclase-modulating G protein-coupled receptor signaling pathway
Sources:Amigo / QuickGO
Orthologs
Databases	NCBI: entry; OMA: entry
Species	Human	Mouse
Entrez	138805	258857
Ensembl	ENSG00000186881	ENSMUSG00000089717
UniProt	Q8NGS4	Q7TS18
RefSeq (mRNA)	NM_001004485	NM_146858
RefSeq (protein)	NP_001004485	NP_667069
Location (UCSC)	Chr 9: 104.5 – 104.51 Mb	n/a
PubMed search
- Wikidata
View/Edit Human	View/Edit Mouse

Olfactory receptor 13F1 is a protein that in humans is encoded by the OR13F1 gene.

Olfactory receptors interact with odorant molecules in the nose, to initiate a neuronal response that triggers the perception of a smell. The olfactory receptor proteins are members of a large family of G-protein-coupled receptors (GPCR) arising from single coding-exon genes. Olfactory receptors share a 7-transmembrane domain structure with many neurotransmitter and hormone receptors and are responsible for the recognition and G protein-mediated transduction of odorant signals. The olfactory receptor gene family is the largest in the genome. The nomenclature assigned to the olfactory receptor genes and proteins for this organism is independent of other organisms.

== See also ==
- Olfactory receptor
