= OR10AD1 =

Protein-coding gene in the species Homo sapiens

Identifiers
- Aliases: OR10AD1, OR10AD1P, OR12-1, olfactory receptor family 10 subfamily AD member 1
- External IDs: MGI: 3030122; GeneCards: OR10AD1

Gene location (Human)
Chr.	Chromosome 12 (human)
Band	12q13.11	Start	48,202,339 bp
Band	12q13.11	End	48,203,292 bp

Gene location (Mouse)
Chr.	Chromosome 15 (mouse)
Band	15|15 F1	Start	98,083,894 bp
Band	15|15 F1	End	98,093,423 bp
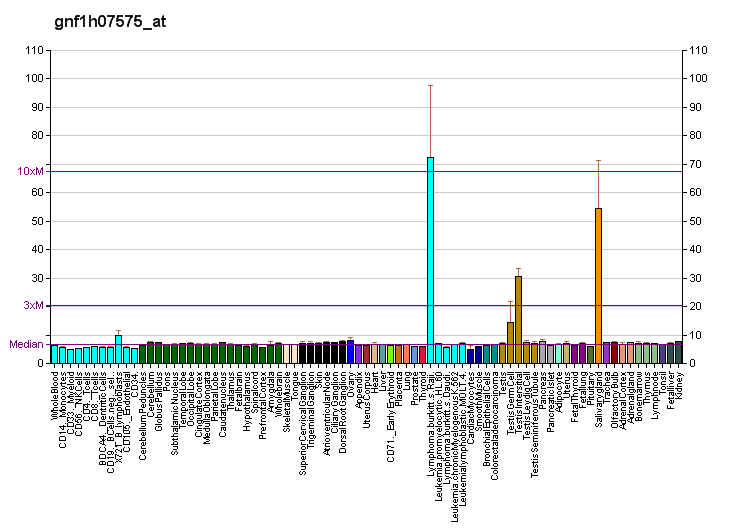

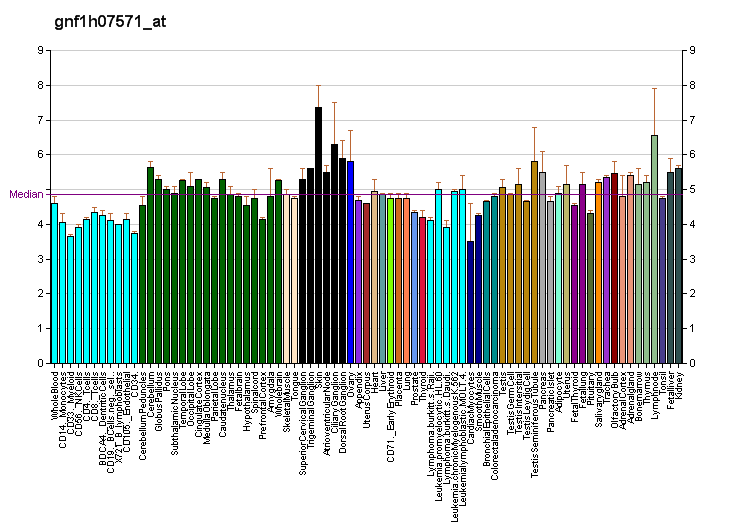
RNA expression pattern
Bgee	Human / Mouse (ortholog); Top expressed in: sural nerve; pituitary gland; granulocyte; right uterine tube; tonsil; anterior pituitary; right adrenal cortex; Achilles tendon; right hemisphere of cerebellum; appendix / Top expressed in: primary oocyte; secondary oocyte; zygote; mandible; respiratory epithelium; peripheral nervous system; nasal epithelium; olfactory epithelium; ovary; cerebellar cortex; More reference expression data
BioGPS	More reference expression data
Gene ontology
Molecular function	G protein-coupled receptor activity; olfactory receptor activity; signal transducer activity
Cellular component	integral component of membrane; plasma membrane; membrane
Biological process	sensory perception of smell; signal transduction; response to stimulus; detection of chemical stimulus involved in sensory perception of smell; G protein-coupled receptor signaling pathway
Sources:Amigo / QuickGO
Orthologs
Databases	NCBI: entry; OMA: entry
Species	Human	Mouse
Entrez	121275	545140
Ensembl	ENSG00000172640	ENSMUSG00000075427
UniProt	Q8NGE0	E9Q1P2
RefSeq (mRNA)	NM_001004134	NM_001011733
RefSeq (protein)	NP_001004134	NP_001011733
Location (UCSC)	Chr 12: 48.2 – 48.2 Mb	Chr 15: 98.08 – 98.09 Mb
PubMed search
- Wikidata
View/Edit Human	View/Edit Mouse

Olfactory receptor 10AD1 is a protein that in humans is encoded by the OR10AD1 gene.

Olfactory receptors interact with odorant molecules in the nose, to initiate a neuronal response that triggers the perception of a smell. The olfactory receptor proteins are members of a large family of G-protein-coupled receptors (GPCR) arising from single coding-exon genes. Olfactory receptors share a 7-transmembrane domain structure with many neurotransmitter and hormone receptors and are responsible for the recognition and G protein-mediated transduction of odorant signals. The olfactory receptor gene family is the largest in the genome. The nomenclature assigned to the olfactory receptor genes and proteins for this organism is independent of other organisms.

== See also ==
- Olfactory receptor
