= OR5K1 =

Protein-coding gene in the species Homo sapiens

Identifiers
- Aliases: OR5K1, HSHTPCRX10, HTPCRX10, OR3-8, olfactory receptor family 5 subfamily K member 1
- External IDs: MGI: 3030006; GeneCards: OR5K1

Gene location (Human)
| Chr. | Chromosome 3 (human) |
| Band | 3q11.2 | Start | 98,463,201 bp |
| Band | 3q11.2 | End | 98,472,924 bp |

Gene location (Mouse)
| Chr. | Chromosome 16 (mouse) |
| Band | 16|16 C1.2 | Start | 58,579,907 bp |
| Band | 16|16 C1.2 | End | 58,583,539 bp |
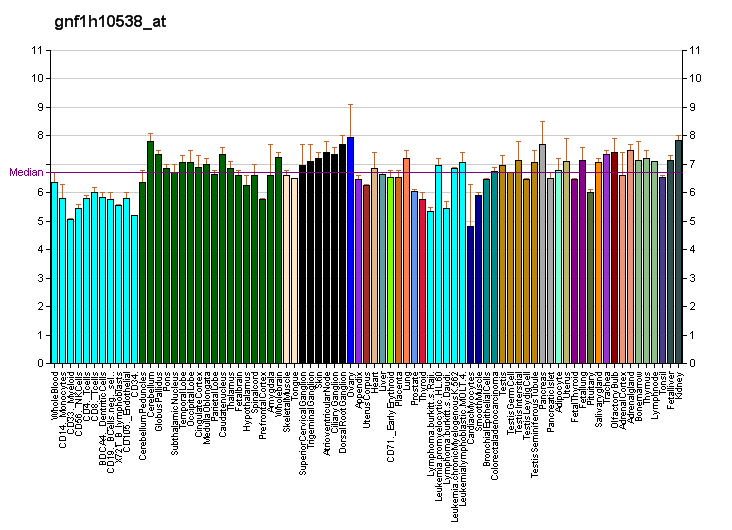

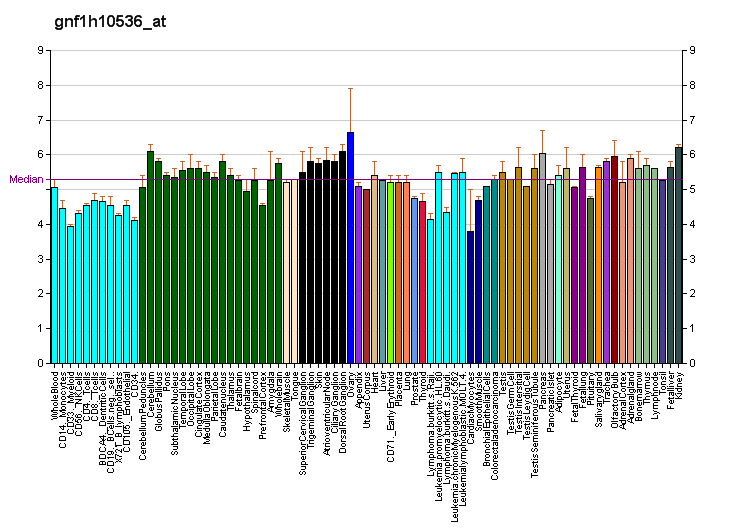
RNA expression pattern
| Bgee | Human / Mouse (ortholog); Top expressed in: Achilles tendon; skin of hip; muscle of thigh; apex of heart; ventricle of the heart; left ventricle; smooth muscle tissue / n/a; More reference expression data |
| BioGPS | More reference expression data |
Gene ontology
| Molecular function | G protein-coupled receptor activity; odorant binding; olfactory receptor activity; signal transducer activity |
| Cellular component | integral component of membrane; plasma membrane; membrane |
| Biological process | sensory perception of smell; signal transduction; response to stimulus; detection of chemical stimulus involved in sensory perception of smell; G protein-coupled receptor signaling pathway |
Sources:Amigo / QuickGO
Orthologs
| Databases | NCBI: entry; OMA: entry |
| Species | Human | Mouse |
| Entrez | 26339 | 259003 |
| Ensembl | ENSG00000232382 | ENSMUSG00000071510 |
| UniProt | Q8NHB7 | E9Q8F6 |
| RefSeq (mRNA) | NM_001004736 | NM_147001 |
| RefSeq (protein) | NP_001004736 | NP_667212 |
| Location (UCSC) | Chr 3: 98.46 – 98.47 Mb | Chr 16: 58.58 – 58.58 Mb |
| PubMed search |
- Wikidata
| View/Edit Human | View/Edit Mouse |

Olfactory receptor 5K1 is a protein that in humans is encoded by the OR5K1 gene.

Olfactory receptors interact with odorant molecules in the nose, to initiate a neuronal response that triggers the perception of a smell. The olfactory receptor proteins are members of a large family of G-protein-coupled receptors (GPCR) arising from single coding-exon genes. Olfactory receptors share a 7-transmembrane domain structure with many neurotransmitter and hormone receptors and are responsible for the recognition and G protein-mediated transduction of odorant signals. The olfactory receptor gene family is the largest in the genome. The nomenclature assigned to the olfactory receptor genes and proteins for this organism is independent of other organisms.

== See also ==
- Olfactory receptor
