= OR5AU1 =

Protein-coding gene in the species Homo sapiens

Identifiers
- Aliases: OR5AU1, olfactory receptor, family 5, subfamily AU, member 1, OR14-38, olfactory receptor family 5 subfamily AU member 1
- External IDs: MGI: 3030055; GeneCards: OR5AU1

Gene location (Human)
Chr.	Chromosome 14 (human)
Band	14q11.2	Start	21,148,370 bp
Band	14q11.2	End	21,159,060 bp

Gene location (Mouse)
Chr.	Chromosome 14 (mouse)
Band	14|14 C2	Start	52,271,419 bp
Band	14|14 C2	End	52,279,916 bp
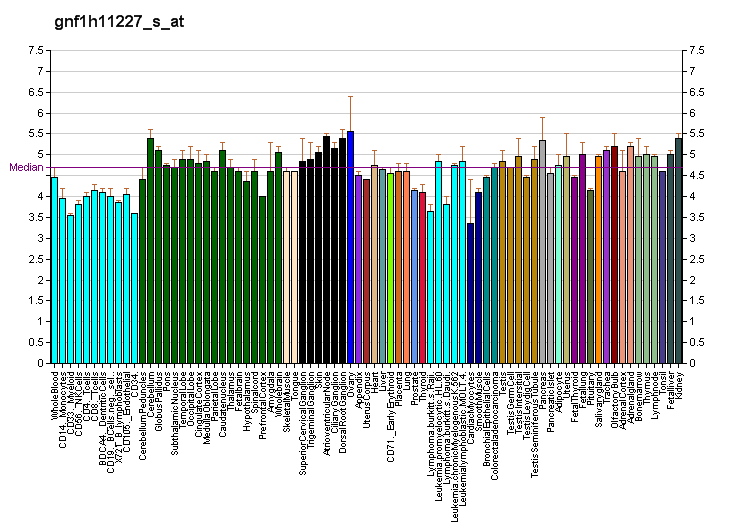

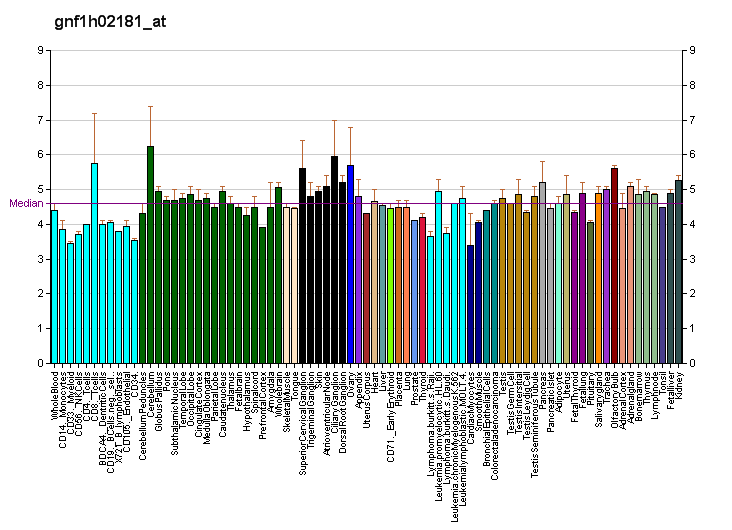
RNA expression pattern
Bgee	Human / Mouse (ortholog); Top expressed in: blood; olfactory zone of nasal mucosa / Top expressed in: zygote; secondary oocyte; primary oocyte; embryo; blastocyst; More reference expression data
BioGPS	More reference expression data
Gene ontology
Molecular function	G protein-coupled receptor activity; odorant binding; olfactory receptor activity; signal transducer activity
Cellular component	integral component of membrane; plasma membrane; membrane
Biological process	sensory perception of smell; signal transduction; response to stimulus; detection of chemical stimulus involved in sensory perception of smell; G protein-coupled receptor signaling pathway
Sources:Amigo / QuickGO
Orthologs
Databases	NCBI: entry; OMA: entry
Species	Human	Mouse
Entrez	390445	258420
Ensembl	ENSG00000169327	ENSMUSG00000044286
UniProt	Q8NGC0	B2RVX8
RefSeq (mRNA)	NM_001004731	NM_001001808; NM_146428
RefSeq (protein)	NP_001004731	NP_001001808
Location (UCSC)	Chr 14: 21.15 – 21.16 Mb	Chr 14: 52.27 – 52.28 Mb
PubMed search
- Wikidata
View/Edit Human	View/Edit Mouse

Olfactory receptor 5AU1 is a protein that in humans is encoded by the OR5AU1 gene.

== Function ==
Olfactory receptors interact with odorant molecules in the nose, to initiate a neuronal response that triggers the perception of a smell. The olfactory receptor proteins are members of a large family of G-protein-coupled receptors (GPCR) arising from single coding-exon genes. Olfactory receptors share a 7-transmembrane domain structure with many neurotransmitter and hormone receptors and are responsible for the recognition and G protein-mediated transduction of odorant signals. The olfactory receptor gene family is the largest in the genome. The nomenclature assigned to the olfactory receptor genes and proteins for this organism is independent of other organisms.

== See also ==
- Olfactory receptor
