= OR5AR1 =

Protein-coding gene in the species Homo sapiens

Identifiers
- Aliases: OR5AR1, OR11-209, olfactory receptor family 5 subfamily AR member 1 (gene/pseudogene), olfactory receptor family 5 subfamily AR member 1
- External IDs: MGI: 3030853; GeneCards: OR5AR1

Gene location (Human)
Chr.	Chromosome 11 (human)
Band	11q12.1	Start	56,663,686 bp
Band	11q12.1	End	56,664,618 bp

Gene location (Mouse)
Chr.	Chromosome 2 (mouse)
Band	2|2 D	Start	85,669,965 bp
Band	2|2 D	End	85,675,827 bp
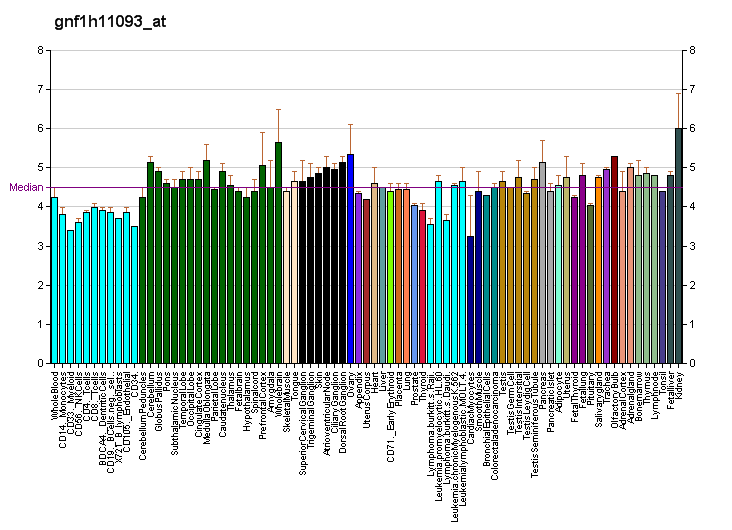

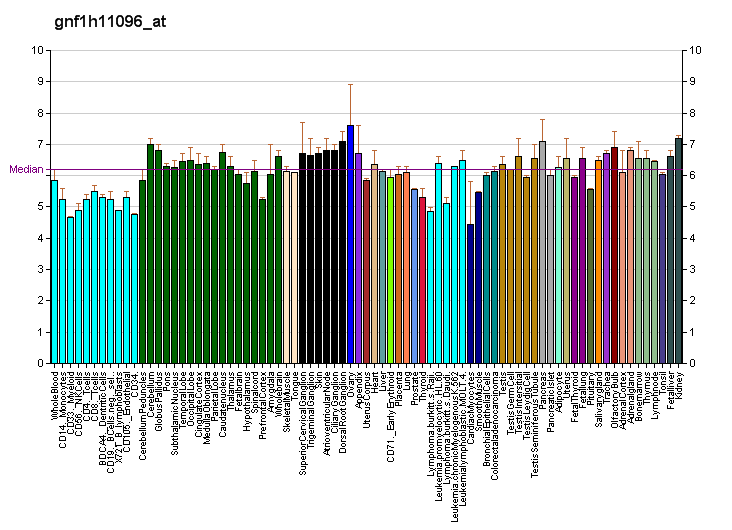
RNA expression pattern
Bgee	Human / Mouse (ortholog); Top expressed in: blood; multicellular organism / n/a; More reference expression data
BioGPS	More reference expression data
Gene ontology
Molecular function	G protein-coupled receptor activity; signal transducer activity; olfactory receptor activity; odorant binding; copper ion binding
Cellular component	integral component of membrane; plasma membrane; membrane; integral component of plasma membrane
Biological process	response to stimulus; signal transduction; sensory perception of smell; detection of chemical stimulus involved in sensory perception of smell; G protein-coupled receptor signaling pathway; detection of chemical stimulus involved in sensory perception
Sources:Amigo / QuickGO
Orthologs
Databases	NCBI: entry; OMA: entry
Species	Human	Mouse
Entrez	219493	259017
Ensembl	ENSG00000172459	ENSMUSG00000075208
UniProt	Q8NGP9	Q8VGS3
RefSeq (mRNA)	NM_001004730	NM_147015
RefSeq (protein)	NP_001004730	NP_667226
Location (UCSC)	Chr 11: 56.66 – 56.66 Mb	Chr 2: 85.67 – 85.68 Mb
PubMed search
- Wikidata
View/Edit Human	View/Edit Mouse

Olfactory receptor 5AR1 is a protein that in humans is encoded by the OR5AR1 gene.

Olfactory receptors interact with odorant molecules in the nose, to initiate a neuronal response that triggers the perception of a smell. The olfactory receptor proteins are members of a large family of G-protein-coupled receptors (GPCR) arising from single coding-exon genes. Olfactory receptors share a 7-transmembrane domain structure with many neurotransmitter and hormone receptors and are responsible for the recognition and G protein-mediated transduction of odorant signals. The olfactory receptor gene family is the largest in the genome. The nomenclature assigned to the olfactory receptor genes and proteins for this organism is independent of other organisms.

== See also ==
- Olfactory receptor
