= OR56B4 =

Protein-coding gene in the species Homo sapiens

Identifiers
- Aliases: OR56B4, OR11-67, olfactory receptor family 56 subfamily B member 4
- External IDs: MGI: 3030497; GeneCards: OR56B4

Gene location (Human)
Chr.	Chromosome 11 (human)
Band	11p15.4	Start	6,107,684 bp
Band	11p15.4	End	6,108,835 bp

Gene location (Mouse)
Chr.	Chromosome 7 (mouse)
Band	7|7 E3	Start	104,352,776 bp
Band	7|7 E3	End	104,353,734 bp
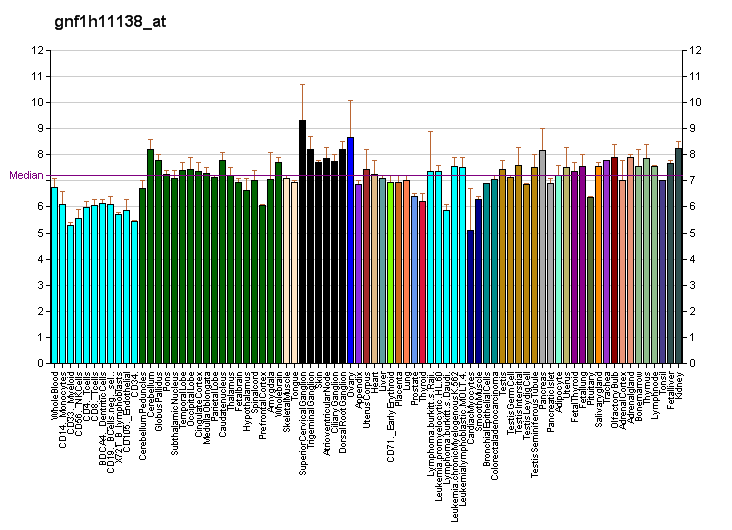

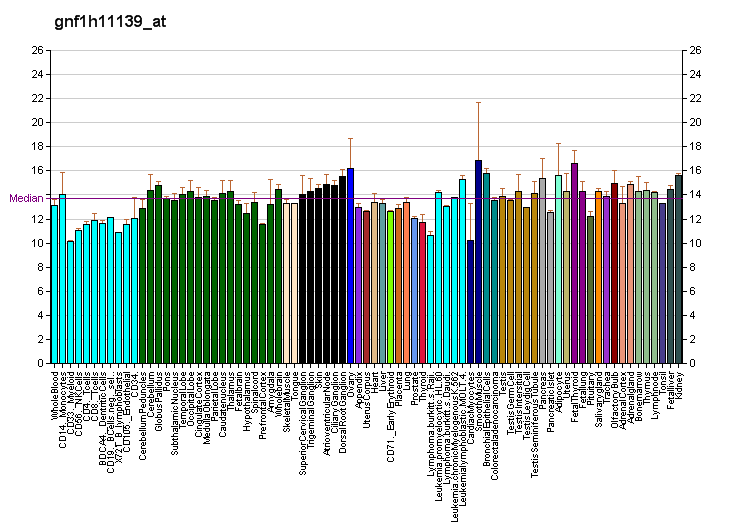
RNA expression pattern
Bgee	Human / Mouse (ortholog); Top expressed in: gonad; smooth muscle tissue; mucosa of transverse colon; monocyte; rectum; appendix; islet of Langerhans; duodenum; right coronary artery; salivary gland / n/a; More reference expression data
BioGPS	More reference expression data
Gene ontology
Molecular function	G protein-coupled receptor activity; olfactory receptor activity; signal transducer activity
Cellular component	integral component of membrane; plasma membrane; membrane
Biological process	sensory perception of smell; signal transduction; response to stimulus; detection of chemical stimulus involved in sensory perception of smell; G protein-coupled receptor signaling pathway
Sources:Amigo / QuickGO
Orthologs
Databases	NCBI: entry; OMA: entry
Species	Human	Mouse
Entrez	196335	257914
Ensembl	ENSG00000180919	ENSMUSG00000109806
UniProt	Q8NH76	Q7TRP6
RefSeq (mRNA)	NM_001005181	NM_001011757
RefSeq (protein)	NP_001005181	NP_001011757
Location (UCSC)	Chr 11: 6.11 – 6.11 Mb	Chr 7: 104.35 – 104.35 Mb
PubMed search
- Wikidata
View/Edit Human	View/Edit Mouse

Olfactory receptor 56B4 is a protein that in humans is encoded by the OR56B4 gene.

Olfactory receptors interact with odorant molecules in the nose, to initiate a neuronal response that triggers the perception of a smell. The olfactory receptor proteins are members of a large family of G-protein-coupled receptors (GPCR) arising from single coding-exon genes. Olfactory receptors share a 7-transmembrane domain structure with many neurotransmitter and hormone receptors and are responsible for the recognition and G protein-mediated transduction of odorant signals. The olfactory receptor gene family is the largest in the genome. The nomenclature assigned to the olfactory receptor genes and proteins for this organism is independent of other organisms.
