= OR9K2 =

Protein-coding gene in the species Homo sapiens

Identifiers
- Aliases: OR9K2, OR12-2, olfactory receptor family 9 subfamily K member 2
- External IDs: MGI: 3030659; GeneCards: OR9K2

Gene location (Human)
Chr.	Chromosome 12 (human)
Band	12q13.2	Start	55,126,406 bp
Band	12q13.2	End	55,132,750 bp

Gene location (Mouse)
Chr.	Chromosome 10 (mouse)
Band	10|10 D3	Start	129,995,601 bp
Band	10|10 D3	End	130,002,635 bp
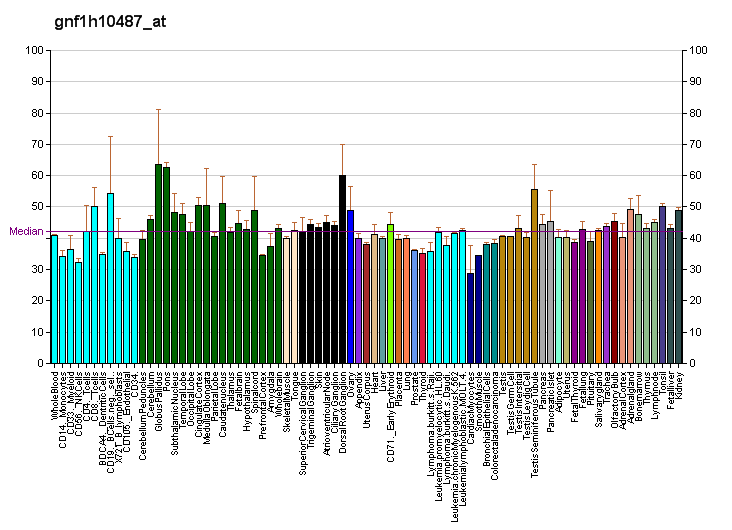

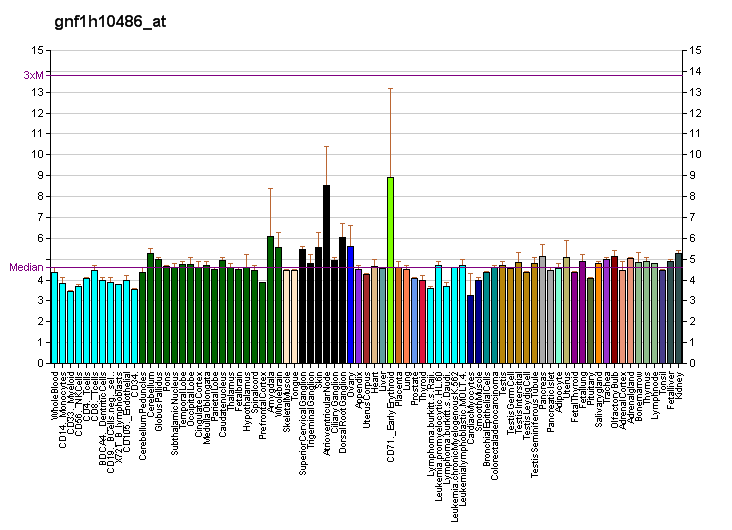
RNA expression pattern
Bgee	Human / Mouse (ortholog); Top expressed in: testicle; gonad; ganglionic eminence; muscle of thigh; cell; myeloid leukocyte; monocyte / n/a; More reference expression data
BioGPS	More reference expression data
Gene ontology
Molecular function	G protein-coupled receptor activity; odorant binding; olfactory receptor activity; signal transducer activity
Cellular component	integral component of membrane; plasma membrane; membrane
Biological process	sensory perception of smell; signal transduction; response to stimulus; detection of chemical stimulus involved in sensory perception of smell; G protein-coupled receptor signaling pathway
Sources:Amigo / QuickGO
Orthologs
Databases	NCBI: entry; OMA: entry
Species	Human	Mouse
Entrez	441639	258672
Ensembl	ENSG00000170605	ENSMUSG00000058084
UniProt	Q8NGE7	Q8VFU7
RefSeq (mRNA)	NM_001005243	NM_146677
RefSeq (protein)	NP_001005243	NP_666888
Location (UCSC)	Chr 12: 55.13 – 55.13 Mb	Chr 10: 130 – 130 Mb
PubMed search
- Wikidata
View/Edit Human	View/Edit Mouse

Olfactory receptor 9K2 is a protein that in humans is encoded by the OR9K2 gene.

Olfactory receptors interact with odorant molecules in the nose, to initiate a neuronal response that triggers the perception of a smell. The olfactory receptor proteins are members of a large family of G-protein-coupled receptors (GPCR) arising from single coding-exon genes. Olfactory receptors share a 7-transmembrane domain structure with many neurotransmitter and hormone receptors and are responsible for the recognition and G protein-mediated transduction of odorant signals. The olfactory receptor gene family is the largest in the genome. The nomenclature assigned to the olfactory receptor genes and proteins for this organism is independent of other organisms.

== See also ==
- Olfactory receptor
