= OR9G4 =

Protein-coding gene in the species Homo sapiens

Identifiers
- Aliases: OR9G4, OR11-216, olfactory receptor family 9 subfamily G member 4
- External IDs: MGI: 3030840; GeneCards: OR9G4

Gene location (Human)
Chr.	Chromosome 11 (human)
Band	11q12.1	Start	56,741,223 bp
Band	11q12.1	End	56,748,697 bp

Gene location (Mouse)
Chr.	Chromosome 2 (mouse)
Band	2|2 D	Start	85,504,001 bp
Band	2|2 D	End	85,509,111 bp
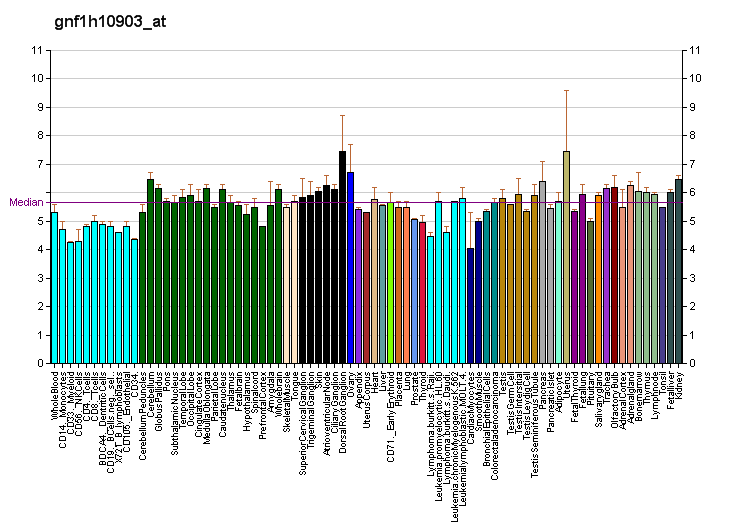

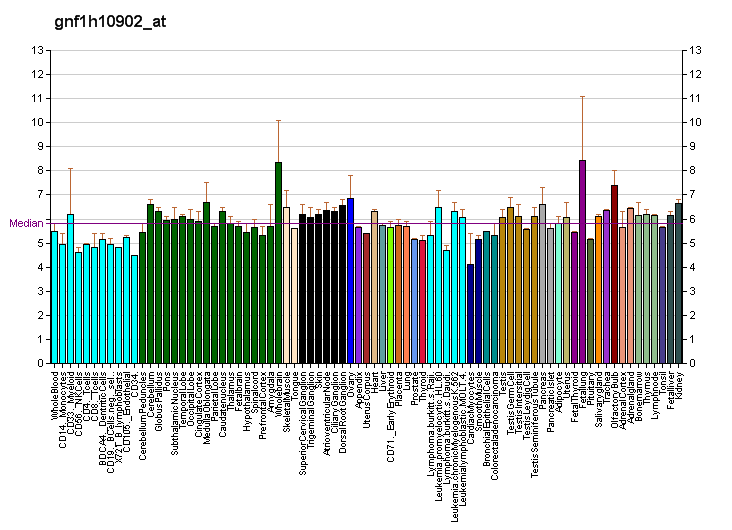
RNA expression pattern
Bgee	Human / Mouse (ortholog); Top expressed in: salivary gland; minor salivary glands; multicellular organism / n/a; More reference expression data
BioGPS	More reference expression data
Gene ontology
Molecular function	G protein-coupled receptor activity; odorant binding; olfactory receptor activity; signal transducer activity
Cellular component	integral component of membrane; plasma membrane; membrane
Biological process	sensory perception of smell; signal transduction; response to stimulus; detection of chemical stimulus involved in sensory perception of smell; G protein-coupled receptor signaling pathway
Sources:Amigo / QuickGO
Orthologs
Databases	NCBI: entry; OMA: entry
Species	Human	Mouse
Entrez	283189	258563
Ensembl	ENSG00000262647; ENSG00000172457	ENSMUSG00000075211
UniProt	Q8NGQ1	A2ALD2
RefSeq (mRNA)	NM_001005284; NM_001390832	NM_146570
RefSeq (protein)	NP_001005284	NP_666781
Location (UCSC)	Chr 11: 56.74 – 56.75 Mb	Chr 2: 85.5 – 85.51 Mb
PubMed search
- Wikidata
View/Edit Human	View/Edit Mouse

Olfactory receptor 9G4 is a protein that in humans is encoded by the OR9G4 gene.

Olfactory receptors interact with odorant molecules in the nose, to initiate a neuronal response that triggers the perception of a smell. The olfactory receptor proteins are members of a large family of G-protein-coupled receptors (GPCR) arising from single coding-exon genes. Olfactory receptors share a 7-transmembrane domain structure with many neurotransmitter and hormone receptors and are responsible for the recognition and G protein-mediated transduction of odorant signals. The olfactory receptor gene family is the largest in the genome. The nomenclature assigned to the olfactory receptor genes and proteins for this organism is independent of other organisms.

== See also ==
- Olfactory receptor
