= OR6S1 =

Protein-coding gene in the species Homo sapiens

Identifiers
- Aliases: OR6S1, OR14-37, OR6S1Q, olfactory receptor family 6 subfamily S member 1
- External IDs: MGI: 3030584; GeneCards: OR6S1

Gene location (Human)
Chr.	Chromosome 14 (human)
Band	14q11.2	Start	20,640,696 bp
Band	14q11.2	End	20,641,691 bp

Gene location (Mouse)
Chr.	Chromosome 14 (mouse)
Band	14|14 C1	Start	51,303,758 bp
Band	14|14 C1	End	51,311,892 bp
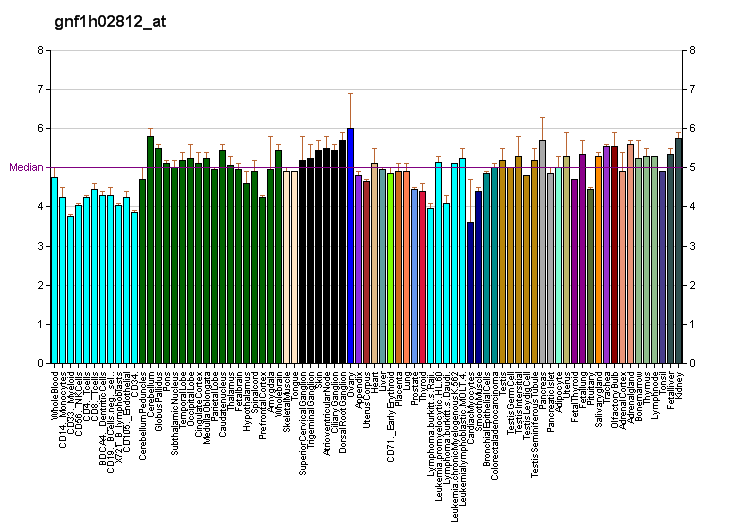

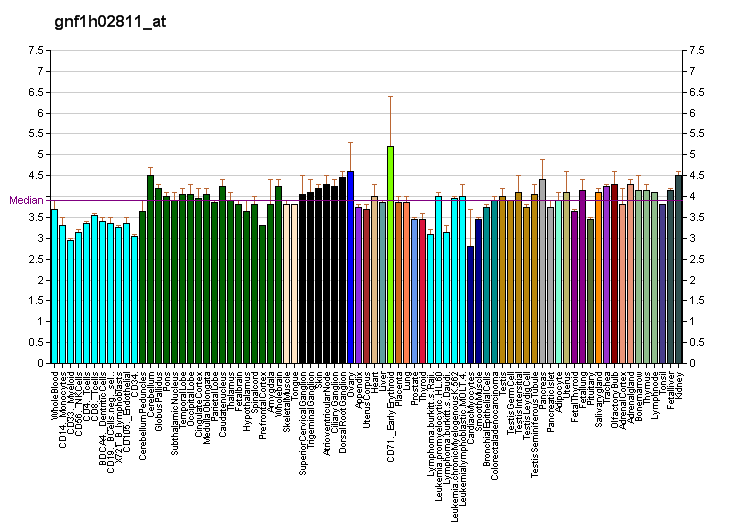
RNA expression pattern
Bgee	Human / Mouse (ortholog); Top expressed in: lymph node; urinary bladder / Top expressed in: lung; More reference expression data
BioGPS	More reference expression data
Gene ontology
Molecular function	G protein-coupled receptor activity; olfactory receptor activity; signal transducer activity
Cellular component	integral component of membrane; plasma membrane; membrane
Biological process	sensory perception of smell; detection of chemical stimulus involved in sensory perception of smell; signal transduction; response to stimulus; G protein-coupled receptor signaling pathway
Sources:Amigo / QuickGO
Orthologs
Databases	NCBI: entry; OMA: entry
Species	Human	Mouse
Entrez	341799	404319
Ensembl	ENSG00000181803	ENSMUSG00000035932
UniProt	Q8NH40	E9Q0Z1
RefSeq (mRNA)	NM_001001968	NM_207558
RefSeq (protein)	NP_001001968	NP_997441
Location (UCSC)	Chr 14: 20.64 – 20.64 Mb	Chr 14: 51.3 – 51.31 Mb
PubMed search
- Wikidata
View/Edit Human	View/Edit Mouse

Olfactory receptor 6S1 is a protein that in humans is encoded by the OR6S1 gene.

Olfactory receptors interact with odorant molecules in the nose, to initiate a neuronal response that triggers the perception of a smell. The olfactory receptor proteins are members of a large family of G-protein-coupled receptors (GPCR) arising from single coding-exon genes. Olfactory receptors share a 7-transmembrane domain structure with many neurotransmitter and hormone receptors and are responsible for the recognition and G protein-mediated transduction of odorant signals. The olfactory receptor gene family is the largest in the genome. The nomenclature assigned to the olfactory receptor genes and proteins for this organism is independent of other organisms.

== See also ==
- Olfactory receptor
