= OR10G2 =

Protein-coding gene in the species Homo sapiens

Identifiers
- Aliases: OR10G2, OR14-41, olfactory receptor family 10 subfamily G member 2
- External IDs: MGI: 3031345; GeneCards: OR10G2

Gene location (Human)
Chr.	Chromosome 14 (human)
Band	14q11.2	Start	21,633,836 bp
Band	14q11.2	End	21,634,940 bp

Gene location (Mouse)
Chr.	Chromosome 14 (mouse)
Band	14|14 C2	Start	52,627,251 bp
Band	14|14 C2	End	52,634,836 bp
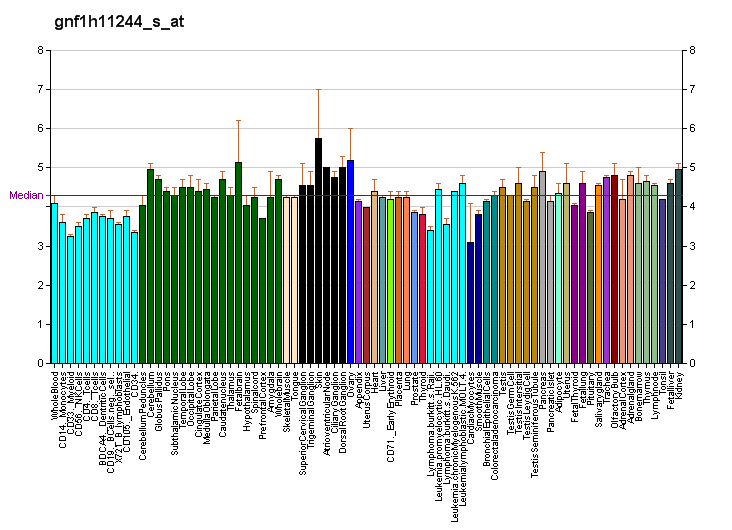

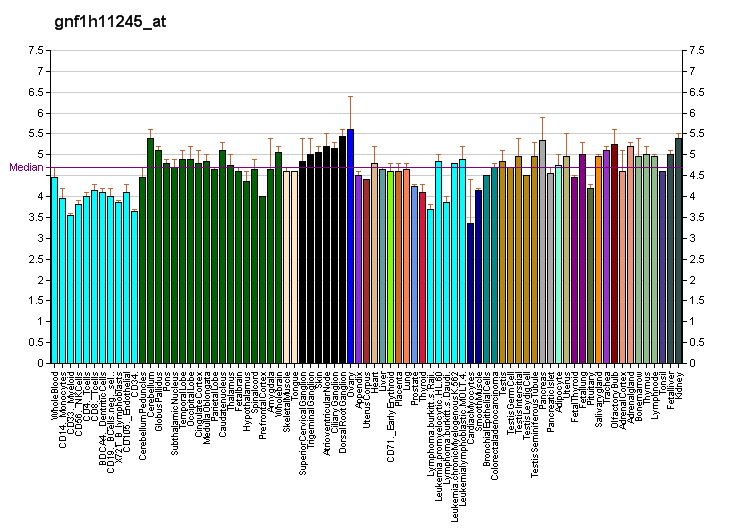
RNA expression pattern
Bgee	Human / Mouse (ortholog); Top expressed in: lymph node; appendix; spleen / Top expressed in: blastocyst; hypothalamus; neural tube; olfactory bulb; More reference expression data
BioGPS	More reference expression data
Orthologs
Databases	NCBI: entry; OMA: entry
Species	Human	Mouse
Entrez	26534	258268
Ensembl	ENSG00000255582	ENSMUSG00000063867
UniProt	n a	E9PWU0
RefSeq (mRNA)	NM_001005466	NM_146271
RefSeq (protein)	n/a	NP_666383
Location (UCSC)	Chr 14: 21.63 – 21.63 Mb	Chr 14: 52.63 – 52.63 Mb
PubMed search
- Wikidata
View/Edit Human	View/Edit Mouse

Olfactory receptor 10G2 is a protein that in humans is encoded by the OR10G2 gene.

Olfactory receptors interact with odorant molecules in the nose, to initiate a neuronal response that triggers the perception of a smell. The olfactory receptor proteins are members of a large family of G-protein-coupled receptors (GPCR) arising from single coding-exon genes. Olfactory receptors share a 7-transmembrane domain structure with many neurotransmitter and hormone receptors and are responsible for the recognition and G protein-mediated transduction of odorant signals. The olfactory receptor gene family is the largest in the genome. The nomenclature assigned to the olfactory receptor genes and proteins for this organism is independent of other organisms.

== See also ==
- Olfactory receptor
