= PTPN23 =

Protein-coding gene in the species Homo sapiens

Identifiers
- Aliases: PTPN23, HD-PTP, HDPTP, PTP-TD14, protein tyrosine phosphatase, non-receptor type 23, protein tyrosine phosphatase non-receptor type 23, NEDBASS
- External IDs: OMIM: 606584; MGI: 2144837; GeneCards: PTPN23
Available structures
PDB	Ortholog search: PDBe RCSB
PDB	List of PDB id codes 3RAU, 5CRV, 5CRU
Enzyme activity
EC #	BRENDA	ExPASy	KEGG	MetaCyc
3.1.3.48	↗	↗	↗	↗

Gene location (Human)
Chr.	Chromosome 3 (human)
Band	3p21.31	Start	47,381,011 bp
Band	3p21.31	End	47,413,435 bp

Gene location (Mouse)
Chr.	Chromosome 9 (mouse)
Band	9|9 F2	Start	110,214,150 bp
Band	9|9 F2	End	110,237,281 bp
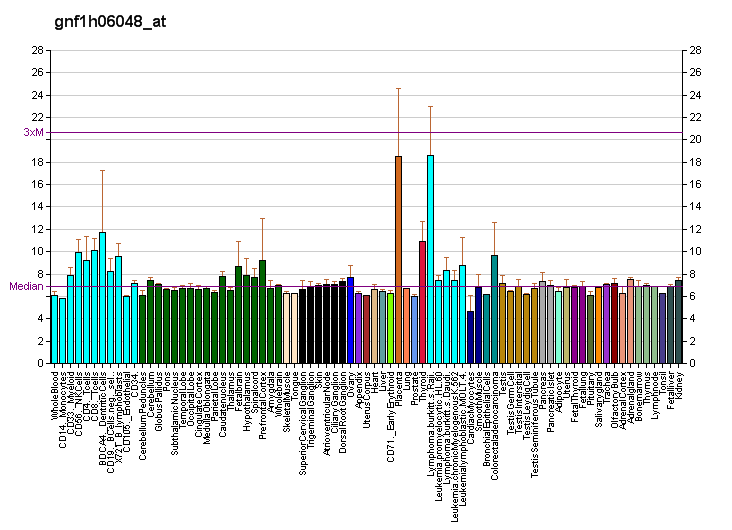
RNA expression pattern
Bgee	Human / Mouse (ortholog); Top expressed in: sural nerve; pituitary gland; skin of arm; anterior pituitary; right hemisphere of cerebellum; right lobe of thyroid gland; stromal cell of endometrium; left lobe of thyroid gland; gastrocnemius muscle; canal of the cervix / Top expressed in: internal carotid artery; ventricular zone; external carotid artery; yolk sac; granulocyte; neural layer of retina; superior frontal gyrus; tail of embryo; primary visual cortex; genital tubercle; More reference expression data
BioGPS	More reference expression data
Gene ontology
Molecular function	phosphoprotein phosphatase activity; phosphatase activity; protein binding; protein tyrosine phosphatase activity; protein kinase binding; hydrolase activity
Cellular component	cytoplasm; ciliary basal body; endosome; cell projection; cilium; nucleoplasm; early endosome; extracellular exosome; cytoskeleton; cytoplasmic vesicle; nucleus; nuclear body; cytosol
Biological process	positive regulation of homophilic cell adhesion; cilium assembly; regulation of cell migration; protein dephosphorylation; positive regulation of adherens junction organization; cell projection organization; protein transport; positive regulation of early endosome to late endosome transport; ubiquitin-dependent protein catabolic process via the multivesicular body sorting pathway; negative regulation of epithelial cell migration; dephosphorylation; peptidyl-tyrosine dephosphorylation; early endosome to late endosome transport; positive regulation of Wnt protein secretion; transport; endocytic recycling; cellular response to cytokine stimulus
Sources:Amigo / QuickGO
Orthologs
Databases	NCBI: entry; OMA: entry
Species	Human	Mouse
Entrez	25930	104831
Ensembl	ENSG00000076201	ENSMUSG00000036057
UniProt	Q9H3S7	Q6PB44
RefSeq (mRNA)	NM_001304482; NM_015466	NM_001081043
RefSeq (protein)	NP_001291411; NP_056281	NP_001074512
Location (UCSC)	Chr 3: 47.38 – 47.41 Mb	Chr 9: 110.21 – 110.24 Mb
PubMed search
- Wikidata
View/Edit Human	View/Edit Mouse

Tyrosine-protein phosphatase non-receptor type 23 is an enzyme that in humans is encoded by the PTPN23 gene.
