= OR10K1 =

Protein-coding gene in humans

Identifiers
- Aliases: OR10K1, OR1-6, olfactory receptor family 10 subfamily K member 1
- External IDs: GeneCards: OR10K1

Gene location (Human)
Chr.	Chromosome 1 (human)
Band	1q23.1	Start	158,461,574 bp
Band	1q23.1	End	158,470,857 bp
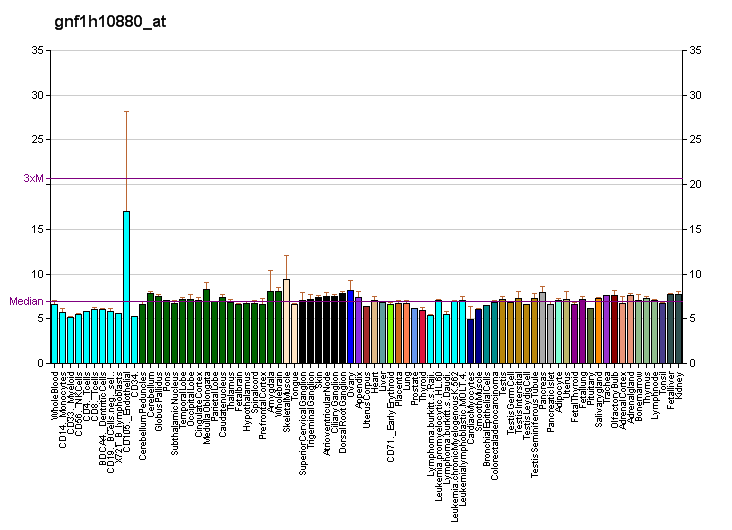
RNA expression pattern
Bgee	Human / Mouse (ortholog); Top expressed in: gonad; testicle; Achilles tendon; blood; heart; cerebral cortex; dorsolateral prefrontal cortex / n/a; More reference expression data
BioGPS	More reference expression data
Gene ontology
Molecular function	G protein-coupled receptor activity; olfactory receptor activity; transmembrane signaling receptor activity; signal transducer activity
Cellular component	integral component of membrane; plasma membrane; membrane
Biological process	sensory perception of smell; detection of chemical stimulus involved in sensory perception of smell; detection of chemical stimulus involved in sensory perception; signal transduction; response to stimulus; G protein-coupled receptor signaling pathway
Sources:Amigo / QuickGO
Orthologs
Databases	NCBI: entry; OMA: entry
Species	Human	Mouse
Entrez	391109	n/a
Ensembl	ENSG00000173285	n/a
UniProt	Q8NGX5	n/a
RefSeq (mRNA)	NM_001004473	n/a
RefSeq (protein)	NP_001004473	n/a
Location (UCSC)	Chr 1: 158.46 – 158.47 Mb	n/a
PubMed search		n/a
- Wikidata
View/Edit Human

Olfactory receptor 10K1 is a protein that in humans is encoded by the OR10K1 gene.

Olfactory receptors interact with odorant molecules in the nose, to initiate a neuronal response that triggers the perception of a smell. The olfactory receptor proteins are members of a large family of G-protein-coupled receptors (GPCR) arising from single coding-exon genes. Olfactory receptors share a 7-transmembrane domain structure with many neurotransmitter and hormone receptors and are responsible for the recognition and G protein-mediated transduction of odorant signals. The olfactory receptor gene family is the largest in the genome. The nomenclature assigned to the olfactory receptor genes and proteins for this organism is independent of other organisms.

== Amino acid sequence ==
MEQVNKTVVR EFVVLGFSSL ARLQQLLFVI FLLLYLFTLG TNAIIISTIV LDRALHTPMY FFLAILSCSE ICYTFVIVPK MLVDLLSQKK TISFLGCAIQ MFSFLFFGSS HSFLLAAMGY DRYMAICNPL RYSVLMGHGV CMGLMAAACA CGFTVSLVTT SLVFHLPFHS SNQLHHFFCD ISPVLKLASQ HSGFSQLVIF MLGVFALVIP LLLILVSYIR IISAILKIPS SVGRYKTFST CASHLIVVTV HYSCASFIYL RPKTNYTSSQ DTLISVSYTI LTPLFNPMIY SLRNKEFKSA LRRTIGQTFY PLS

== See also ==
- Olfactory receptor
