= OR10H1 =

Protein-coding gene in the species Homo sapiens

Identifiers
- Aliases: OR10H1, olfactory receptor family 10 subfamily H member 1
- External IDs: MGI: 3030073; GeneCards: OR10H1

Gene location (Human)
Chr.	Chromosome 19 (human)
Band	19p13.12	Start	15,804,549 bp
Band	19p13.12	End	15,815,664 bp

Gene location (Mouse)
Chr.	Chromosome 17 (mouse)
Band	17|17 B1	Start	33,410,276 bp
Band	17|17 B1	End	33,421,480 bp
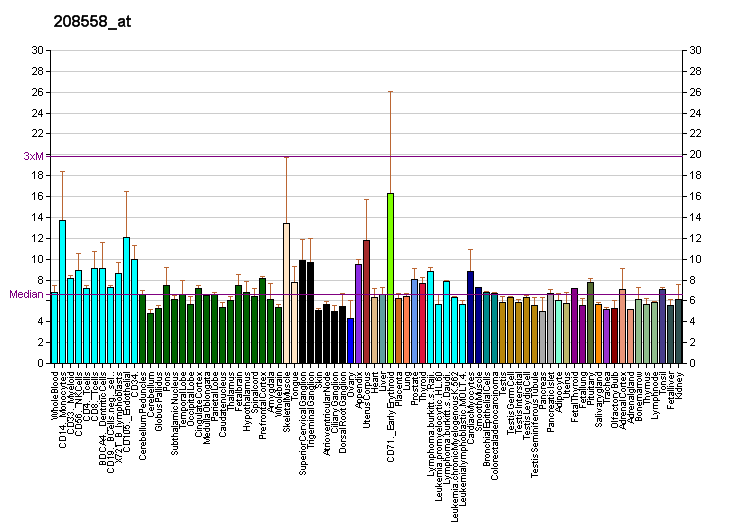
RNA expression pattern
Bgee	Human / Mouse (ortholog); Top expressed in: buccal mucosa cell; testicle; sperm; ventral tegmental area; pons; pancreatic ductal cell; urinary bladder; male reproductive gland; prostate; left testis / Top expressed in: adrenal gland; skeletal muscle tissue; More reference expression data
BioGPS	More reference expression data
Gene ontology
Molecular function	G protein-coupled receptor activity; olfactory receptor activity; signal transducer activity; neurotransmitter receptor activity; G protein-coupled serotonin receptor activity
Cellular component	integral component of membrane; plasma membrane; membrane; integral component of plasma membrane; dendrite
Biological process	sensory perception of smell; detection of chemical stimulus involved in sensory perception of smell; signal transduction; response to stimulus; G protein-coupled serotonin receptor signaling pathway; G protein-coupled receptor signaling pathway; G protein-coupled receptor signaling pathway, coupled to cyclic nucleotide second messenger; chemical synaptic transmission
Sources:Amigo / QuickGO
Orthologs
Databases	NCBI: entry; OMA: entry
Species	Human	Mouse
Entrez	26539	100038860
Ensembl	ENSG00000186723	ENSMUSG00000093884
UniProt	Q9Y4A9	A0PK55
RefSeq (mRNA)	NM_013940	NM_207175
RefSeq (protein)	NP_039228	NP_997058
Location (UCSC)	Chr 19: 15.8 – 15.82 Mb	Chr 17: 33.41 – 33.42 Mb
PubMed search
- Wikidata
View/Edit Human	View/Edit Mouse

Olfactory receptor 10H1 is a protein that in humans is encoded by the OR10H1 gene.

Olfactory receptors interact with odorant molecules in the nose, to initiate a neuronal response that triggers the perception of a smell. The olfactory receptor proteins are members of a large family of G-protein-coupled receptors (GPCR) arising from single coding-exon genes. Olfactory receptors share a 7-transmembrane domain structure with many neurotransmitter and hormone receptors and are responsible for the recognition and G protein-mediated transduction of odorant signals. The olfactory receptor gene family is the largest in the genome. The nomenclature assigned to the olfactory receptor genes and proteins for this organism is independent of other organisms.

== See also ==
- Olfactory receptor
