= OR10J1 =

Protein-coding gene in humans

Identifiers
- Aliases: OR10J1, HGMP07J, HSHGMP07J, olfactory receptor family 10 subfamily J member 1
- External IDs: MGI: 3030252; GeneCards: OR10J1

Gene location (Human)
Chr.	Chromosome 1 (human)
Band	1q23.2	Start	159,437,845 bp
Band	1q23.2	End	159,443,078 bp

Gene location (Mouse)
Chr.	Chromosome 1 (mouse)
Band	1|1 H3	Start	173,093,568 bp
Band	1|1 H3	End	173,101,561 bp
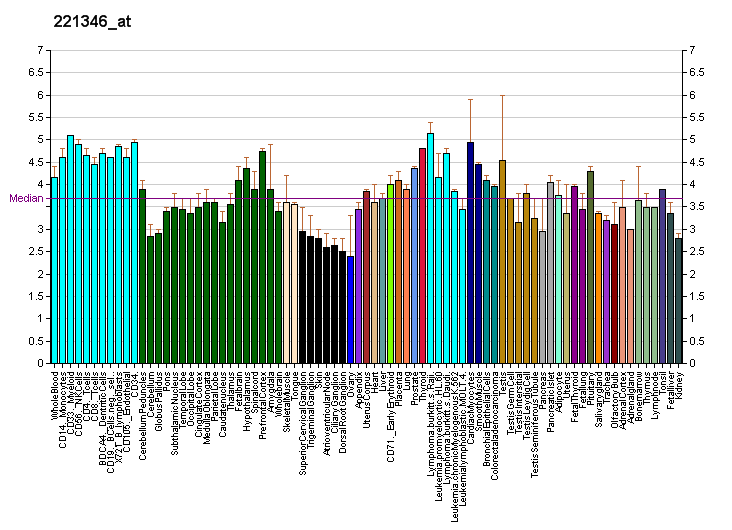
RNA expression pattern
Bgee	Human / Mouse (ortholog); Top expressed in: sperm; testicle; left testis; right testis; human musculoskeletal system; muscular system; muscle; muscle; skeletal muscle; lower limb muscles / Top expressed in: ileum; jejunum; More reference expression data
BioGPS	More reference expression data
Gene ontology
Molecular function	G protein-coupled receptor activity; olfactory receptor activity; signal transducer activity; transmembrane signaling receptor activity
Cellular component	integral component of membrane; plasma membrane; integral component of plasma membrane; membrane
Biological process	sensory perception of chemical stimulus; sensory perception of smell; detection of chemical stimulus involved in sensory perception of smell; detection of chemical stimulus involved in sensory perception; signal transduction; single fertilization; response to stimulus; G protein-coupled receptor signaling pathway
Sources:Amigo / QuickGO
Orthologs
Databases	NCBI: entry; OMA: entry
Species	Human	Mouse
Entrez	26476	258645
Ensembl	ENSG00000196184	ENSMUSG00000049605
UniProt	P30954	A0A140T8J6
RefSeq (mRNA)	NM_012351; NM_001363557; NM_001363558	NM_146651
RefSeq (protein)	NP_036483; NP_001350486; NP_001350487	NP_666862
Location (UCSC)	Chr 1: 159.44 – 159.44 Mb	Chr 1: 173.09 – 173.1 Mb
PubMed search
- Wikidata
View/Edit Human	View/Edit Mouse

Olfactory receptor 10J1 is a protein that in humans is encoded by the OR10J1 gene.

Olfactory receptors interact with odorant molecules in the nose, to initiate a neuronal response that triggers the perception of a smell. The olfactory receptor proteins are members of a large family of G-protein-coupled receptors (GPCR) arising from single coding-exon genes. Olfactory receptors share a 7-transmembrane domain structure with many neurotransmitter and hormone receptors and are responsible for the recognition and G protein-mediated transduction of odorant signals. The olfactory receptor gene family is the largest in the genome. The nomenclature assigned to the olfactory receptor genes and proteins for this organism is independent of other organisms.

== See also ==
- Olfactory receptor
