= OR10H3 =

Protein-coding gene in the species Homo sapiens

Identifiers
- Aliases: OR10H3, olfactory receptor family 10 subfamily H member 3
- External IDs: MGI: 1335096; GeneCards: OR10H3

Gene location (Human)
Chr.	Chromosome 19 (human)
Band	19p13.12	Start	15,737,985 bp
Band	19p13.12	End	15,742,343 bp

Gene location (Mouse)
Chr.	Chromosome 17 (mouse)
Band	17|17 B1	Start	33,483,650 bp
Band	17|17 B1	End	33,494,618 bp
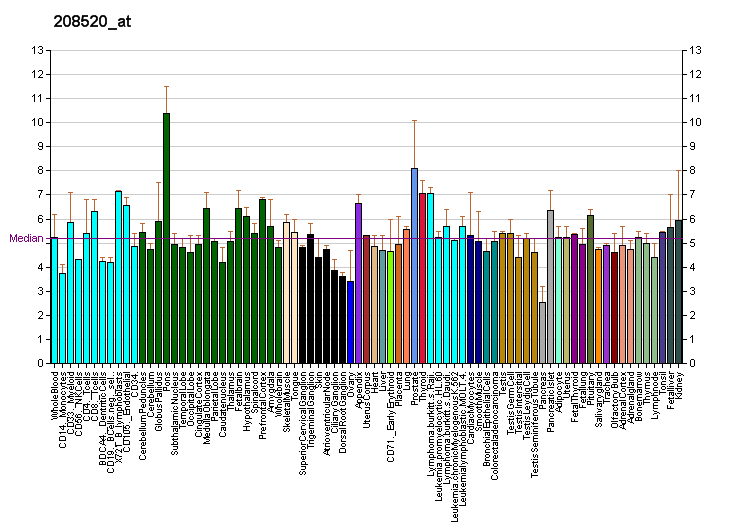
RNA expression pattern
Bgee	Human / Mouse (ortholog); Top expressed in: pancreatic ductal cell; mucosa of ileum; tibialis anterior muscle; optic nerve; skin of hip; fundus / n/a; More reference expression data
BioGPS	More reference expression data
Gene ontology
Molecular function	G protein-coupled receptor activity; olfactory receptor activity; signal transducer activity; neurotransmitter receptor activity; G protein-coupled serotonin receptor activity
Cellular component	integral component of membrane; plasma membrane; membrane; integral component of plasma membrane; dendrite
Biological process	sensory perception of smell; detection of chemical stimulus involved in sensory perception of smell; signal transduction; response to stimulus; G protein-coupled serotonin receptor signaling pathway; G protein-coupled receptor signaling pathway; G protein-coupled receptor signaling pathway, coupled to cyclic nucleotide second messenger; chemical synaptic transmission
Sources:Amigo / QuickGO
Orthologs
Databases	NCBI: entry; OMA: entry
Species	Human	Mouse
Entrez	26532	258939
Ensembl	ENSG00000171936	ENSMUSG00000054666
UniProt	O60404	Q8VBW9
RefSeq (mRNA)	NM_013938	NM_146937
RefSeq (protein)	NP_039226	NP_667148
Location (UCSC)	Chr 19: 15.74 – 15.74 Mb	Chr 17: 33.48 – 33.49 Mb
PubMed search
- Wikidata
View/Edit Human	View/Edit Mouse

Olfactory receptor 10H3 is a protein that in humans is encoded by the OR10H3 gene.

Olfactory receptors interact with odorant molecules in the nose, to initiate a neuronal response that triggers the perception of a smell. The olfactory receptor proteins are members of a large family of G-protein-coupled receptors (GPCR) arising from single coding-exon genes. Olfactory receptors share a 7-transmembrane domain structure with many neurotransmitter and hormone receptors and are responsible for the recognition and G protein-mediated transduction of odorant signals. The olfactory receptor gene family is the largest in the genome. The nomenclature assigned to the olfactory receptor genes and proteins for this organism is independent of other organisms.

== See also ==
- Olfactory receptor
