= OR5T3 =

Protein-coding gene in the species Homo sapiens

Identifiers
- Aliases: OR5T3, OR11-178, OR5T3Q, olfactory receptor family 5 subfamily T member 3
- External IDs: MGI: 3030927; GeneCards: OR5T3

Gene location (Human)
Chr.	Chromosome 11 (human)
Band	11q12.1	Start	56,252,254 bp
Band	11q12.1	End	56,253,222 bp

Gene location (Mouse)
Chr.	Chromosome 2 (mouse)
Band	2|2 D	Start	86,612,823 bp
Band	2|2 D	End	86,617,960 bp
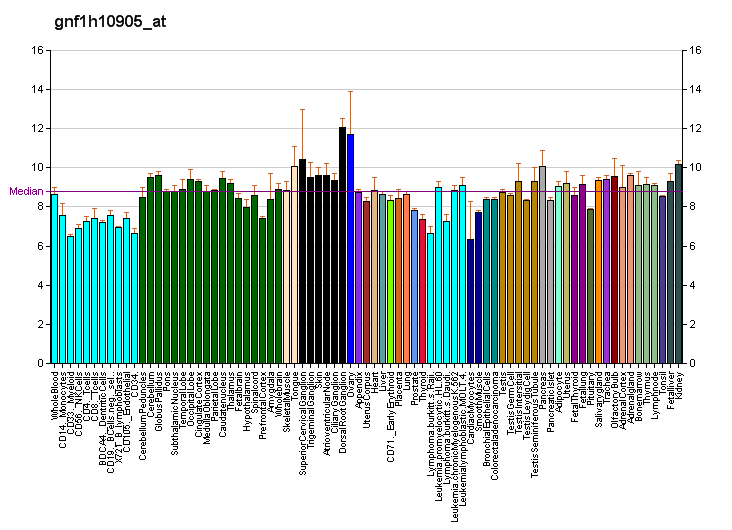
RNA expression pattern
Bgee	Human / Mouse (ortholog); Top expressed in: testicle / n/a; More reference expression data
BioGPS	More reference expression data
Gene ontology
Molecular function	G protein-coupled receptor activity; olfactory receptor activity; signal transducer activity; neurotransmitter receptor activity; G protein-coupled serotonin receptor activity
Cellular component	integral component of membrane; plasma membrane; membrane; integral component of plasma membrane; dendrite
Biological process	sensory perception of smell; detection of chemical stimulus involved in sensory perception of smell; signal transduction; response to stimulus; G protein-coupled serotonin receptor signaling pathway; G protein-coupled receptor signaling pathway; G protein-coupled receptor signaling pathway, coupled to cyclic nucleotide second messenger; chemical synaptic transmission
Sources:Amigo / QuickGO
Orthologs
Databases	NCBI: entry; OMA: entry
Species	Human	Mouse
Entrez	390154	258363
Ensembl	ENSG00000172489; ENSG00000261897	ENSMUSG00000047969
UniProt	Q8NGG3	Q8VF14
RefSeq (mRNA)	NM_001004747	NM_146366; NM_001368206
RefSeq (protein)	NP_001004747	NP_666478; NP_001355135
Location (UCSC)	Chr 11: 56.25 – 56.25 Mb	Chr 2: 86.61 – 86.62 Mb
PubMed search
- Wikidata
View/Edit Human	View/Edit Mouse

Olfactory receptor 5T3 is a protein that in humans is encoded by the OR5T3 gene.

Olfactory receptors interact with odorant molecules in the nose, to initiate a neuronal response that triggers the perception of a smell. The olfactory receptor proteins are members of a large family of G-protein-coupled receptors (GPCR) arising from single coding-exon genes. Olfactory receptors share a 7-transmembrane domain structure with many neurotransmitter and hormone receptors and are responsible for the recognition and G protein-mediated transduction of odorant signals. The olfactory receptor gene family is the largest in the genome. The nomenclature assigned to the olfactory receptor genes and proteins for this organism is independent of other organisms.

== See also ==
- Olfactory receptor
