= OR12D2 =

Protein-coding gene in the species Homo sapiens

Identifiers
- Aliases: OR12D2, DJ994E9.8, HS6M1-20, olfactory receptor family 12 subfamily D member 2 (gene/pseudogene), olfactory receptor family 12 subfamily D member 2
- External IDs: MGI: 2177484; GeneCards: OR12D2

Gene location (Human)
Chr.	Chromosome 6 (human)
Band	6p22.1	Start	29,395,631 bp
Band	6p22.1	End	29,398,008 bp

Gene location (Mouse)
Chr.	Chromosome 17 (mouse)
Band	17|17 B1	Start	37,608,447 bp
Band	17|17 B1	End	37,615,204 bp
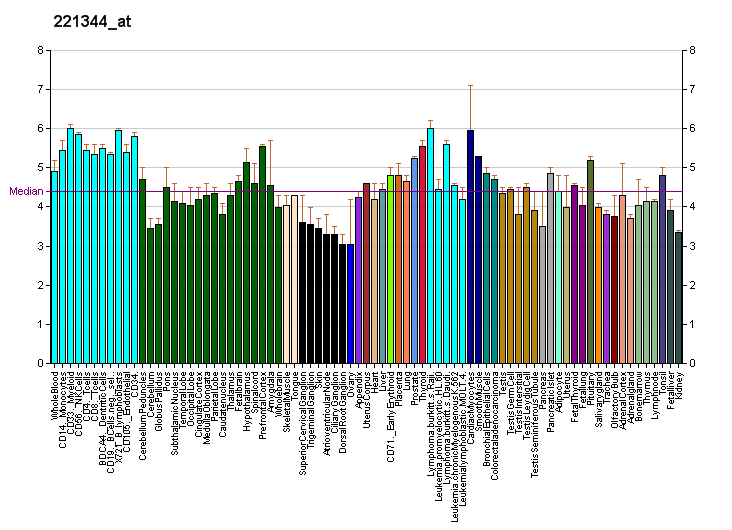
RNA expression pattern
Bgee	Human / Mouse (ortholog); Top expressed in: hypothalamus; hippocampus proper; caudate nucleus; temporal lobe; amygdala; C1 segment; Brodmann area 9; nucleus accumbens / Top expressed in: spleen; More reference expression data
BioGPS	More reference expression data
Gene ontology
Molecular function	G protein-coupled receptor activity; olfactory receptor activity; transmembrane signaling receptor activity; signal transducer activity
Cellular component	integral component of membrane; plasma membrane; membrane
Biological process	sensory perception of smell; detection of chemical stimulus involved in sensory perception of smell; detection of chemical stimulus involved in sensory perception; signal transduction; response to stimulus; G protein-coupled receptor signaling pathway
Sources:Amigo / QuickGO
Orthologs
Databases	NCBI: entry; OMA: entry
Species	Human	Mouse
Entrez	26529	258831
Ensembl	ENSG00000280236	ENSMUSG00000092077
UniProt	P58182	Q920Z0
RefSeq (mRNA)	NM_013936	NM_146834
RefSeq (protein)	NP_039224	NP_667045
Location (UCSC)	Chr 6: 29.4 – 29.4 Mb	Chr 17: 37.61 – 37.62 Mb
PubMed search
- Wikidata
View/Edit Human	View/Edit Mouse

Olfactory receptor, family 12, subfamily D, member 2, also known as OR12D2, is a protein which in humans is encoded by the OR12D2 gene.

== Function ==
Olfactory receptors interact with odorant molecules in the nose, to initiate a neuronal response that triggers the perception of a smell. The olfactory receptor proteins are members of a large family of G-protein-coupled receptors (GPCR) arising from single coding-exon genes. Olfactory receptors share a 7-transmembrane domain structure with many neurotransmitter and hormone receptors and are responsible for the recognition and G protein-mediated transduction of odorant signals. The olfactory receptor gene family is the largest in the genome. The nomenclature assigned to the olfactory receptor genes and proteins for this organism is independent of other organisms.
