= OR7C1 =

Protein-coding gene in the species Homo sapiens

Identifiers
- Aliases: OR7C1, CIT-HSP-146E8, HSTPCR86P, OR19-5, OR7C4, TPCR86, olfactory receptor family 7 subfamily C member 1
- External IDs: MGI: 3031186; GeneCards: OR7C1

Gene location (Human)
Chr.	Chromosome 19 (human)
Band	19p13.12	Start	14,789,260 bp
Band	19p13.12	End	14,835,376 bp

Gene location (Mouse)
Chr.	Chromosome 10 (mouse)
Band	10|10 C1	Start	78,816,884 bp
Band	10|10 C1	End	78,823,737 bp
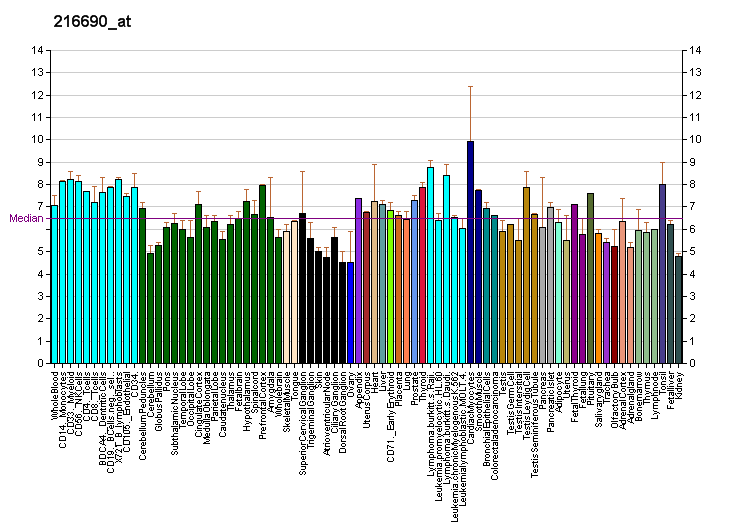
RNA expression pattern
Bgee	Human / Mouse (ortholog); Top expressed in: testicle; gonad; left adrenal cortex; anterior pituitary; right adrenal gland; right testis; right adrenal cortex; skin of leg; stromal cell of endometrium; left testis / Top expressed in: spermatid; More reference expression data
BioGPS	More reference expression data
Gene ontology
Molecular function	G protein-coupled receptor activity; olfactory receptor activity; signal transducer activity
Cellular component	integral component of membrane; plasma membrane; membrane
Biological process	sensory perception of smell; detection of chemical stimulus involved in sensory perception of smell; spermatogenesis; signal transduction; response to stimulus; G protein-coupled receptor signaling pathway
Sources:Amigo / QuickGO
Orthologs
Databases	NCBI: entry; OMA: entry
Species	Human	Mouse
Entrez	26664	259074
Ensembl	ENSG00000127530	ENSMUSG00000046493
UniProt	O76099	n/a
RefSeq (mRNA)	NM_198944; NM_001370485	NM_147071
RefSeq (protein)	NP_945182; NP_001357414	n/a
Location (UCSC)	Chr 19: 14.79 – 14.84 Mb	Chr 10: 78.82 – 78.82 Mb
PubMed search
- Wikidata
View/Edit Human	View/Edit Mouse

Olfactory receptor 7C1 is a protein that in humans is encoded by the OR7C1 gene.

Olfactory receptors interact with odorant molecules in the nose, to initiate a neuronal response that triggers the perception of a smell. The olfactory receptor proteins are members of a large family of G-protein-coupled receptors (GPCR) arising from single coding-exon genes. Olfactory receptors share a 7-transmembrane domain structure with many neurotransmitter and hormone receptors and are responsible for the recognition and G protein-mediated transduction of odorant signals. The olfactory receptor gene family is the largest in the genome. The nomenclature assigned to the olfactory receptor genes and proteins for this organism is independent of other organisms.

== See also ==
- Olfactory receptor
