= OR5P3 =

Protein-coding gene in the species Homo sapiens

Identifiers
- Aliases: OR5P3, JCG1, olfactory receptor family 5 subfamily P member 3
- External IDs: MGI: 3030342; GeneCards: OR5P3

Gene location (Human)
Chr.	Chromosome 11 (human)
Band	11p15.4	Start	7,824,818 bp
Band	11p15.4	End	7,830,840 bp

Gene location (Mouse)
Chr.	Chromosome 7 (mouse)
Band	7|7 E3	Start	108,229,201 bp
Band	7|7 E3	End	108,230,835 bp
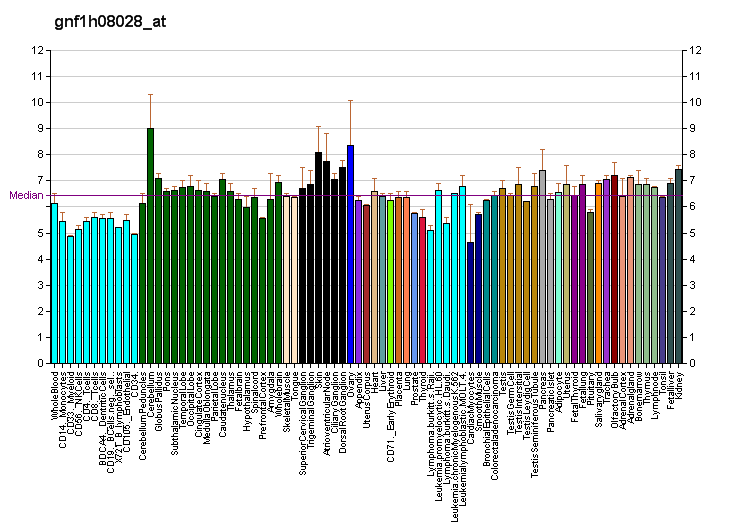
RNA expression pattern
Bgee	Human / Mouse (ortholog); Top expressed in: skin of abdomen; skin of leg; urinary bladder; lactiferous gland / n/a; More reference expression data
BioGPS	More reference expression data
Gene ontology
Molecular function	G protein-coupled receptor activity; odorant binding; olfactory receptor activity; signal transducer activity
Cellular component	integral component of membrane; plasma membrane; membrane
Biological process	sensory perception of smell; signal transduction; response to stimulus; detection of chemical stimulus involved in sensory perception of smell; G protein-coupled receptor signaling pathway
Sources:Amigo / QuickGO
Orthologs
Databases	NCBI: entry; OMA: entry
Species	Human	Mouse
Entrez	120066	258769
Ensembl	ENSG00000182334; ENSG00000280808; ENSG00000278253	ENSMUSG00000063764
UniProt	Q8WZ94	Q8VG42
RefSeq (mRNA)	NM_153445	NM_146773
RefSeq (protein)	NP_703146	NP_666984
Location (UCSC)	Chr 11: 7.82 – 7.83 Mb	Chr 7: 108.23 – 108.23 Mb
PubMed search
- Wikidata
View/Edit Human	View/Edit Mouse

Olfactory receptor 5P3 is a protein that in humans is encoded by the OR5P3 gene.

Olfactory receptors interact with odorant molecules in the nose, to initiate a neuronal response that triggers the perception of a smell. The olfactory receptor proteins are members of a large family of G-protein-coupled receptors (GPCR) arising from single coding-exon genes. Olfactory receptors share a 7-transmembrane domain structure with many neurotransmitter and hormone receptors and are responsible for the recognition and G protein-mediated transduction of odorant signals. The olfactory receptor gene family is the largest in the genome. The nomenclature assigned to the olfactory receptor genes and proteins for this organism is independent of other organisms.

== Ligands ==
The OR5P3 receptor is associated with examples of ligands includes:

- 1-octanol
- celery ketone
- (-)-carvone

== See also ==
- Olfactory receptor
