= OR52A5 =

Protein-coding gene in the species Homo sapiens

Identifiers
- Aliases: OR52A5, OR11-33, olfactory receptor family 52 subfamily A member 5
- External IDs: MGI: 1341789; GeneCards: OR52A5

Gene location (Human)
Chr.	Chromosome 11 (human)
Band	11p15.4	Start	5,128,776 bp
Band	11p15.4	End	5,138,356 bp

Gene location (Mouse)
Chr.	Chromosome 7 (mouse)
Band	7|7 E3	Start	103,415,012 bp
Band	7|7 E3	End	103,420,801 bp
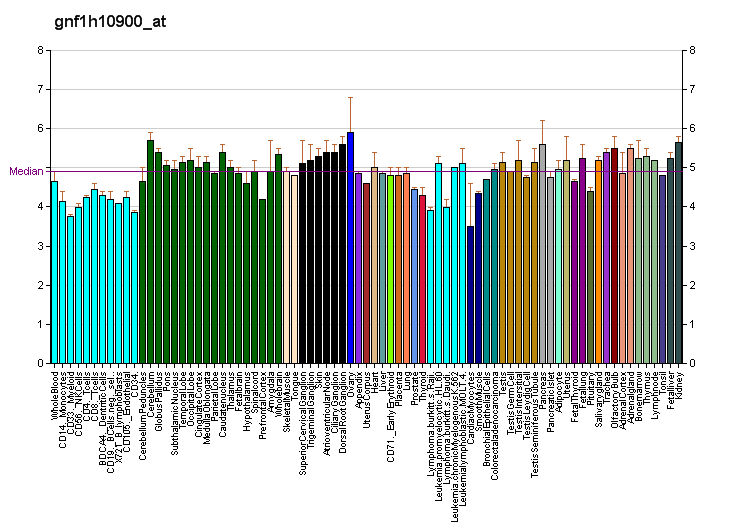
RNA expression pattern
Bgee	Human / Mouse (ortholog); Top expressed in: testicle / Top expressed in: respiratory epithelium; nasal epithelium; olfactory epithelium; nucleus of brain; telencephalic nucleus; basal forebrain; cerebral hemisphere; gray matter structure of cerebral hemisphere; septal nuclei; cerebral cortex; More reference expression data
BioGPS	More reference expression data
Gene ontology
Molecular function	G protein-coupled receptor activity; olfactory receptor activity; signal transducer activity
Cellular component	integral component of membrane; plasma membrane; membrane
Biological process	sensory perception of smell; signal transduction; response to stimulus; detection of chemical stimulus involved in sensory perception of smell; G protein-coupled receptor signaling pathway
Sources:Amigo / QuickGO
Orthologs
Databases	NCBI: entry; OMA: entry
Species	Human	Mouse
Entrez	390054	18370
Ensembl	ENSG00000171944	ENSMUSG00000058662
UniProt	Q9H2C5	E9Q7C5
RefSeq (mRNA)	NM_001005160	NM_013621
RefSeq (protein)	NP_001005160	NP_038649
Location (UCSC)	Chr 11: 5.13 – 5.14 Mb	Chr 7: 103.42 – 103.42 Mb
PubMed search
- Wikidata
View/Edit Human	View/Edit Mouse

Olfactory receptor 52A5 is a protein that in humans is encoded by the OR52A5 gene.

Olfactory receptors interact with odorant molecules in the nose, to initiate a neuronal response that triggers the perception of a smell. The olfactory receptor proteins are members of a large family of G-protein-coupled receptors (GPCR) arising from single coding-exon genes. Olfactory receptors share a 7-transmembrane domain structure with many neurotransmitter and hormone receptors and are responsible for the recognition and G protein-mediated transduction of odorant signals. The olfactory receptor gene family is the largest in the genome. The nomenclature assigned to the olfactory receptor genes and proteins for this organism is independent of other organisms.

== See also ==
- Olfactory receptor
