= OR12D3 =

Protein-coding gene in the species Homo sapiens

Identifiers
- Aliases: OR12D3, hs6M1-27, olfactory receptor family 12 subfamily D member 3
- External IDs: MGI: 2177492; GeneCards: OR12D3

Gene location (Human)
Chr.	Chromosome 6 (human)
Band	6p22.1	Start	29,373,423 bp
Band	6p22.1	End	29,375,291 bp

Gene location (Mouse)
Chr.	Chromosome 17 (mouse)
Band	17|17 B1	Start	37,769,807 bp
Band	17|17 B1	End	37,782,481 bp
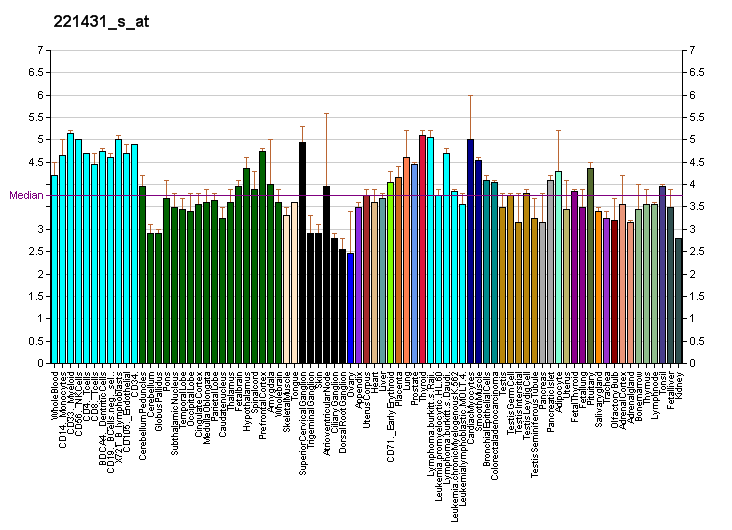
RNA expression pattern
Bgee	Human / Mouse (ortholog); Top expressed in: testicle / n/a; More reference expression data
BioGPS	More reference expression data
Gene ontology
Molecular function	G protein-coupled receptor activity; olfactory receptor activity; transmembrane signaling receptor activity; signal transducer activity
Cellular component	integral component of membrane; plasma membrane; membrane
Biological process	sensory perception of smell; detection of chemical stimulus involved in sensory perception of smell; detection of chemical stimulus involved in sensory perception; signal transduction; response to stimulus; G protein-coupled receptor signaling pathway
Sources:Amigo / QuickGO
Orthologs
Databases	NCBI: entry; OMA: entry
Species	Human	Mouse
Entrez	81797	258832
Ensembl	ENSG00000112462; ENSG00000250364; ENSG00000204692; ENSG00000224487; ENSG00000242022 ENSG00000251394; ENSG00000229181	ENSMUSG00000029184
UniProt	Q9UGF7	Q8VG96
RefSeq (mRNA)	NM_030959	NM_146835
RefSeq (protein)	NP_112221	NP_667046
Location (UCSC)	Chr 6: 29.37 – 29.38 Mb	Chr 17: 37.77 – 37.78 Mb
PubMed search
- Wikidata
View/Edit Human	View/Edit Mouse

Olfactory receptor 12D3 is a protein that in humans is encoded by the OR12D3 gene.

Olfactory receptors interact with odorant molecules in the nose, to initiate a neuronal response that triggers the perception of a smell. The olfactory receptor proteins are members of a large family of G-protein-coupled receptors (GPCR) arising from single coding-exon genes. Olfactory receptors share a 7-transmembrane domain structure with many neurotransmitter and hormone receptors and are responsible for the recognition and G protein-mediated transduction of odorant signals. The olfactory receptor gene family is the largest in the genome. The nomenclature assigned to the olfactory receptor genes and proteins for this organism is independent of other organisms.

== See also ==
- Olfactory receptor
