= OR8B8 =

Protein-coding gene in the species Homo sapiens

Identifiers
- Aliases: OR8B8, TPCR85, olfactory receptor family 8 subfamily B member 8
- External IDs: MGI: 2177528; GeneCards: OR8B8

Gene location (Human)
Chr.	Chromosome 11 (human)
Band	11q24.2	Start	124,437,445 bp
Band	11q24.2	End	124,445,696 bp

Gene location (Mouse)
Chr.	Chromosome 9 (mouse)
Band	9|9 A4	Start	37,808,020 bp
Band	9|9 A4	End	37,814,815 bp
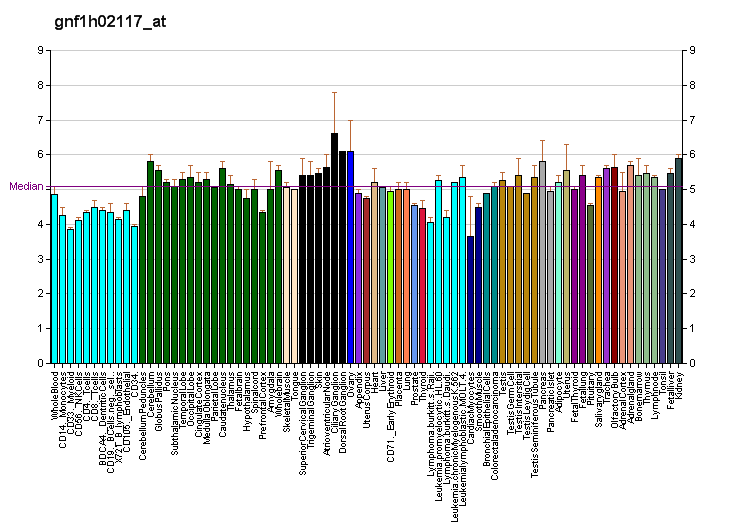
RNA expression pattern
Bgee	Human / Mouse (ortholog); Top expressed in: atrium; right auricle of heart / Top expressed in: epithelium; body proper; organ system; sensory nervous system; respiratory epithelium; sensory organ; structure with developmental contribution from neural crest; nasal epithelium; peripheral nervous system; olfactory epithelium; More reference expression data
BioGPS	More reference expression data
Gene ontology
Molecular function	G protein-coupled receptor activity; odorant binding; olfactory receptor activity; signal transducer activity
Cellular component	integral component of membrane; plasma membrane; membrane
Biological process	sensory perception of smell; signal transduction; response to stimulus; detection of chemical stimulus involved in sensory perception of smell; G protein-coupled receptor signaling pathway
Sources:Amigo / QuickGO
Orthologs
Databases	NCBI: entry; OMA: entry
Species	Human	Mouse
Entrez	26493	258310
Ensembl	ENSG00000197125	ENSMUSG00000066748
UniProt	Q15620	Q60882
RefSeq (mRNA)	NM_012378	NM_146313
RefSeq (protein)	NP_036510	NP_666425
Location (UCSC)	Chr 11: 124.44 – 124.45 Mb	Chr 9: 37.81 – 37.81 Mb
PubMed search
- Wikidata
View/Edit Human	View/Edit Mouse

Olfactory receptor 8B8 is a protein that in humans is encoded by the OR8B8 gene.

Olfactory receptors interact with odorant molecules in the nose, to initiate a neuronal response that triggers the perception of a smell. The olfactory receptor proteins are members of a large family of G-protein-coupled receptors (GPCR) arising from single coding-exon genes. Olfactory receptors share a 7-transmembrane domain structure with many neurotransmitter and hormone receptors and are responsible for the recognition and G protein-mediated transduction of odorant signals. The olfactory receptor gene family is the largest in the genome. The nomenclature assigned to the olfactory receptor genes and proteins for this organism is independent of other organisms.

== See also ==
- Olfactory receptor
