= PHF10 =

Protein-coding gene

Identifiers
- Aliases: PHF10, BAF45A, XAP135, PHD finger protein 10, SMARCG4
- External IDs: OMIM: 613069; MGI: 1919307; GeneCards: PHF10

Gene location (Human)
Chr.	Chromosome 6 (human)
Band	6q27	Start	169,703,902 bp
Band	6q27	End	169,725,566 bp

Gene location (Mouse)
Chr.	Chromosome 17 (mouse)
Band	17|17 A2	Start	15,165,271 bp
Band	17|17 A2	End	15,181,535 bp
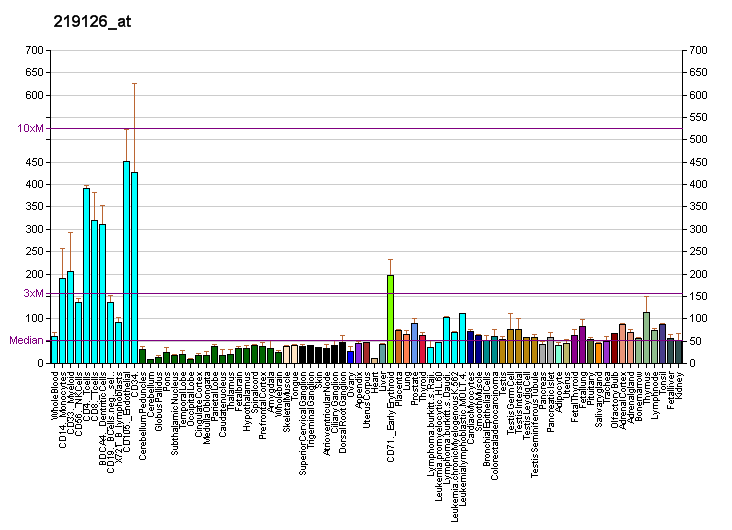
RNA expression pattern
Bgee	Human / Mouse (ortholog); Top expressed in: ventricular zone; left ovary; right adrenal cortex; right ovary; left adrenal cortex; C1 segment; Skeletal muscle tissue of rectus abdominis; gastric mucosa; right lung; body of pancreas / Top expressed in: fetal liver hematopoietic progenitor cell; calvaria; tail of embryo; spermatocyte; seminiferous tubule; abdominal wall; vas deferens; human fetus; ventricular zone; primitive streak; More reference expression data
BioGPS	More reference expression data
Gene ontology
Molecular function	protein binding; metal ion binding; histone acetyltransferase activity; histone binding
Cellular component	nucleus; npBAF complex; histone acetyltransferase complex
Biological process	regulation of transcription, DNA-templated; transcription, DNA-templated; nervous system development; histone acetylation; negative regulation of transcription, DNA-templated; positive regulation of transcription by RNA polymerase II
Sources:Amigo / QuickGO
Orthologs
Databases	NCBI: entry; OMA: entry
Species	Human	Mouse
Entrez	55274	72057
Ensembl	ENSG00000130024	ENSMUSG00000023883
UniProt	Q8WUB8	Q9D8M7
RefSeq (mRNA)	NM_133325; NM_018288	NM_024250; NM_001360983
RefSeq (protein)	NP_060758; NP_579866	NP_077212; NP_001347912
Location (UCSC)	Chr 6: 169.7 – 169.73 Mb	Chr 17: 15.17 – 15.18 Mb
PubMed search
- Wikidata
View/Edit Human	View/Edit Mouse

PHD finger protein 10 is a protein that in humans is encoded by the PHF10 gene.

== Function ==
This gene contains a predicted ORF that encodes a protein with two zinc finger domains. The function of the encoded protein is not known. Sequence analysis suggests that multiple alternatively spliced transcript variants are derived from this gene but the full-length nature of only two of them is known. These two splice variants encode different isoforms. A pseudogene for this gene is located on Xq28.
