= OR52N2 =

Protein-coding gene in the species Homo sapiens

Identifiers
- Aliases: OR52N2, OR11-57, olfactory receptor family 52 subfamily N member 2
- External IDs: MGI: 3030500; GeneCards: OR52N2

Gene location (Human)
Chr.	Chromosome 11 (human)
Band	11p15.4	Start	5,808,924 bp
Band	11p15.4	End	5,821,483 bp

Gene location (Mouse)
Chr.	Chromosome 7 (mouse)
Band	7|7 E3	Start	104,541,029 bp
Band	7|7 E3	End	104,545,159 bp
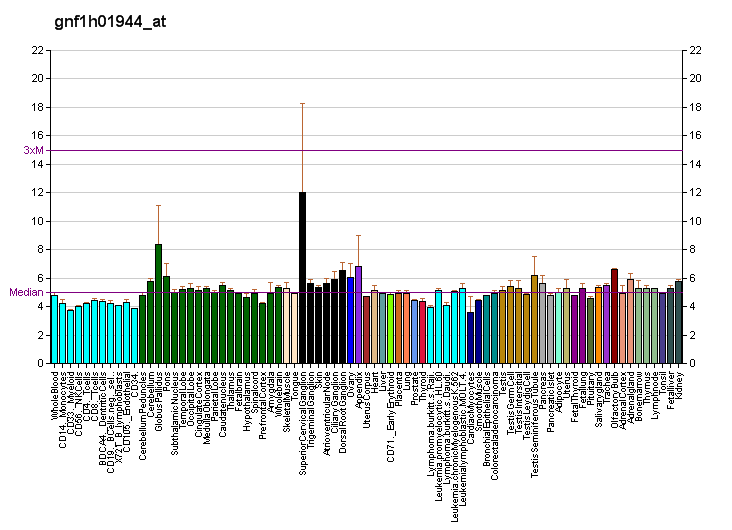
RNA expression pattern
Bgee	Human / Mouse (ortholog); Top expressed in: testicle; granulocyte; islet of Langerhans; gallbladder; tibial nerve; muscle of thigh; lymph node; prefrontal cortex; fallopian tube; haematopoietic system / Top expressed in: embryo; More reference expression data
BioGPS	More reference expression data
Gene ontology
Molecular function	G protein-coupled receptor activity; olfactory receptor activity; signal transducer activity
Cellular component	integral component of membrane; plasma membrane; membrane
Biological process	sensory perception of smell; signal transduction; response to stimulus; detection of chemical stimulus involved in sensory perception of smell; G protein-coupled receptor signaling pathway
Sources:Amigo / QuickGO
Orthologs
Databases	NCBI: entry; OMA: entry
Species	Human	Mouse
Entrez	390077	259100
Ensembl	ENSG00000180988	ENSMUSG00000063582
UniProt	Q8NGI0	Q8VH00
RefSeq (mRNA)	NM_001005174	NM_147096
RefSeq (protein)	NP_001005174	NP_667307
Location (UCSC)	Chr 11: 5.81 – 5.82 Mb	Chr 7: 104.54 – 104.55 Mb
PubMed search
- Wikidata
View/Edit Human	View/Edit Mouse

Olfactory receptor 52N2 is a protein that in humans is encoded by the OR52N2 gene.

Olfactory receptors interact with odorant molecules in the nose, to initiate a neuronal response that triggers the perception of a smell. The olfactory receptor proteins are members of a large family of G-protein-coupled receptors (GPCR) arising from single coding-exon genes. Olfactory receptors share a 7-transmembrane domain structure with many neurotransmitter and hormone receptors and are responsible for the recognition and G protein-mediated transduction of odorant signals. The olfactory receptor gene family is the largest in the genome. The nomenclature assigned to the olfactory receptor genes and proteins for this organism is independent of other organisms.

== See also ==
- Olfactory receptor
