= OR6B3 =

Protein-coding gene in the species Homo sapiens

Identifiers
- Aliases: OR6B3, OR6B3P, OR6B3Q, olfactory receptor family 6 subfamily B member 3
- External IDs: MGI: 3031248; GeneCards: OR6B3

Gene location (Human)
Chr.	Chromosome 2 (human)
Band	2q37.3	Start	240,045,077 bp
Band	2q37.3	End	240,047,027 bp

Gene location (Mouse)
Chr.	Chromosome 1 (mouse)
Band	1|1 D	Start	92,434,088 bp
Band	1|1 D	End	92,446,383 bp
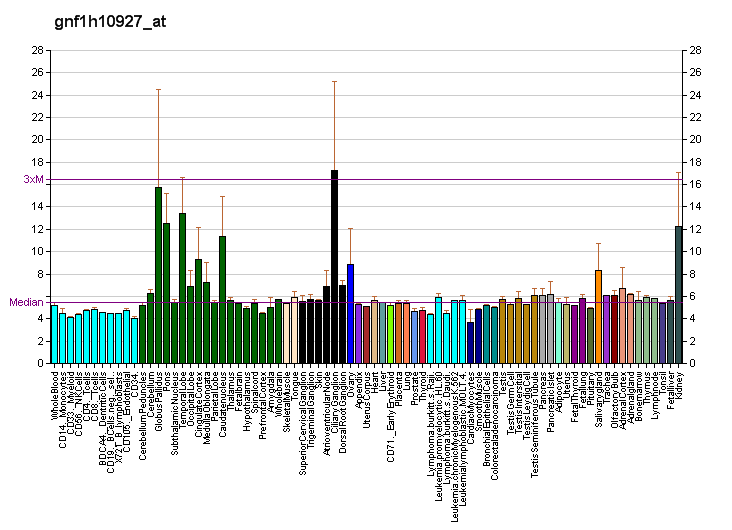
RNA expression pattern
Bgee	Human / Mouse (ortholog); Top expressed in: testicle; tibial nerve; sural nerve; C1 segment; substantia nigra; muscle of thigh; right testis; hippocampus proper; prefrontal cortex; left testis / n/a; More reference expression data
BioGPS	More reference expression data
Gene ontology
Molecular function	G protein-coupled receptor activity; odorant binding; olfactory receptor activity; signal transducer activity
Cellular component	integral component of membrane; plasma membrane; membrane
Biological process	sensory perception of smell; signal transduction; response to stimulus; detection of chemical stimulus involved in sensory perception of smell; G protein-coupled receptor signaling pathway
Sources:Amigo / QuickGO
Orthologs
Databases	NCBI: entry; OMA: entry
Species	Human	Mouse
Entrez	150681	259041
Ensembl	ENSG00000178586	ENSMUSG00000042849
UniProt	Q8NGW1	Q8VGU5
RefSeq (mRNA)	NM_173351	NM_147039
RefSeq (protein)	NP_775486	NP_667250
Location (UCSC)	Chr 2: 240.05 – 240.05 Mb	Chr 1: 92.43 – 92.45 Mb
PubMed search
- Wikidata
View/Edit Human	View/Edit Mouse

Olfactory receptor 6B3 is a protein that in humans is encoded by the OR6B3 gene.

Olfactory receptors interact with odorant molecules in the nose, to initiate a neuronal response that triggers the perception of a smell. The olfactory receptor proteins are members of a large family of G-protein-coupled receptors (GPCR) arising from single coding-exon genes. Olfactory receptors share a 7-transmembrane domain structure with many neurotransmitter and hormone receptors and are responsible for the recognition and G protein-mediated transduction of odorant signals. The olfactory receptor gene family is the largest in the genome. The nomenclature assigned to the olfactory receptor genes and proteins for this organism is independent of other organisms.

== See also ==
- Olfactory receptor
