= OR10A6 =

Protein-coding gene in the species Homo sapiens

Identifiers
- Aliases: OR10A6, OR11-96, olfactory receptor family 10 subfamily A member 6 (gene/pseudogene)
- External IDs: MGI: 3030353; GeneCards: OR10A6

Gene location (Human)
Chr.	Chromosome 11 (human)
Band	11p15.4	Start	7,924,592 bp
Band	11p15.4	End	7,931,268 bp

Gene location (Mouse)
Chr.	Chromosome 7 (mouse)
Band	7|7 E3	Start	108,492,668 bp
Band	7|7 E3	End	108,493,627 bp
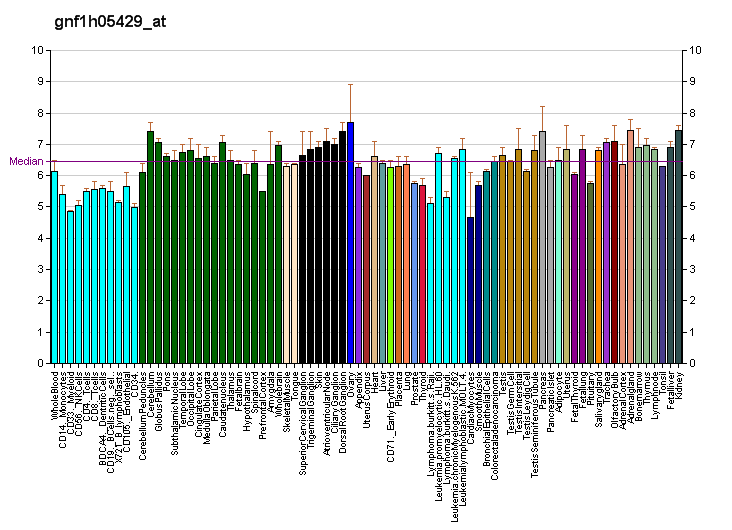
RNA expression pattern
Bgee	Human / Mouse (ortholog); Top expressed in: skin of leg; skin of abdomen; ascending aorta; prostate; tibial nerve / Top expressed in: embryo; More reference expression data
BioGPS	More reference expression data
Gene ontology
Molecular function	G protein-coupled receptor activity; signal transducer activity; olfactory receptor activity
Cellular component	membrane; plasma membrane; integral component of membrane
Biological process	sensory perception of smell; signal transduction; response to stimulus; detection of chemical stimulus involved in sensory perception of smell; G protein-coupled receptor signaling pathway
Sources:Amigo / QuickGO
Orthologs
Databases	NCBI: entry; OMA: entry
Species	Human	Mouse
Entrez	390093	277935
Ensembl	ENSG00000279000; ENSG00000280899; ENSG00000276451	ENSMUSG00000066239
UniProt	Q8NH74	n/a
RefSeq (mRNA)	NM_001004461; NM_001389574	NM_207160
RefSeq (protein)	NP_001004461	n/a
Location (UCSC)	Chr 11: 7.92 – 7.93 Mb	Chr 7: 108.49 – 108.49 Mb
PubMed search
- Wikidata
View/Edit Human	View/Edit Mouse

Olfactory receptor 10A6 is a protein that in humans is encoded by the OR10A6 gene.

Olfactory receptors interact with odorant molecules in the nose, to initiate a neuronal response that triggers the perception of a smell. The olfactory receptor proteins are members of a large family of G-protein-coupled receptors (GPCR) arising from single coding-exon genes. Olfactory receptors share a 7-transmembrane domain structure with many neurotransmitter and hormone receptors and are responsible for the recognition and G-protein-mediated transduction of odorant signals. The olfactory receptor gene family is the largest in the genome. The nomenclature assigned to the olfactory receptor genes and proteins for this organism is independent of other organisms.

== See also ==
- Olfactory receptor
