= OR9A2 =

Protein-coding gene in the species Homo sapiens

Identifiers
- Aliases: OR9A2, olfactory receptor family 9 subfamily A member 2
- External IDs: MGI: 3030293; GeneCards: OR9A2

Gene location (Human)
Chr.	Chromosome 7 (human)
Band	7q34	Start	143,026,200 bp
Band	7q34	End	143,027,132 bp

Gene location (Mouse)
Chr.	Chromosome 6 (mouse)
Band	6|6 B2.1	Start	41,745,704 bp
Band	6|6 B2.1	End	41,752,111 bp
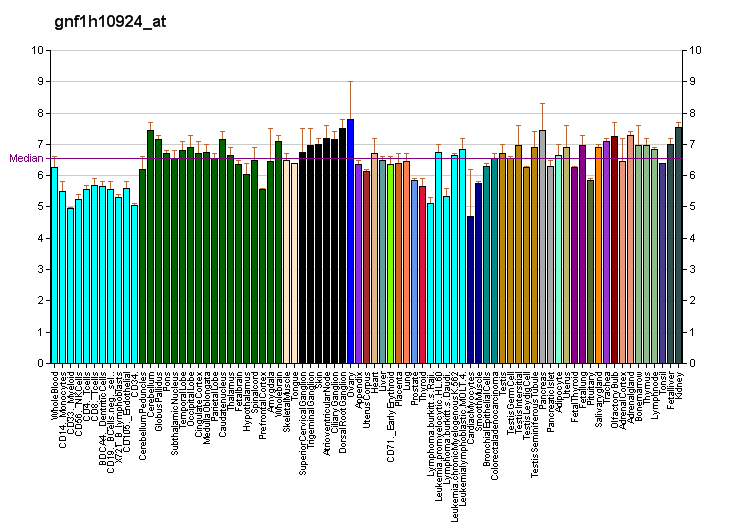
RNA expression pattern
Bgee	Human / Mouse (ortholog); Top expressed in: testicle; corpus callosum; C1 segment; substantia nigra; prefrontal cortex; hippocampus proper; placenta; temporal lobe; amygdala; caudate nucleus / n/a; More reference expression data
BioGPS	More reference expression data
Gene ontology
Molecular function	olfactory receptor activity; signal transducer activity; G protein-coupled receptor activity
Cellular component	integral component of membrane; plasma membrane; membrane
Biological process	sensory perception of smell; detection of chemical stimulus involved in sensory perception of smell; signal transduction; response to stimulus; G protein-coupled receptor signaling pathway
Sources:Amigo / QuickGO
Orthologs
Databases	NCBI: entry; OMA: entry
Species	Human	Mouse
Entrez	135924	258569
Ensembl	ENSG00000273914; ENSG00000179468	ENSMUSG00000045479
UniProt	Q8NGT5	Q924H8
RefSeq (mRNA)	NM_001001658	NM_146576
RefSeq (protein)	NP_001001658	NP_666787
Location (UCSC)	Chr 7: 143.03 – 143.03 Mb	Chr 6: 41.75 – 41.75 Mb
PubMed search
- Wikidata
View/Edit Human	View/Edit Mouse

Olfactory receptor 9A2 is a protein that in humans is encoded by the OR9A2 gene.

Olfactory receptors interact with odorant molecules in the nose, to initiate a neuronal response that triggers the perception of a smell. The olfactory receptor proteins are members of a large family of G-protein-coupled receptors (GPCR) arising from single coding-exon genes. Olfactory receptors share a 7-transmembrane domain structure with many neurotransmitter and hormone receptors and are responsible for the recognition and G protein-mediated transduction of odorant signals. The olfactory receptor gene family is the largest in the genome. The nomenclature assigned to the olfactory receptor genes and proteins for this organism is independent of other organisms.

== See also ==
- Olfactory receptor
