= OR10C1 =

Protein-coding gene in the species Homo sapiens

Identifiers
- Aliases: OR10C1, OR10C1P, OR10C2, OR6-31, hs6M1-17, olfactory receptor family 10 subfamily C member 1 (gene/pseudogene), olfactory receptor family 10 subfamily C member 1
- External IDs: MGI: 2177478; GeneCards: OR10C1

Gene location (Human)
Chr.	Chromosome 6 (human)
Band	6p22.1	Start	29,439,306 bp
Band	6p22.1	End	29,440,977 bp

Gene location (Mouse)
Chr.	Chromosome 17 (mouse)
Band	17|17 B1	Start	37,518,841 bp
Band	17|17 B1	End	37,524,009 bp
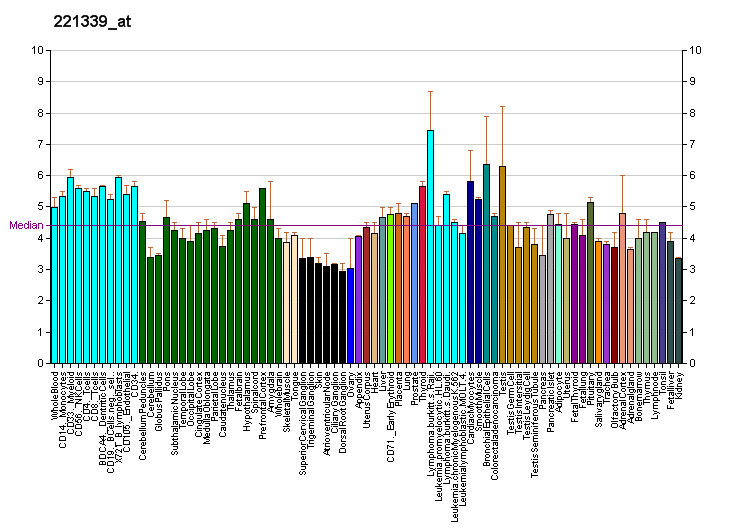
RNA expression pattern
Bgee	Human / Mouse (ortholog); Top expressed in: bone marrow cell / n/a; More reference expression data
BioGPS	More reference expression data
Gene ontology
Molecular function	G protein-coupled receptor activity; olfactory receptor activity; signal transducer activity
Cellular component	integral component of membrane; plasma membrane; membrane
Biological process	sensory perception of smell; signal transduction; response to stimulus; detection of chemical stimulus involved in sensory perception of smell; G protein-coupled receptor signaling pathway
Sources:Amigo / QuickGO
Orthologs
Databases	NCBI: entry; OMA: entry
Species	Human	Mouse
Entrez	442194	258506
Ensembl	ENSG00000206474	ENSMUSG00000049561
UniProt	Q96KK4	Q8VFE2
RefSeq (mRNA)	NM_013941	NM_146513
RefSeq (protein)	NP_039229	NP_666724
Location (UCSC)	Chr 6: 29.44 – 29.44 Mb	Chr 17: 37.52 – 37.52 Mb
PubMed search
- Wikidata
View/Edit Human	View/Edit Mouse

Olfactory receptor 10C1 is a protein that in humans is encoded by the OR10C1 gene.

Olfactory receptors interact with odorant molecules in the nose, to initiate a neuronal response that triggers the perception of a smell. The olfactory receptor proteins are members of a large family of G-protein-coupled receptors (GPCR) arising from single coding-exon genes. Olfactory receptors share a 7-transmembrane domain structure with many neurotransmitter and hormone receptors and are responsible for the recognition and G protein-mediated transduction of odorant signals. The olfactory receptor gene family is the largest in the genome. The nomenclature assigned to the olfactory receptor genes and proteins for this organism is independent of other organisms.

== See also ==
- Olfactory receptor
