= OR11L1 =

Protein-coding gene in humans

Identifiers
- Aliases: OR11L1, olfactory receptor family 11 subfamily L member 1
- External IDs: MGI: 3030157; GeneCards: OR11L1

Gene location (Human)
Chr.	Chromosome 1 (human)
Band	1q44	Start	247,840,928 bp
Band	1q44	End	247,841,896 bp

Gene location (Mouse)
Chr.	Chromosome 11 (mouse)
Band	11|11 B1.3	Start	58,514,985 bp
Band	11|11 B1.3	End	58,521,327 bp
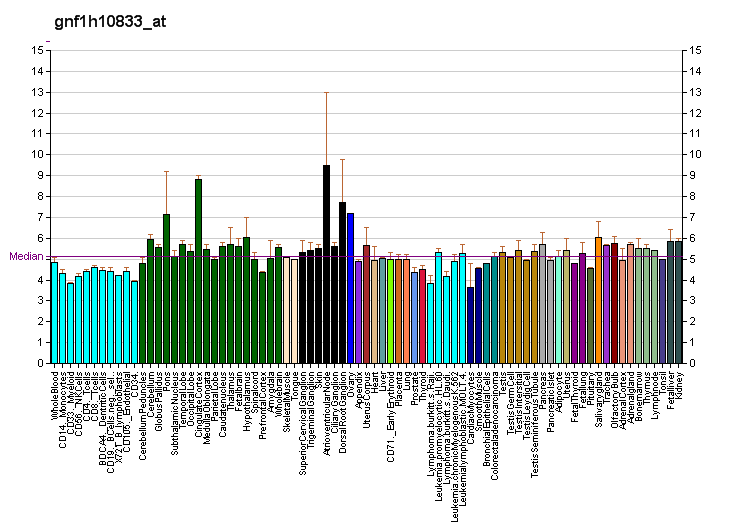
RNA expression pattern
Bgee	Human / Mouse (ortholog); Top expressed in: right lobe of thyroid gland; left lobe of thyroid gland / Top expressed in: spermatid; stomach; segment of brain; prosencephalon; More reference expression data
BioGPS	More reference expression data
Gene ontology
Molecular function	G protein-coupled receptor activity; odorant binding; olfactory receptor activity; signal transducer activity; molecular function
Cellular component	integral component of membrane; plasma membrane; extracellular exosome; membrane
Biological process	sensory perception of smell; signal transduction; response to stimulus; detection of chemical stimulus involved in sensory perception of smell; G protein-coupled receptor signaling pathway; biological process
Sources:Amigo / QuickGO
Orthologs
Databases	NCBI: entry; OMA: entry
Species	Human	Mouse
Entrez	391189	258373
Ensembl	ENSG00000197591	ENSMUSG00000043880
UniProt	Q8NGX0	n/a
RefSeq (mRNA)	NM_001001959	NM_146376
RefSeq (protein)	NP_001001959	n/a
Location (UCSC)	Chr 1: 247.84 – 247.84 Mb	Chr 11: 58.51 – 58.52 Mb
PubMed search
- Wikidata
View/Edit Human	View/Edit Mouse

Olfactory receptor 11L1 is a protein that in humans is encoded by the OR11L1 gene.

Olfactory receptors interact with odorant molecules in the nose, to initiate a neuronal response that triggers the perception of a smell. The olfactory receptor proteins are members of a large family of G-protein-coupled receptors (GPCR) arising from single coding-exon genes. Olfactory receptors share a 7-transmembrane domain structure with many neurotransmitter and hormone receptors and are responsible for the recognition and G protein-mediated transduction of odorant signals. The olfactory receptor gene family is the largest in the genome. The nomenclature assigned to the olfactory receptor genes and proteins for this organism is independent of other organisms.

== See also ==
- Olfactory receptor
