= OR7C2 =

Protein-coding gene in the species Homo sapiens

Identifiers
- Aliases: OR7C2, CIT-HSP-87M17, OR19-18, OR7C3, olfactory receptor family 7 subfamily C member 2, olfactory receptor family 7 subfamily C member 2 (gene/pseudogene)
- External IDs: MGI: 3031190; GeneCards: OR7C2

Gene location (Human)
Chr.	Chromosome 19 (human)
Band	19p13.12	Start	14,941,489 bp
Band	19p13.12	End	14,942,448 bp

Gene location (Mouse)
Chr.	Chromosome 10 (mouse)
Band	10|10 C1	Start	78,680,886 bp
Band	10|10 C1	End	78,688,000 bp
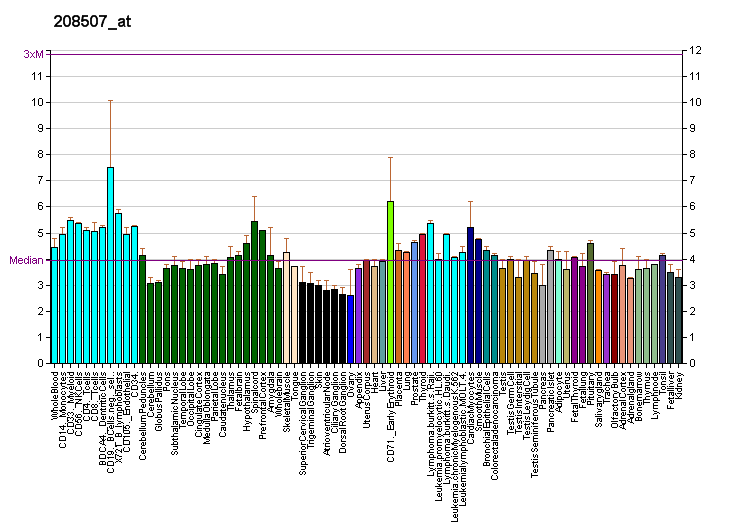
RNA expression pattern
Bgee	Human / Mouse (ortholog); Top expressed in: sural nerve / n/a; More reference expression data
BioGPS	More reference expression data
Gene ontology
Molecular function	G protein-coupled receptor activity; olfactory receptor activity; signal transducer activity
Cellular component	integral component of membrane; plasma membrane; membrane
Biological process	sensory perception of smell; detection of chemical stimulus involved in sensory perception of smell; signal transduction; response to stimulus; G protein-coupled receptor signaling pathway
Sources:Amigo / QuickGO
Orthologs
Databases	NCBI: entry; OMA: entry
Species	Human	Mouse
Entrez	26658	258305
Ensembl	ENSG00000127529	ENSMUSG00000051190
UniProt	O60412	Q7TQU8
RefSeq (mRNA)	NM_012377	NM_146308
RefSeq (protein)	NP_036509	NP_666420
Location (UCSC)	Chr 19: 14.94 – 14.94 Mb	Chr 10: 78.68 – 78.69 Mb
PubMed search
- Wikidata
View/Edit Human	View/Edit Mouse

Olfactory receptor 7C2 is a protein that in humans is encoded by the OR7C2 gene.

Olfactory receptors interact with odorant molecules in the nose, to initiate a neuronal response that triggers the perception of a smell. The olfactory receptor proteins are members of a large family of G-protein-coupled receptors (GPCR) arising from single coding-exon genes. Olfactory receptors share a 7-transmembrane domain structure with many neurotransmitter and hormone receptors and are responsible for the recognition and G protein-mediated transduction of odorant signals. The olfactory receptor gene family is the largest in the genome. The nomenclature assigned to the olfactory receptor genes and proteins for this organism is independent of other organisms.

== See also ==
- Olfactory receptor
