= OR13D1 =

Protein-coding gene in the species Homo sapiens

Identifiers
- Aliases: OR13D1, OR9-15, olfactory receptor family 13 subfamily D member 1
- External IDs: MGI: 3030104; GeneCards: OR13D1

Gene location (Human)
Chr.	Chromosome 9 (human)
Band	9q31.1	Start	104,694,518 bp
Band	9q31.1	End	104,695,462 bp

Gene location (Mouse)
Chr.	Chromosome 4 (mouse)
Band	4|4 B2	Start	52,964,547 bp
Band	4|4 B2	End	52,972,474 bp
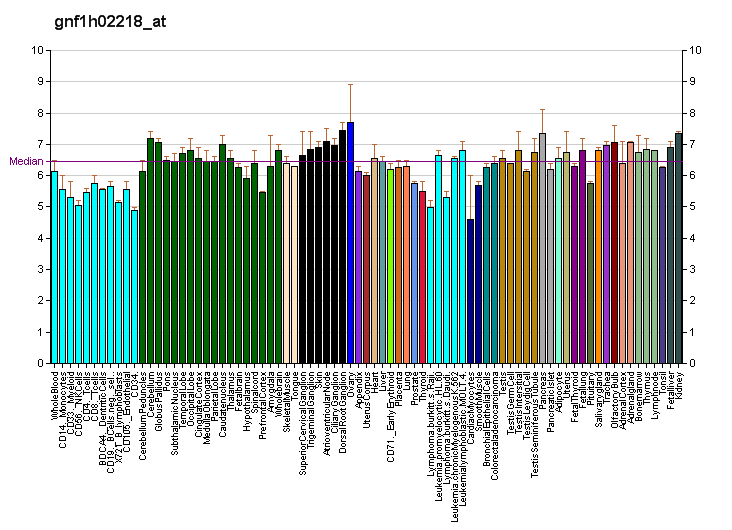
RNA expression pattern
Bgee	Human / Mouse (ortholog); Top expressed in: sural nerve; apex of heart / Top expressed in: respiratory epithelium; peripheral nervous system; nasal epithelium; olfactory epithelium; spleen; More reference expression data
BioGPS	More reference expression data
Gene ontology
Molecular function	G protein-coupled receptor activity; olfactory receptor activity; signal transducer activity
Cellular component	integral component of membrane; plasma membrane; membrane
Biological process	sensory perception of smell; signal transduction; response to stimulus; detection of chemical stimulus involved in sensory perception of smell; G protein-coupled receptor signaling pathway
Sources:Amigo / QuickGO
Orthologs
Databases	NCBI: entry; OMA: entry
Species	Human	Mouse
Entrez	286365	258600
Ensembl	ENSG00000179055	ENSMUSG00000070983
UniProt	Q8NGV5	n/a
RefSeq (mRNA)	NM_001004484	NM_146607
RefSeq (protein)	NP_001004484	n/a
Location (UCSC)	Chr 9: 104.69 – 104.7 Mb	Chr 4: 52.96 – 52.97 Mb
PubMed search
- Wikidata
View/Edit Human	View/Edit Mouse

Olfactory receptor 13D1 is a protein that in humans is encoded by the OR13D1 gene.

Olfactory receptors interact with odorant molecules in the nose, to initiate a neuronal response that triggers the perception of a smell. The olfactory receptor proteins are members of a large family of G-protein-coupled receptors (GPCR) arising from single coding-exon genes. Olfactory receptors share a 7-transmembrane domain structure with many neurotransmitter and hormone receptors and are responsible for the recognition and G protein-mediated transduction of odorant signals. The olfactory receptor gene family is the largest in the genome. The nomenclature assigned to the olfactory receptor genes and proteins for this organism is independent of other organisms.

== See also ==
- Olfactory receptor
