= OR52B4 =

Protein-coding gene in the species Homo sapiens

Identifiers
- Aliases: OR52B4, OR11-3, olfactory receptor family 52 subfamily B member 4 (gene/pseudogene), olfactory receptor family 52 subfamily B member 4
- External IDs: MGI: 3030381; GeneCards: OR52B4

Gene location (Human)
Chr.	Chromosome 11 (human)
Band	11p15.4	Start	4,367,263 bp
Band	11p15.4	End	4,368,386 bp

Gene location (Mouse)
Chr.	Chromosome 7 (mouse)
Band	7|7 E3	Start	102,183,956 bp
Band	7|7 E3	End	102,184,891 bp
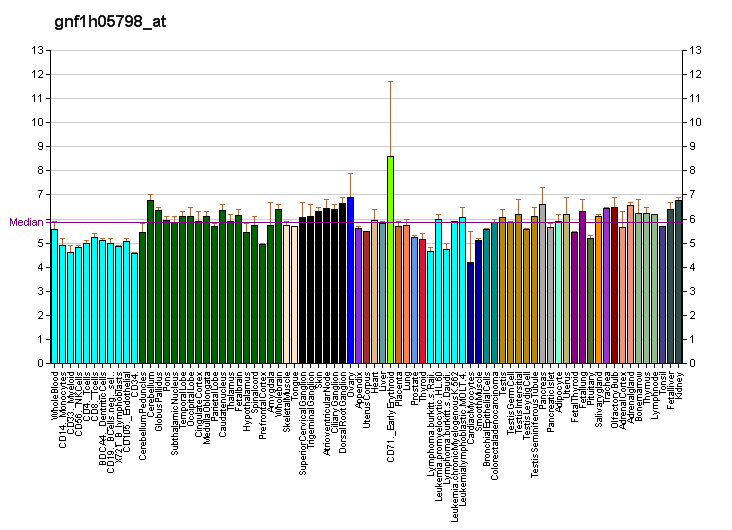
RNA expression pattern
Bgee	Human / Mouse (ortholog); Top expressed in: blood; brain; multicellular organism / n/a; More reference expression data
BioGPS	More reference expression data
Gene ontology
Molecular function	G protein-coupled receptor activity; signal transducer activity; olfactory receptor activity
Cellular component	integral component of membrane; membrane; plasma membrane
Biological process	G protein-coupled receptor signaling pathway; sensory perception of smell; cognition; signal transduction; response to stimulus; detection of chemical stimulus involved in sensory perception of smell
Sources:Amigo / QuickGO
Orthologs
Databases	NCBI: entry; OMA: entry
Species	Human	Mouse
Entrez	143496	259083
Ensembl	ENSG00000221996	ENSMUSG00000073979
UniProt	Q8NGK2	E9PXN3
RefSeq (mRNA)	NM_001005161	NM_147079
RefSeq (protein)	NP_001005161	NP_667290
Location (UCSC)	Chr 11: 4.37 – 4.37 Mb	Chr 7: 102.18 – 102.18 Mb
PubMed search
- Wikidata
View/Edit Human	View/Edit Mouse

Olfactory receptor 52B4 is a protein that in humans is encoded by the OR52B4 gene.

Olfactory receptors interact with odorant molecules in the nose, to initiate a neuronal response that triggers the perception of a smell. The olfactory receptor proteins are members of a large family of G-protein-coupled receptors (GPCR) arising from single coding-exon genes. Olfactory receptors share a 7-transmembrane domain structure with many neurotransmitter and hormone receptors and are responsible for the recognition and G protein-mediated transduction of odorant signals. The olfactory receptor gene family is the largest in the genome. The nomenclature assigned to the olfactory receptor genes and proteins for this organism is independent of other organisms.

== See also ==
- Olfactory receptor
