= OR10K2 =

Protein-coding gene in humans

Identifiers
- Aliases: OR10K2, OR1-4, olfactory receptor family 10 subfamily K member 2
- External IDs: MGI: 3030204; GeneCards: OR10K2

Gene location (Human)
Chr.	Chromosome 1 (human)
Band	1q23.1	Start	158,418,210 bp
Band	1q23.1	End	158,426,237 bp

Gene location (Mouse)
Chr.	Chromosome 8 (mouse)
Band	8|8 C2	Start	84,262,409 bp
Band	8|8 C2	End	84,271,856 bp
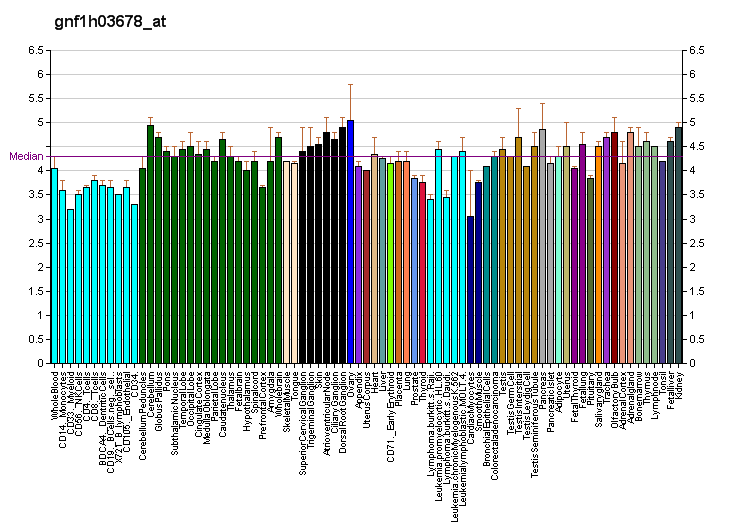
RNA expression pattern
Bgee	Human / Mouse (ortholog); Top expressed in: kidney; muscle of leg; blood; multicellular organism / n/a; More reference expression data
BioGPS	More reference expression data
Gene ontology
Molecular function	G protein-coupled receptor activity; olfactory receptor activity; transmembrane signaling receptor activity; signal transducer activity
Cellular component	integral component of membrane; plasma membrane; membrane
Biological process	sensory perception of smell; detection of chemical stimulus involved in sensory perception of smell; detection of chemical stimulus involved in sensory perception; signal transduction; response to stimulus; G protein-coupled receptor signaling pathway
Sources:Amigo / QuickGO
Orthologs
Databases	NCBI: entry; OMA: entry
Species	Human	Mouse
Entrez	391107	258267
Ensembl	ENSG00000180708	ENSMUSG00000047286
UniProt	Q6IF99	E9Q848
RefSeq (mRNA)	NM_001004476	NM_146270
RefSeq (protein)	NP_001004476	NP_666382
Location (UCSC)	Chr 1: 158.42 – 158.43 Mb	Chr 8: 84.26 – 84.27 Mb
PubMed search
- Wikidata
View/Edit Human	View/Edit Mouse

Olfactory receptor 10K2 is a protein that in humans is encoded by the OR10K2 gene.

Olfactory receptors interact with odorant molecules in the nose, to initiate a neuronal response that triggers the perception of a smell. The olfactory receptor proteins are members of a large family of G-protein-coupled receptors (GPCR) arising from single coding-exon genes. Olfactory receptors share a 7-transmembrane domain structure with many neurotransmitter and hormone receptors and are responsible for the recognition and G protein-mediated transduction of odorant signals. The olfactory receptor gene family is the largest in the genome. The nomenclature assigned to the olfactory receptor genes and proteins for this organism is independent of other organisms.

== See also ==
- Olfactory receptor
