= OR8D2 =

Protein-coding gene in the species Homo sapiens

Identifiers
- Aliases: OR8D2, JCG2, olfactory receptor family 8 subfamily D member 2 (gene/pseudogene), olfactory receptor family 8 subfamily D member 2
- External IDs: MGI: 3030758; GeneCards: OR8D2

Gene location (Human)
Chr.	Chromosome 11 (human)
Band	11q24.2	Start	124,319,262 bp
Band	11q24.2	End	124,320,197 bp

Gene location (Mouse)
Chr.	Chromosome 9 (mouse)
Band	9|9 A5.1	Start	38,755,745 bp
Band	9|9 A5.1	End	38,762,791 bp
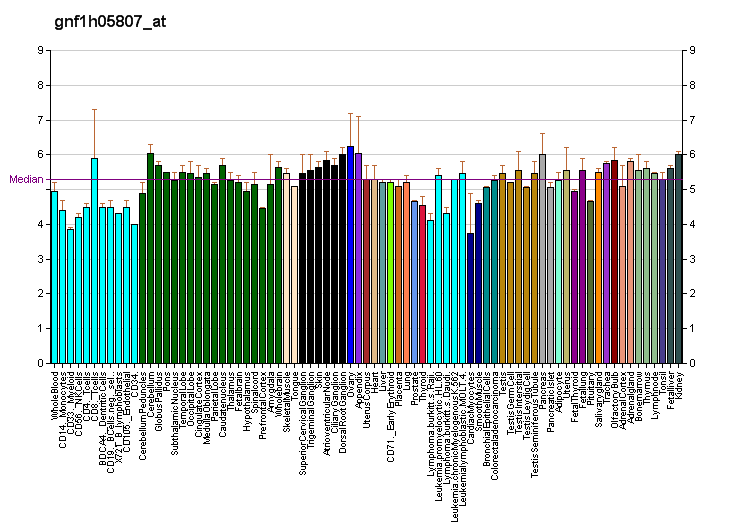
RNA expression pattern
Bgee	Human / Mouse (ortholog); Top expressed in: testicle / n/a; More reference expression data
BioGPS	More reference expression data
Gene ontology
Molecular function	G protein-coupled receptor activity; odorant binding; signal transducer activity; olfactory receptor activity
Cellular component	integral component of membrane; membrane; plasma membrane
Biological process	sensory perception of smell; signal transduction; response to stimulus; detection of chemical stimulus involved in sensory perception of smell; G protein-coupled receptor signaling pathway
Sources:Amigo / QuickGO
Orthologs
Databases	NCBI: entry; OMA: entry
Species	Human	Mouse
Entrez	283160	404322
Ensembl	ENSG00000279116	ENSMUSG00000062103
UniProt	Q9GZM6	Q7TRB8
RefSeq (mRNA)	NM_001002918	NM_207560
RefSeq (protein)	NP_001002918	NP_997443
Location (UCSC)	Chr 11: 124.32 – 124.32 Mb	Chr 9: 38.76 – 38.76 Mb
PubMed search
- Wikidata
View/Edit Human	View/Edit Mouse

Olfactory receptor 8D2 is a protein that in humans is encoded by the OR8D2 gene.

Olfactory receptors interact with odorant molecules in the nose, to initiate a neuronal response that triggers the perception of a smell. The olfactory receptor proteins are members of a large family of G-protein-coupled receptors (GPCR) arising from single coding-exon genes. Olfactory receptors share a 7-transmembrane domain structure with many neurotransmitter and hormone receptors and are responsible for the recognition and G protein-mediated transduction of odorant signals. The olfactory receptor gene family is the largest in the genome. The nomenclature assigned to the olfactory receptor genes and proteins for this organism is independent of other organisms.

== See also ==
- Olfactory receptor
