= OR10W1 =

Protein-coding gene in the species Homo sapiens

Identifiers
- Aliases: OR10W1, OR10W1P, OR10W1Q, OR11-236, UNQ6469, olfactory receptor family 10 subfamily W member 1
- External IDs: MGI: 3031324; GeneCards: OR10W1

Gene location (Human)
Chr.	Chromosome 11 (human)
Band	11q12.1	Start	58,266,792 bp
Band	11q12.1	End	58,268,260 bp

Gene location (Mouse)
Chr.	Chromosome 19 (mouse)
Band	19|19 A	Start	13,628,455 bp
Band	19|19 A	End	13,636,909 bp
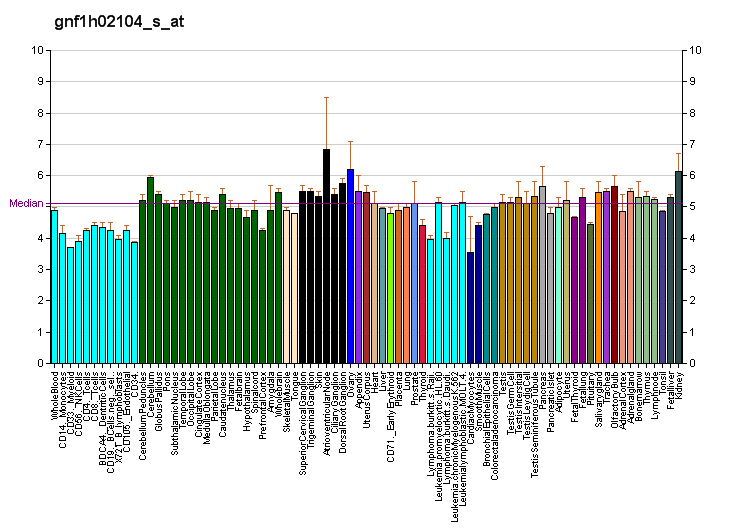
RNA expression pattern
Bgee	Human / Mouse (ortholog); n/a / Top expressed in: respiratory epithelium; nasal epithelium; olfactory epithelium
BioGPS	More reference expression data
Gene ontology
Molecular function	G protein-coupled receptor activity; odorant binding; olfactory receptor activity; signal transducer activity
Cellular component	integral component of membrane; plasma membrane; membrane
Biological process	sensory perception of smell; signal transduction; response to stimulus; detection of chemical stimulus involved in sensory perception of smell; G protein-coupled receptor signaling pathway
Sources:Amigo / QuickGO
Orthologs
Databases	NCBI: entry; OMA: entry
Species	Human	Mouse
Entrez	81341	258098
Ensembl	ENSG00000172772	ENSMUSG00000061387
UniProt	Q8NGF6	n/a
RefSeq (mRNA)	NM_207374	NM_001011832
RefSeq (protein)	NP_997257	n/a
Location (UCSC)	Chr 11: 58.27 – 58.27 Mb	Chr 19: 13.63 – 13.64 Mb
PubMed search
- Wikidata
View/Edit Human	View/Edit Mouse

Olfactory receptor 10W1 is a protein that in humans is encoded by the OR10W1 gene.

Olfactory receptors interact with odorant molecules in the nose, to initiate a neuronal response that triggers the perception of a smell. The olfactory receptor proteins are members of a large family of G-protein-coupled receptors (GPCR) arising from single coding-exon genes. Olfactory receptors share a 7-transmembrane domain structure with many neurotransmitter and hormone receptors and are responsible for the recognition and G protein-mediated transduction of odorant signals. The olfactory receptor gene family is the largest in the genome. The nomenclature assigned to the olfactory receptor genes and proteins for this organism is independent of other organisms.

== See also ==
- Olfactory receptor
