= OR13C8 =

Protein-coding gene in the species Homo sapiens

Identifiers
- Aliases: OR13C8, OR37H, OR9-10, olfactory receptor family 13 subfamily C member 8
- External IDs: MGI: 3030106; GeneCards: OR13C8

Gene location (Human)
Chr.	Chromosome 9 (human)
Band	9q31.1	Start	104,569,168 bp
Band	9q31.1	End	104,570,130 bp

Gene location (Mouse)
Chr.	Chromosome 4 (mouse)
Band	4|4 B2	Start	52,910,207 bp
Band	4|4 B2	End	52,919,178 bp
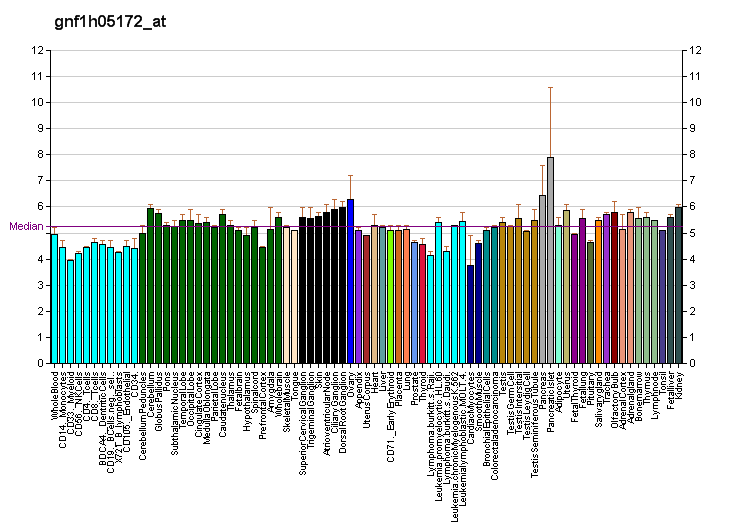
RNA expression pattern
Bgee	Human / Mouse (ortholog); n/a / Top expressed in: respiratory epithelium; peripheral nervous system; nasal epithelium; olfactory epithelium; lens
BioGPS	More reference expression data
Gene ontology
Molecular function	olfactory receptor activity; signal transducer activity; G protein-coupled receptor activity
Cellular component	membrane; integral component of membrane; plasma membrane
Biological process	sensory perception of smell; signal transduction; response to stimulus; detection of chemical stimulus involved in sensory perception of smell; G protein-coupled receptor signaling pathway
Sources:Amigo / QuickGO
Orthologs
Databases	NCBI: entry; OMA: entry
Species	Human	Mouse
Entrez	138802	258836
Ensembl	ENSG00000186943	ENSMUSG00000051593
UniProt	Q8NGS7	Q8VGA0
RefSeq (mRNA)	NM_001004483	NM_146839
RefSeq (protein)	NP_001004483	NP_667050
Location (UCSC)	Chr 9: 104.57 – 104.57 Mb	Chr 4: 52.91 – 52.92 Mb
PubMed search
- Wikidata
View/Edit Human	View/Edit Mouse

Olfactory receptor 13C8 is a protein that in humans is encoded by the OR13C8 gene.

Olfactory receptors interact with odorant molecules in the nose, to initiate a neuronal response that triggers the perception of a smell. The olfactory receptor proteins are members of a large family of G-protein-coupled receptors (GPCR) arising from single coding-exon genes. Olfactory receptors share a 7-transmembrane domain structure with many neurotransmitter and hormone receptors and are responsible for the recognition and G protein-mediated transduction of odorant signals. The olfactory receptor gene family is the largest in the genome. The nomenclature assigned to the olfactory receptor genes and proteins for this organism is independent of other organisms.

== See also ==
- Olfactory receptor
