= OR5W2 =

Protein-coding gene in the species Homo sapiens

Identifiers
- Aliases: OR5W2, OR5W2P, OR5W3P, olfactory receptor family 5 subfamily W member 2
- External IDs: MGI: 3030985; GeneCards: OR5W2

Gene location (Human)
Chr.	Chromosome 11 (human)
Band	11q12.1	Start	55,913,650 bp
Band	11q12.1	End	55,914,582 bp

Gene location (Mouse)
Chr.	Chromosome 2 (mouse)
Band	2|2 D	Start	87,686,206 bp
Band	2|2 D	End	87,690,267 bp
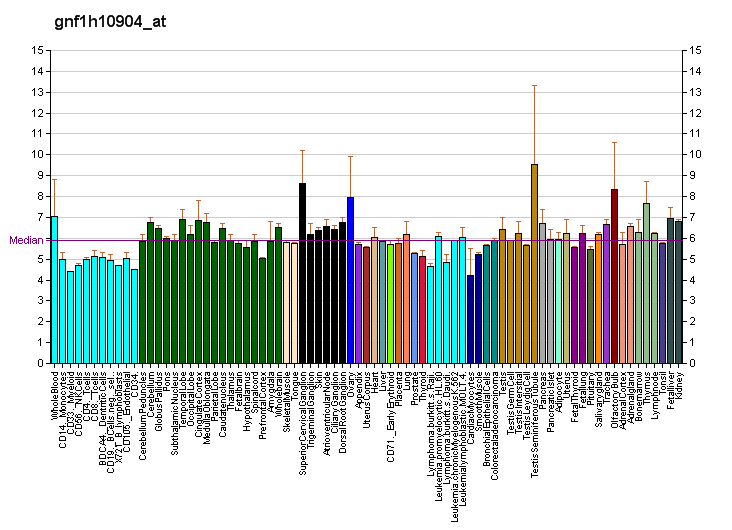
RNA expression pattern
Bgee	Human / Mouse (ortholog); Top expressed in: testicle; epithelium of colon; monocyte / n/a; More reference expression data
BioGPS	More reference expression data
Gene ontology
Molecular function	G protein-coupled receptor activity; odorant binding; olfactory receptor activity; signal transducer activity
Cellular component	integral component of membrane; plasma membrane; membrane
Biological process	sensory perception of smell; signal transduction; response to stimulus; detection of chemical stimulus involved in sensory perception of smell; G protein-coupled receptor signaling pathway
Sources:Amigo / QuickGO
Orthologs
Databases	NCBI: entry; OMA: entry
Species	Human	Mouse
Entrez	390148	258631
Ensembl	ENSG00000187612	ENSMUSG00000047039
UniProt	Q8NH69	Q8VFQ8
RefSeq (mRNA)	NM_001001960	NM_146638
RefSeq (protein)	NP_001001960	NP_666849
Location (UCSC)	Chr 11: 55.91 – 55.91 Mb	Chr 2: 87.69 – 87.69 Mb
PubMed search
- Wikidata
View/Edit Human	View/Edit Mouse

Olfactory receptor 5W2 is a protein in humans that is encoded by the OR5W2 gene.

== Function ==
Olfactory receptors interact with odorant molecules in the nose to initiate a neuronal response that triggers the perception of smell. The olfactory receptor proteins are members of a large family of G-protein-coupled receptors (GPCRs) arising from single coding-exon genes. Olfactory receptors share a seven-transmembrane domain structure with many neurotransmitter and hormone receptors and are responsible for the recognition and G-protein-mediated transduction of odorant signals. The olfactory receptor gene family is the largest in the human genome. The nomenclature assigned to the olfactory receptor genes and proteins in humans is independent of other organisms.

== See also ==
- Olfactory receptor
