= OR9I1 =

Protein-coding gene in the species Homo sapiens

Identifiers
- Aliases: OR9I1, OR11-228, olfactory receptor family 9 subfamily I member 1
- External IDs: MGI: 3031339; GeneCards: OR9I1

Gene location (Human)
Chr.	Chromosome 11 (human)
Band	11q12.1	Start	58,116,742 bp
Band	11q12.1	End	58,125,530 bp

Gene location (Mouse)
Chr.	Chromosome 19 (mouse)
Band	19|19 A	Start	13,890,894 bp
Band	19|19 A	End	13,899,230 bp
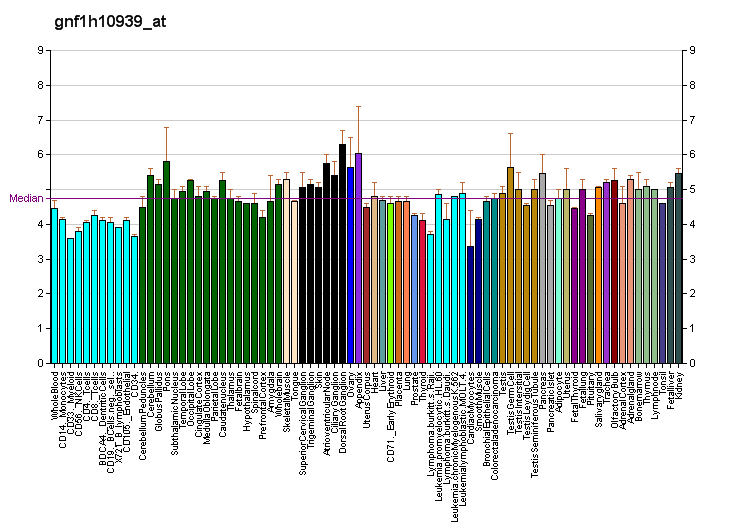
RNA expression pattern
Bgee	Human / Mouse (ortholog); Top expressed in: kidney; body of pancreas; pancreas; multicellular organism / n/a; More reference expression data
BioGPS	More reference expression data
Gene ontology
Molecular function	G protein-coupled receptor activity; odorant binding; olfactory receptor activity; signal transducer activity
Cellular component	integral component of membrane; plasma membrane; membrane
Biological process	sensory perception of smell; signal transduction; response to stimulus; detection of chemical stimulus involved in sensory perception of smell; G protein-coupled receptor signaling pathway
Sources:Amigo / QuickGO
Orthologs
Databases	NCBI: entry; OMA: entry
Species	Human	Mouse
Entrez	219954	258151
Ensembl	ENSG00000172377	ENSMUSG00000062314
UniProt	Q8NGQ6	Q7TQQ2
RefSeq (mRNA)	NM_001005211	NM_001011850
RefSeq (protein)	NP_001005211	NP_001011850
Location (UCSC)	Chr 11: 58.12 – 58.13 Mb	Chr 19: 13.89 – 13.9 Mb
PubMed search
- Wikidata
View/Edit Human	View/Edit Mouse

Olfactory receptor 9I1 is a protein that in humans is encoded by the OR9I1 gene.

Olfactory receptors interact with odorant molecules in the nose, to initiate a neuronal response that triggers the perception of a smell. The olfactory receptor proteins are members of a large family of G-protein-coupled receptors (GPCR) arising from single coding-exon genes. Olfactory receptors share a 7-transmembrane domain structure with many neurotransmitter and hormone receptors and are responsible for the recognition and G protein-mediated transduction of odorant signals. The olfactory receptor gene family is the largest in the genome. The nomenclature assigned to the olfactory receptor genes and proteins for this organism is independent of other organisms.

== See also ==
- Olfactory receptor
