= OR52M1 =

Protein-coding gene in the species Homo sapiens

Identifiers
- Aliases: OR52M1, OR11-11, OR52M1P, OR52M3P, olfactory receptor family 52 subfamily M member 1
- External IDs: MGI: 3030388; GeneCards: OR52M1

Gene location (Human)
Chr.	Chromosome 11 (human)
Band	11p15.4	Start	4,545,191 bp
Band	11p15.4	End	4,546,144 bp

Gene location (Mouse)
Chr.	Chromosome 7 (mouse)
Band	7|7 E3	Start	102,287,639 bp
Band	7|7 E3	End	102,291,762 bp
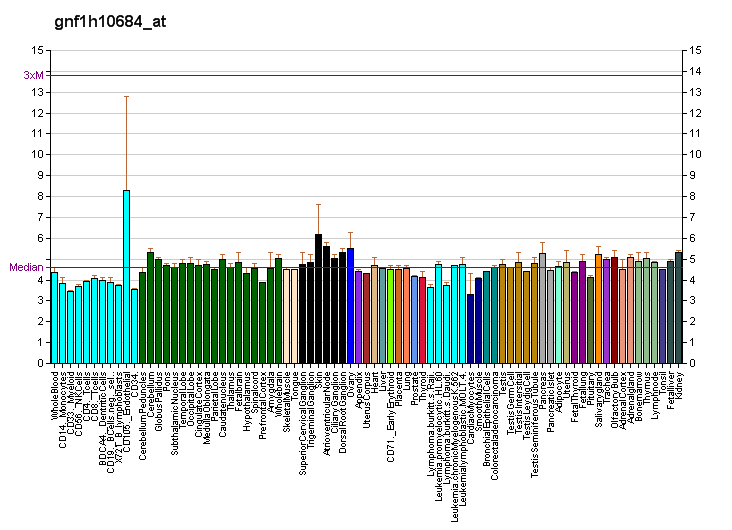
RNA expression pattern
Bgee	Human / Mouse (ortholog); Top expressed in: ganglionic eminence / Top expressed in: testicle; More reference expression data
BioGPS	More reference expression data
Gene ontology
Molecular function	G protein-coupled receptor activity; olfactory receptor activity; signal transducer activity
Cellular component	integral component of membrane; plasma membrane; membrane
Biological process	sensory perception of smell; signal transduction; response to stimulus; detection of chemical stimulus involved in sensory perception of smell; G protein-coupled receptor signaling pathway
Sources:Amigo / QuickGO
Orthologs
Databases	NCBI: entry; OMA: entry
Species	Human	Mouse
Entrez	119772	258322
Ensembl	ENSG00000197790	ENSMUSG00000073971
UniProt	Q8NGK5	E9Q546
RefSeq (mRNA)	NM_001004137	NM_146325
RefSeq (protein)	NP_001004137	NP_666437
Location (UCSC)	Chr 11: 4.55 – 4.55 Mb	Chr 7: 102.29 – 102.29 Mb
PubMed search
- Wikidata
View/Edit Human	View/Edit Mouse

Olfactory receptor 52M1 is a protein that in humans is encoded by the OR52M1 gene.

Olfactory receptors interact with odorant molecules in the nose, to initiate a neuronal response that triggers the perception of a smell. The olfactory receptor proteins are members of a large family of G-protein-coupled receptors (GPCR) arising from single coding-exon genes. Olfactory receptors share a 7-transmembrane domain structure with many neurotransmitter and hormone receptors and are responsible for the recognition and G protein-mediated transduction of odorant signals. The olfactory receptor gene family is the largest in the genome. The nomenclature assigned to the olfactory receptor genes and proteins for this organism is independent of other organisms.

== See also ==
- Olfactory receptor
