= OR5M11 =

Protein-coding gene in the species Homo sapiens

Identifiers
- Aliases: OR5M11, OR11-199, olfactory receptor family 5 subfamily M member 11
- External IDs: MGI: 3030863; GeneCards: OR5M11

Gene location (Human)
Chr.	Chromosome 11 (human)
Band	11q12.1	Start	56,542,340 bp
Band	11q12.1	End	56,543,257 bp

Gene location (Mouse)
Chr.	Chromosome 2 (mouse)
Band	2|2 D	Start	85,804,239 bp
Band	2|2 D	End	85,809,257 bp
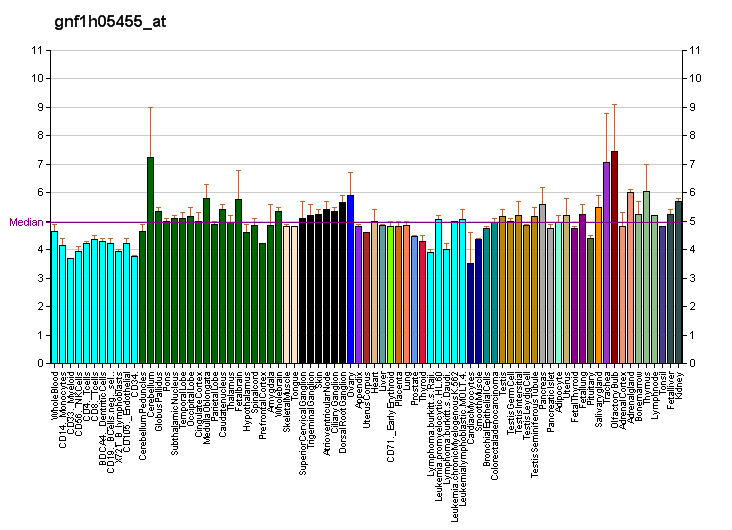
RNA expression pattern
Bgee	Human / Mouse (ortholog); Top expressed in: urinary bladder; right testis / Top expressed in: ovary; liver; More reference expression data
BioGPS	More reference expression data
Gene ontology
Molecular function	G protein-coupled receptor activity; odorant binding; olfactory receptor activity; signal transducer activity
Cellular component	integral component of membrane; plasma membrane; membrane
Biological process	sensory perception of smell; signal transduction; response to stimulus; detection of chemical stimulus involved in sensory perception of smell; G protein-coupled receptor signaling pathway
Sources:Amigo / QuickGO
Orthologs
Databases	NCBI: entry; OMA: entry
Species	Human	Mouse
Entrez	219487	258154
Ensembl	ENSG00000255223	ENSMUSG00000059873
UniProt	Q96RB7	A2ATE0
RefSeq (mRNA)	NM_001005245	NM_001011852
RefSeq (protein)	NP_001005245	NP_001011852
Location (UCSC)	Chr 11: 56.54 – 56.54 Mb	Chr 2: 85.8 – 85.81 Mb
PubMed search
- Wikidata
View/Edit Human	View/Edit Mouse

Olfactory receptor 5M11 is a protein that in humans is encoded by the OR5M11 gene.

Olfactory receptors interact with odorant molecules in the nose, to initiate a neuronal response that triggers the perception of a smell. The olfactory receptor proteins are members of a large family of G-protein-coupled receptors (GPCR) arising from single coding-exon genes. Olfactory receptors share a 7-transmembrane domain structure with many neurotransmitter and hormone receptors and are responsible for the recognition and G protein-mediated transduction of odorant signals. The olfactory receptor gene family is the largest in the genome. The nomenclature assigned to the olfactory receptor genes and proteins for this organism is independent of other organisms.

== See also ==
- Olfactory receptor
