= OR11G2 =

Protein-coding gene in the species Homo sapiens

Identifiers
- Aliases: OR11G2, OR14-34, olfactory receptor family 11 subfamily G member 2
- External IDs: MGI: 3030578; GeneCards: OR11G2

Gene location (Human)
Chr.	Chromosome 14 (human)
Band	14q11.2	Start	20,190,896 bp
Band	14q11.2	End	20,201,075 bp

Gene location (Mouse)
Chr.	Chromosome 14 (mouse)
Band	14|14 C1	Start	50,852,336 bp
Band	14|14 C1	End	50,857,296 bp
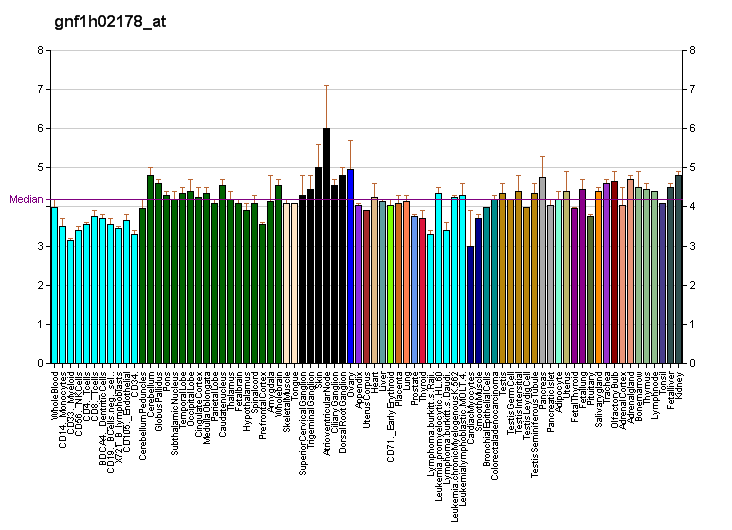
RNA expression pattern
Bgee	Human / Mouse (ortholog); Top expressed in: testicle; blood; muscle of thigh / n/a; More reference expression data
BioGPS	More reference expression data
Gene ontology
Molecular function	olfactory receptor activity; signal transducer activity; G protein-coupled receptor activity
Cellular component	integral component of membrane; plasma membrane; membrane
Biological process	sensory perception of smell; detection of chemical stimulus involved in sensory perception of smell; signal transduction; response to stimulus; G protein-coupled receptor signaling pathway
Sources:Amigo / QuickGO
Orthologs
Databases	NCBI: entry; OMA: entry
Species	Human	Mouse
Entrez	390439	257884
Ensembl	ENSG00000196832	ENSMUSG00000053815
UniProt	Q8NGC1	Q7TRM0
RefSeq (mRNA)	NM_001005503; NM_001386033	NM_001011738
RefSeq (protein)	NP_001005503	NP_001011738
Location (UCSC)	Chr 14: 20.19 – 20.2 Mb	Chr 14: 50.85 – 50.86 Mb
PubMed search
- Wikidata
View/Edit Human	View/Edit Mouse

Olfactory receptor 11G2 is a protein that in humans is encoded by the OR11G2 gene.

Olfactory receptors interact with odorant molecules in the nose, to initiate a neuronal response that triggers the perception of a smell. The olfactory receptor proteins are members of a large family of G-protein-coupled receptors (GPCR) arising from single coding-exon genes. Olfactory receptors share a 7-transmembrane domain structure with many neurotransmitter and hormone receptors and are responsible for the recognition and G protein-mediated transduction of odorant signals. The olfactory receptor gene family is the largest in the genome. The nomenclature assigned to the olfactory receptor genes and proteins for this organism is independent of other organisms.

== See also ==
- Olfactory receptor
