= OR6T1 =

Protein-coding gene in the species Homo sapiens

Identifiers
- Aliases: OR6T1, OR11-277, olfactory receptor family 6 subfamily T member 1
- External IDs: GeneCards: OR6T1

Gene location (Human)
Chr.	Chromosome 11 (human)
Band	11q24.1	Start	123,942,867 bp
Band	11q24.1	End	123,943,838 bp
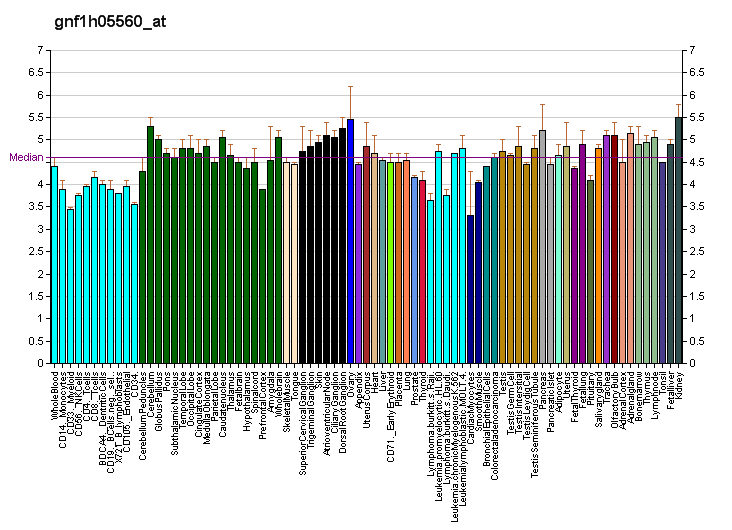
RNA expression pattern
Bgee	Human / Mouse (ortholog); Top expressed in: body of pancreas; rectum; mucosa of transverse colon; islet of Langerhans / n/a; More reference expression data
BioGPS	More reference expression data
Gene ontology
Molecular function	G protein-coupled receptor activity; olfactory receptor activity; signal transducer activity; neurotransmitter receptor activity; G protein-coupled serotonin receptor activity
Cellular component	integral component of membrane; plasma membrane; membrane; integral component of plasma membrane; dendrite
Biological process	sensory perception of smell; detection of chemical stimulus involved in sensory perception of smell; signal transduction; response to stimulus; G protein-coupled serotonin receptor signaling pathway; G protein-coupled receptor signaling pathway; G protein-coupled receptor signaling pathway, coupled to cyclic nucleotide second messenger; chemical synaptic transmission
Sources:Amigo / QuickGO
Orthologs
Databases	NCBI: entry; OMA: entry
Species	Human	Mouse
Entrez	219874	n/a
Ensembl	ENSG00000181499	n/a
UniProt	Q8NGN1	n/a
RefSeq (mRNA)	NM_001005187	n/a
RefSeq (protein)	NP_001005187	n/a
Location (UCSC)	Chr 11: 123.94 – 123.94 Mb	n/a
PubMed search		n/a
- Wikidata
View/Edit Human

Olfactory receptor 6T1 is a protein that in humans is encoded by the OR6T1 gene.

Olfactory receptors interact with odorant molecules in the nose, to initiate a neuronal response that triggers the perception of a smell. The olfactory receptor proteins are members of a large family of G-protein-coupled receptors (GPCR) arising from single coding-exon genes. Olfactory receptors share a 7-transmembrane domain structure with many neurotransmitter and hormone receptors and are responsible for the recognition and G protein-mediated transduction of odorant signals. The olfactory receptor gene family is the largest in the genome. The nomenclature assigned to the olfactory receptor genes and proteins for this organism is independent of other organisms.

== See also ==
- Olfactory receptor
