= OR5B17 =

Protein-coding gene in the species Homo sapiens

Identifiers
- Aliases: OR5B17, OR11-237, OR5B20P, olfactory receptor family 5 subfamily B member 17
- External IDs: MGI: 3031301; GeneCards: OR5B17

Gene location (Human)
Chr.	Chromosome 11 (human)
Band	11q12.1	Start	58,358,124 bp
Band	11q12.1	End	58,359,069 bp

Gene location (Mouse)
Chr.	Chromosome 19 (mouse)
Band	19|19 A	Start	13,339,600 bp
Band	19|19 A	End	13,345,418 bp
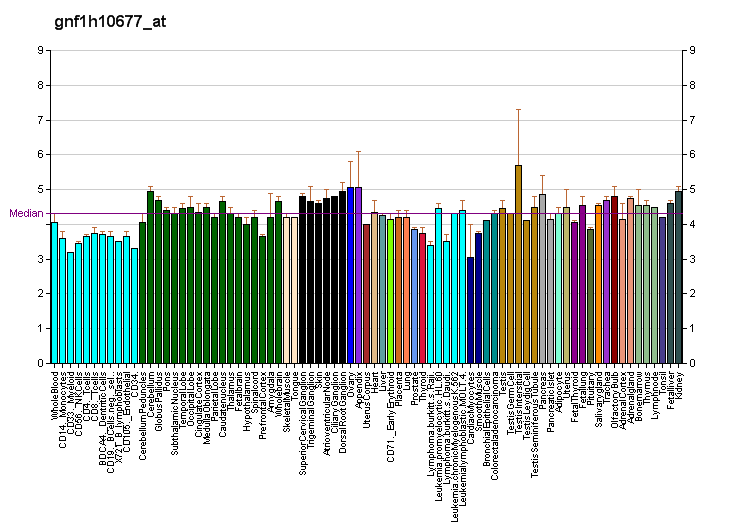
RNA expression pattern
Bgee	Human / Mouse (ortholog); Top expressed in: testicle / Top expressed in: zygote; More reference expression data
BioGPS	More reference expression data
Gene ontology
Molecular function	G protein-coupled receptor activity; odorant binding; olfactory receptor activity; signal transducer activity
Cellular component	integral component of membrane; plasma membrane; membrane
Biological process	sensory perception of smell; signal transduction; response to stimulus; detection of chemical stimulus involved in sensory perception of smell; G protein-coupled receptor signaling pathway
Sources:Amigo / QuickGO
Orthologs
Databases	NCBI: entry; OMA: entry
Species	Human	Mouse
Entrez	219965	258686
Ensembl	ENSG00000197786	ENSMUSG00000049015
UniProt	Q8NGF7	Q8VFW1
RefSeq (mRNA)	NM_001005489	NM_146691
RefSeq (protein)	NP_001005489	NP_666902
Location (UCSC)	Chr 11: 58.36 – 58.36 Mb	Chr 19: 13.34 – 13.35 Mb
PubMed search
- Wikidata
View/Edit Human	View/Edit Mouse

Olfactory receptor 5B17 is a protein that in humans is encoded by the OR5B17 gene.

Olfactory receptors interact with odorant molecules in the nose, to initiate a neuronal response that triggers the perception of a smell. The olfactory receptor proteins are members of a large family of G-protein-coupled receptors (GPCR) arising from single coding-exon genes. Olfactory receptors share a 7-transmembrane domain structure with many neurotransmitter and hormone receptors and are responsible for the recognition and G protein-mediated transduction of odorant signals. The olfactory receptor gene family is the largest in the genome. The nomenclature assigned to the olfactory receptor genes and proteins for this organism is independent of other organisms.

== See also ==
- Olfactory receptor
