= Olfactory receptor 14C36 =

Protein found in humans

OR14C36

Identifiers
- Aliases: OR14C36, OR5BF1, olfactory receptor family 14 subfamily C member 36
- External IDs: MGI: 3030135; GeneCards: OR14C36

Gene location (Human)
Chr.	Chromosome 1 (human)
Band	1q44	Start	248,348,775 bp
Band	1q44	End	248,349,713 bp

Gene location (Mouse)
Chr.	Chromosome 7 (mouse)
Band	7|7 D3	Start	86,053,054 bp
Band	7|7 D3	End	86,063,232 bp
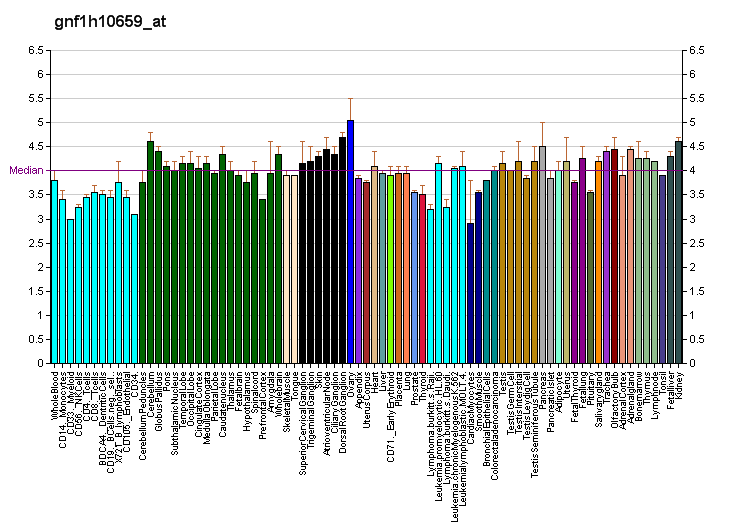
RNA expression pattern
Bgee	Human / Mouse (ortholog); Top expressed in: hypothalamus; tibial nerve; prostate / n/a; More reference expression data
BioGPS	More reference expression data
Gene ontology
Molecular function	G protein-coupled receptor activity; odorant binding; olfactory receptor activity; signal transducer activity
Cellular component	integral component of membrane; plasma membrane; membrane
Biological process	sensory perception of smell; signal transduction; response to stimulus; detection of chemical stimulus involved in sensory perception of smell; G protein-coupled receptor signaling pathway
Sources:Amigo / QuickGO
Orthologs
Databases	NCBI: entry; OMA: entry
Species	Human	Mouse
Entrez	127066	257958
Ensembl	ENSG00000177174	ENSMUSG00000061549
UniProt	Q8NHC7	Q7TS04
RefSeq (mRNA)	NM_001001918	NM_212436
RefSeq (protein)	NP_001001918	NP_997601
Location (UCSC)	Chr 1: 248.35 – 248.35 Mb	Chr 7: 86.05 – 86.06 Mb
PubMed search
- Wikidata
View/Edit Human	View/Edit Mouse

Olfactory receptor 14C36 is a protein that in humans is encoded by the OR14C36 gene.

Olfactory receptors interact with odorant molecules in the nose, to initiate a neuronal response that triggers the perception of a smell. The olfactory receptor proteins are members of a large family of G-protein-coupled receptors (GPCR) arising from single coding-exon genes. Olfactory receptors share a 7-transmembrane domain structure with many neurotransmitter and hormone receptors and are responsible for the recognition and G protein-mediated transduction of odorant signals. The olfactory receptor gene family is the largest in the genome. The nomenclature assigned to the olfactory receptor genes and proteins for this organism is independent of other organisms.

== See also ==
- Olfactory receptor
