= OR52J3 =

Protein-coding gene in the species Homo sapiens

Identifiers
- Aliases: OR52J3, OR11-32, olfactory receptor family 52 subfamily J member 3
- External IDs: MGI: 3030426; GeneCards: OR52J3

Gene location (Human)
Chr.	Chromosome 11 (human)
Band	11p15.4	Start	5,046,526 bp
Band	11p15.4	End	5,047,461 bp

Gene location (Mouse)
Chr.	Chromosome 7 (mouse)
Band	7|7 E3	Start	102,834,010 bp
Band	7|7 E3	End	102,842,172 bp
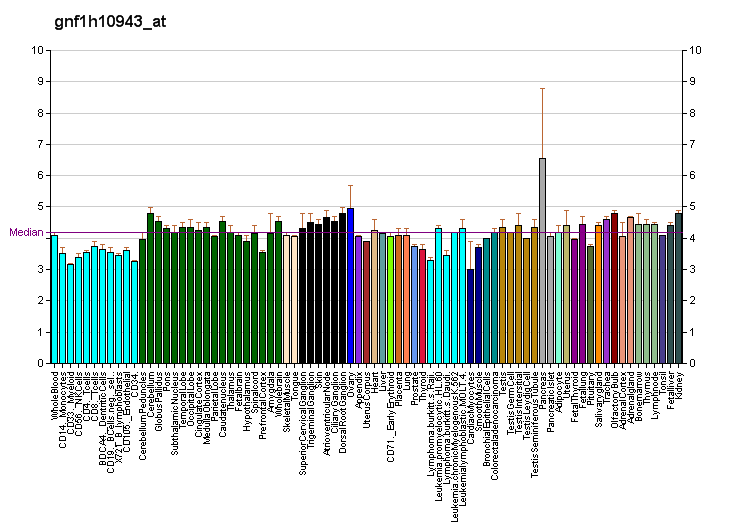
RNA expression pattern
Bgee	Human / Mouse (ortholog); Top expressed in: lung; blood; multicellular organism / n/a; More reference expression data
BioGPS	More reference expression data
Gene ontology
Molecular function	G protein-coupled receptor activity; olfactory receptor activity; signal transducer activity
Cellular component	integral component of membrane; plasma membrane; membrane
Biological process	sensory perception of smell; signal transduction; response to stimulus; detection of chemical stimulus involved in sensory perception of smell; G protein-coupled receptor signaling pathway
Sources:Amigo / QuickGO
Orthologs
Databases	NCBI: entry; OMA: entry
Species	Human	Mouse
Entrez	119679	404317
Ensembl	ENSG00000205495	ENSMUSG00000073956
UniProt	Q8NH60	E9PYB3
RefSeq (mRNA)	NM_001001916	NM_207556
RefSeq (protein)	NP_001001916	NP_997439
Location (UCSC)	Chr 11: 5.05 – 5.05 Mb	Chr 7: 102.83 – 102.84 Mb
PubMed search
- Wikidata
View/Edit Human	View/Edit Mouse

Olfactory receptor 52J3 is a protein that in humans is encoded by the OR52J3 gene.

Olfactory receptors interact with odorant molecules in the nose, to initiate a neuronal response that triggers the perception of a smell. The olfactory receptor proteins are members of a large family of G-protein-coupled receptors (GPCR) arising from single coding-exon genes. Olfactory receptors share a 7-transmembrane domain structure with many neurotransmitter and hormone receptors and are responsible for the recognition and G protein-mediated transduction of odorant signals. The olfactory receptor gene family is the largest in the genome. The nomenclature assigned to the olfactory receptor genes and proteins for this organism is independent of other organisms.

== See also ==
- Olfactory receptor
