= OR52E8 =

Protein-coding gene in the species Homo sapiens

Identifiers
- Aliases: OR52E8, OR11-54, olfactory receptor family 52 subfamily E member 8
- External IDs: MGI: 3030509; GeneCards: OR52E8

Gene location (Human)
Chr.	Chromosome 11 (human)
Band	11p15.4	Start	5,856,749 bp
Band	11p15.4	End	5,857,690 bp

Gene location (Mouse)
Chr.	Chromosome 7 (mouse)
Band	7|7 E3	Start	104,670,577 bp
Band	7|7 E3	End	104,677,667 bp
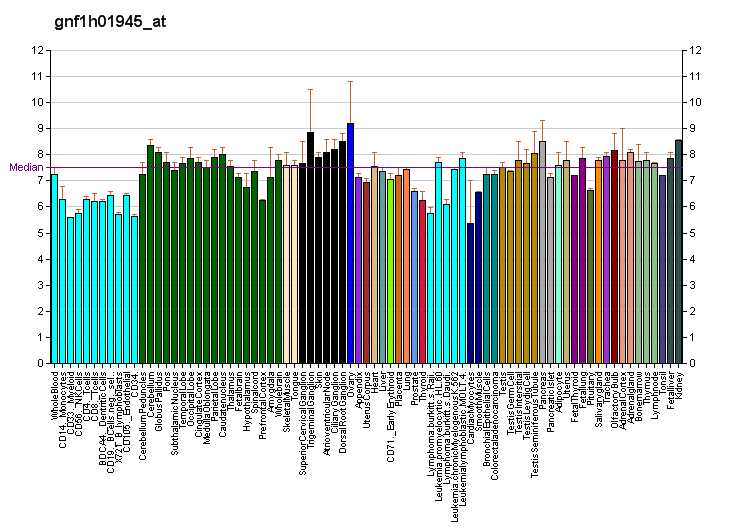
RNA expression pattern
Bgee	Human / Mouse (ortholog); Top expressed in: testicle; gonad / n/a; More reference expression data
BioGPS	More reference expression data
Gene ontology
Molecular function	G protein-coupled receptor activity; signal transducer activity; olfactory receptor activity
Cellular component	integral component of membrane; plasma membrane; membrane
Biological process	response to stimulus; signal transduction; sensory perception of smell; detection of chemical stimulus involved in sensory perception of smell; G protein-coupled receptor signaling pathway
Sources:Amigo / QuickGO
Orthologs
Databases	NCBI: entry; OMA: entry
Species	Human	Mouse
Entrez	390079	258147
Ensembl	ENSG00000183269	ENSMUSG00000096773
UniProt	Q6IFG1	n/a
RefSeq (mRNA)	NM_001005168	NM_001011848
RefSeq (protein)	NP_001005168	n/a
Location (UCSC)	Chr 11: 5.86 – 5.86 Mb	Chr 7: 104.67 – 104.68 Mb
PubMed search
- Wikidata
View/Edit Human	View/Edit Mouse

Olfactory receptor 52E8 is a protein that in humans is encoded by the OR52E8 gene.

Olfactory receptors interact with odorant molecules in the nose, to initiate a neuronal response that triggers the perception of a smell. The olfactory receptor proteins are members of a large family of G-protein-coupled receptors (GPCR) arising from single coding-exon genes. Olfactory receptors share a 7-transmembrane domain structure with many neurotransmitter and hormone receptors and are responsible for the recognition and G protein-mediated transduction of odorant signals. The olfactory receptor gene family is the largest in the genome. The nomenclature assigned to the olfactory receptor genes and proteins for this organism is independent of other organisms.

== See also ==
- Olfactory receptor
