= Olfactory receptor 8U3 =

Protein-coding gene in the species Homo sapiens

OR8U3

Identifiers
- Aliases: OR8U3, OR11-185, OR5R1P, olfactory receptor family 5 subfamily R member 1 (gene/pseudogene), olfactory receptor family 5 subfamily R member 1, OR5R1, olfactory receptor family 8 subfamily U member 3
- External IDs: MGI: 3030872; GeneCards: OR8U3

Gene location (Human)
Chr.	Chromosome 11 (human)
Band	11q12.1	Start	56,417,258 bp
Band	11q12.1	End	56,418,232 bp
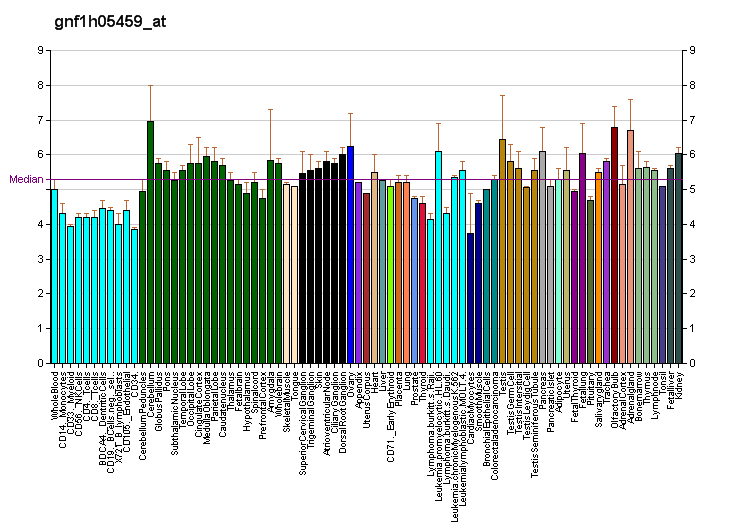
RNA expression pattern
Bgee	Human / Mouse (ortholog); n/a / n/a
BioGPS	More reference expression data
Gene ontology
Molecular function	G protein-coupled receptor activity; odorant binding; olfactory receptor activity; signal transducer activity
Cellular component	integral component of membrane; plasma membrane; membrane
Biological process	sensory perception of smell; signal transduction; response to stimulus; detection of chemical stimulus involved in sensory perception of smell; G protein-coupled receptor signaling pathway
Sources:Amigo / QuickGO
Orthologs
Databases	NCBI: entry; OMA: entry
Species	Human	Mouse
Entrez	219479	259015
Ensembl	ENSG00000279961	ENSMUSG00000050577
UniProt	Q8NH85	Q8VGS1
RefSeq (mRNA)	NM_001004744	NM_147013
RefSeq (protein)	NP_001004744	NP_667224
Location (UCSC)	Chr 11: 56.42 – 56.42 Mb	n/a
PubMed search
- Wikidata
View/Edit Human	View/Edit Mouse

Olfactory receptor 5R1 is a protein that in humans is encoded by the OR5R1 gene.

Olfactory receptors interact with odorant molecules in the nose, to initiate a neuronal response that triggers the perception of a smell. The olfactory receptor proteins are members of a large family of G-protein-coupled receptors (GPCR) arising from single coding-exon genes. Olfactory receptors share a 7-transmembrane domain structure with many neurotransmitter and hormone receptors and are responsible for the recognition and G protein-mediated transduction of odorant signals. The olfactory receptor gene family is the largest in the genome. The nomenclature assigned to the olfactory receptor genes and proteins for this organism is independent of other organisms.

== See also ==
- Olfactory receptor
