= OR7A10 =

Protein-coding gene in the species Homo sapiens

Identifiers
- Aliases: OR7A10, BC85395_3, OR19-18, olfactory receptor family 7 subfamily A member 10
- External IDs: GeneCards: OR7A10

Gene location (Human)
Chr.	Chromosome 19 (human)
Band	19p13.12	Start	14,840,466 bp
Band	19p13.12	End	14,848,922 bp
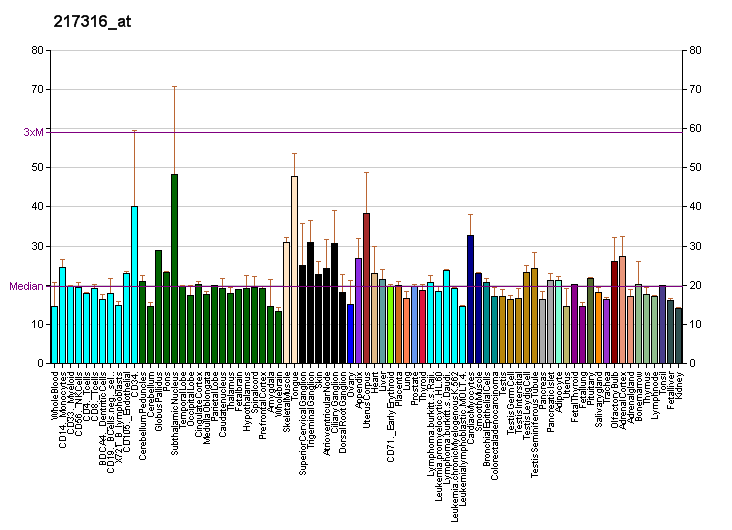
RNA expression pattern
Bgee	Human / Mouse (ortholog); Top expressed in: zone of skin; organ system; adipose tissue; prosencephalon; large intestine; brain; colon; female human reproductive system; prostate; material anatomical entity / n/a; More reference expression data
BioGPS	More reference expression data
Gene ontology
Molecular function	G protein-coupled receptor activity; olfactory receptor activity; signal transducer activity
Cellular component	integral component of membrane; plasma membrane; membrane
Biological process	sensory perception of smell; detection of chemical stimulus involved in sensory perception of smell; signal transduction; response to stimulus; G protein-coupled receptor signaling pathway
Sources:Amigo / QuickGO
Orthologs
Databases	NCBI: entry; OMA: entry
Species	Human	Mouse
Entrez	390892	n/a
Ensembl	ENSG00000127515	n/a
UniProt	O76100	n/a
RefSeq (mRNA)	NM_001005190	n/a
RefSeq (protein)	NP_001005190	n/a
Location (UCSC)	Chr 19: 14.84 – 14.85 Mb	n/a
PubMed search		n/a
- Wikidata
View/Edit Human

Olfactory receptor 7A10 is a protein that in humans is encoded by the OR7A10 gene.

Olfactory receptors interact with odorant molecules in the nose, to initiate a neuronal response that triggers the perception of a smell. The olfactory receptor proteins are members of a large family of G-protein-coupled receptors (GPCR) arising from single coding-exon genes. Olfactory receptors share a 7-transmembrane domain structure with many neurotransmitter and hormone receptors and are responsible for the recognition and G protein-mediated transduction of odorant signals. The olfactory receptor gene family is the largest in the genome. The nomenclature assigned to the olfactory receptor genes and proteins for this organism is independent of other organisms.

== See also ==
- Olfactory receptor
