= OR10R2 =

Protein-coding gene in humans

Identifiers
- Aliases: OR10R2, OR1-8, OR10R2Q, olfactory receptor family 10 subfamily R member 2
- External IDs: GeneCards: OR10R2

Gene location (Human)
Chr.	Chromosome 1 (human)
Band	1q23.1	Start	158,472,220 bp
Band	1q23.1	End	158,480,936 bp
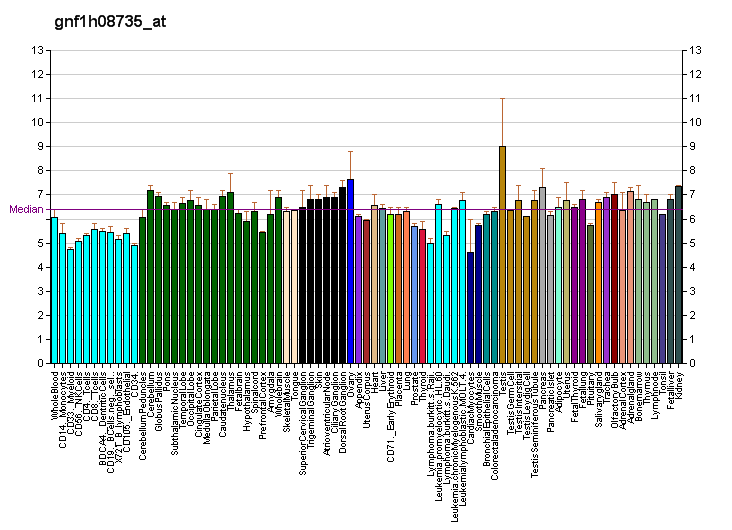
RNA expression pattern
Bgee	Human / Mouse (ortholog); Top expressed in: organ system; thyroid gland; blood; multicellular organism / n/a; More reference expression data
BioGPS	More reference expression data
Gene ontology
Molecular function	G protein-coupled receptor activity; olfactory receptor activity; transmembrane signaling receptor activity; signal transducer activity
Cellular component	integral component of membrane; plasma membrane; membrane
Biological process	sensory perception of smell; detection of chemical stimulus involved in sensory perception of smell; detection of chemical stimulus involved in sensory perception; signal transduction; response to stimulus; G protein-coupled receptor signaling pathway
Sources:Amigo / QuickGO
Orthologs
Databases	NCBI: entry; OMA: entry
Species	Human	Mouse
Entrez	343406	n/a
Ensembl	ENSG00000198965	n/a
UniProt	Q8NGX6	n/a
RefSeq (mRNA)	NM_001004472; NM_001395749	n/a
RefSeq (protein)	NP_001004472	n/a
Location (UCSC)	Chr 1: 158.47 – 158.48 Mb	n/a
PubMed search		n/a
- Wikidata
View/Edit Human

Olfactory receptor 10R2 is a protein that in humans is encoded by the OR10R2 gene.

Olfactory receptors interact with odorant molecules in the nose, to initiate a neuronal response that triggers the perception of a smell. The olfactory receptor proteins are members of a large family of G protein-coupled receptors (GPCR) arising from single coding-exon genes. Olfactory receptors share a 7-transmembrane domain structure with many neurotransmitter and hormone receptors and are responsible for the recognition and G protein-mediated transduction of odorant signals. The olfactory receptor gene family is the largest in the genome. The nomenclature assigned to the olfactory receptor genes and proteins for this organism is independent of other organisms.
