= OR6M1 =

Protein-coding gene in the species Homo sapiens

Identifiers
- Aliases: OR6M1, OR11-271, olfactory receptor family 6 subfamily M member 1
- External IDs: GeneCards: OR6M1

Gene location (Human)
Chr.	Chromosome 11 (human)
Band	11q24.1	Start	123,805,408 bp
Band	11q24.1	End	123,806,349 bp
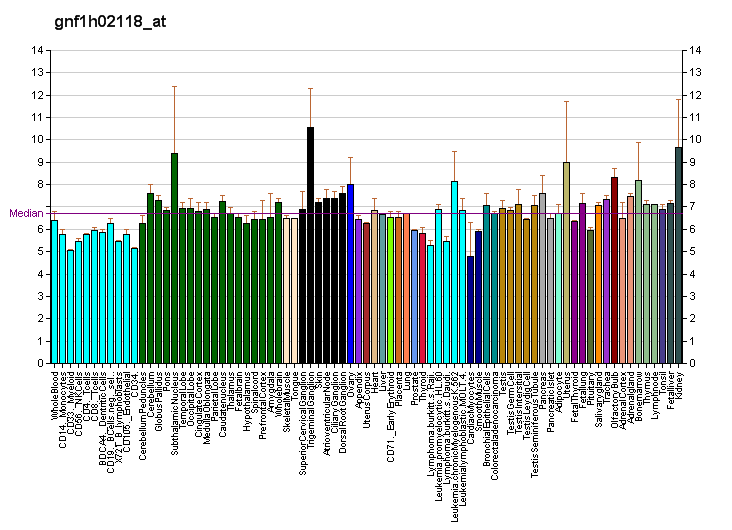
RNA expression pattern
Bgee	Human / Mouse (ortholog); Top expressed in: mucosa of transverse colon; body of pancreas; right lobe of liver; rectum; superior frontal gyrus; placenta / n/a; More reference expression data
BioGPS	More reference expression data
Gene ontology
Molecular function	signal transducer activity; olfactory receptor activity; G protein-coupled receptor activity
Cellular component	plasma membrane; membrane; integral component of membrane
Biological process	sensory perception of smell; signal transduction; detection of chemical stimulus involved in sensory perception of smell; response to stimulus; G protein-coupled receptor signaling pathway
Sources:Amigo / QuickGO
Orthologs
Databases	NCBI: entry; OMA: entry
Species	Human	Mouse
Entrez	390261	n/a
Ensembl	ENSG00000196099	n/a
UniProt	Q8NGM8	n/a
RefSeq (mRNA)	NM_001005325	n/a
RefSeq (protein)	NP_001005325	n/a
Location (UCSC)	Chr 11: 123.81 – 123.81 Mb	n/a
PubMed search		n/a
- Wikidata
View/Edit Human

Olfactory receptor 6M1 is a protein that in humans is encoded by the OR6M1 gene.

Olfactory receptors interact with odorant molecules in the nose, to initiate a neuronal response that triggers the perception of a smell. The olfactory receptor proteins are members of a large family of G-protein-coupled receptors (GPCR) arising from single coding-exon genes. Olfactory receptors share a 7-transmembrane domain structure with many neurotransmitter and hormone receptors and are responsible for the recognition and G protein-mediated transduction of odorant signals. The olfactory receptor gene family is the largest in the genome. The nomenclature assigned to the olfactory receptor genes and proteins for this organism is independent of other organisms.

== See also ==
- Olfactory receptor
