= OR8J3 =

Protein-coding gene in the species Homo sapiens

Identifiers
- Aliases: OR8J3, OR11-173, olfactory receptor family 8 subfamily J member 3
- External IDs: MGI: 3030879; GeneCards: OR8J3

Gene location (Human)
Chr.	Chromosome 11 (human)
Band	11q12.1	Start	56,134,721 bp
Band	11q12.1	End	56,140,201 bp

Gene location (Mouse)
Chr.	Chromosome 2 (mouse)
Band	2|2 D	Start	86,026,254 bp
Band	2|2 D	End	86,033,353 bp
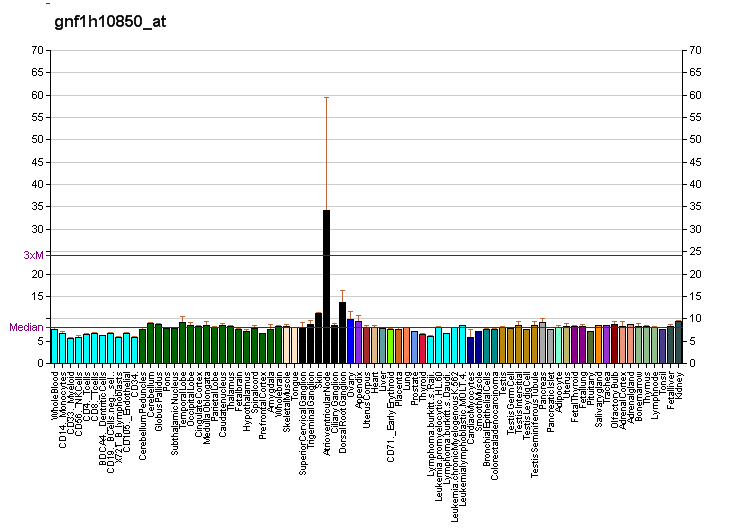
RNA expression pattern
Bgee	Human / Mouse (ortholog); n/a / n/a
BioGPS	More reference expression data
Gene ontology
Molecular function	G protein-coupled receptor activity; odorant binding; signal transducer activity; olfactory receptor activity
Cellular component	integral component of membrane; membrane; plasma membrane
Biological process	sensory perception of smell; signal transduction; response to stimulus; detection of chemical stimulus involved in sensory perception of smell; G protein-coupled receptor signaling pathway
Sources:Amigo / QuickGO
Orthologs
Databases	NCBI: entry; OMA: entry
Species	Human	Mouse
Entrez	81168	259019
Ensembl	ENSG00000167822	ENSMUSG00000075198
UniProt	Q8NGG0	Q7TR80
RefSeq (mRNA)	NM_001004064	NM_147017
RefSeq (protein)	NP_001004064	NP_667228
Location (UCSC)	Chr 11: 56.13 – 56.14 Mb	Chr 2: 86.03 – 86.03 Mb
PubMed search
- Wikidata
View/Edit Human	View/Edit Mouse

Olfactory receptor 8J3 is a protein that in humans is encoded by the OR8J3 gene.

== See also ==
- Olfactory receptor
