= OR14K1 =

Protein-coding gene in humans

Identifiers
- Aliases: OR14K1, OR1-39, OR1.5.9, OR5AY1, olfactory receptor family 14 subfamily K member 1
- External IDs: GeneCards: OR14K1

Gene location (Human)
Chr.	Chromosome 1 (human)
Band	1q44	Start	247,738,615 bp
Band	1q44	End	247,739,559 bp
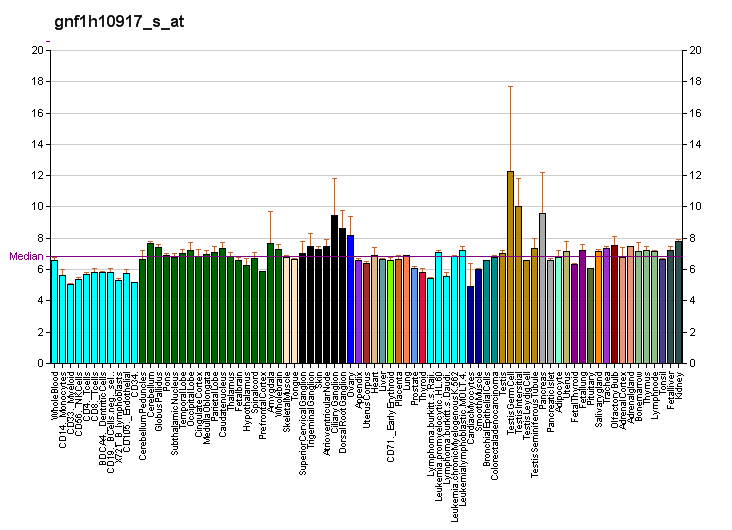
RNA expression pattern
Bgee	Human / Mouse (ortholog); Top expressed in: testicle; bone marrow cell; fallopian tube; thyroid gland / n/a; More reference expression data
BioGPS	More reference expression data
Orthologs
Databases	NCBI: entry; OMA: entry
Species	Human	Mouse
Entrez	343170	n/a
Ensembl	ENSG00000153230	n/a
UniProt	n a	n/a
RefSeq (mRNA)	NM_001004732	n/a
RefSeq (protein)	n/a	n/a
Location (UCSC)	Chr 1: 247.74 – 247.74 Mb	n/a
PubMed search		n/a
- Wikidata
View/Edit Human

Olfactory receptor 14K1 is a protein that in humans is encoded by the OR14K1 gene.

Olfactory receptors interact with odorant molecules in the nose, to initiate a neuronal response that triggers the perception of a smell. The olfactory receptor proteins are members of a large family of G-protein-coupled receptors (GPCR) arising from single coding-exon genes. Olfactory receptors share a 7-transmembrane domain structure with many neurotransmitter and hormone receptors and are responsible for the recognition and G protein-mediated transduction of odorant signals. The olfactory receptor gene family is the largest in the genome. The nomenclature assigned to the olfactory receptor genes and proteins for this organism is independent of other organisms.

== See also ==
- Olfactory receptor
