= PODXL2 =

Protein-coding gene in the species Homo sapiens

Identifiers
- Aliases: PODXL2, EG, PODLX2, podocalyxin like 2
- External IDs: OMIM: 616627; MGI: 2442488; HomoloGene: 9254; GeneCards: PODXL2; OMA:PODXL2 - orthologs

Gene location (Human)
Chr.	Chromosome 3 (human)
Band	3q21.3	Start	127,629,185 bp
Band	3q21.3	End	127,672,802 bp

Gene location (Mouse)
Chr.	Chromosome 6 (mouse)
Band	6|6 D1	Start	88,842,558 bp
Band	6|6 D1	End	88,875,044 bp
RNA expression pattern
Bgee	Human / Mouse (ortholog); Top expressed in: ganglionic eminence; right hemisphere of cerebellum; anterior cingulate cortex; right frontal lobe; ventricular zone; C1 segment; anterior pituitary; prefrontal cortex; Brodmann area 9; nucleus accumbens / Top expressed in: dorsomedial hypothalamic nucleus; superior frontal gyrus; central gray substance of midbrain; primary visual cortex; suprachiasmatic nucleus; cerebellar cortex; neural layer of retina; dorsal tegmental nucleus; lateral hypothalamus; dentate gyrus of hippocampal formation granule cell; More reference expression data
BioGPS	n/a
Gene ontology
Molecular function	glycosaminoglycan binding; protein binding
Cellular component	integral component of membrane; integral component of plasma membrane; membrane; Golgi lumen
Biological process	leukocyte tethering or rolling; cell adhesion
Sources:Amigo / QuickGO
Orthologs
Species	Human	Mouse
Entrez	50512	319655
Ensembl	ENSG00000114631	ENSMUSG00000033152
UniProt	Q9NZ53	Q8CAE9
RefSeq (mRNA)	NM_015720	NM_176973; NM_001347327; NM_001364575
RefSeq (protein)	NP_056535	NP_001334256; NP_795947; NP_001351504; NP_001366146; NP_001366147 NP_001366148; NP_001366149; NP_001366150; NP_001366151; NP_001366152
Location (UCSC)	Chr 3: 127.63 – 127.67 Mb	Chr 6: 88.84 – 88.88 Mb
PubMed search
- Wikidata
View/Edit Human	View/Edit Mouse

Podocalyxin like 2 is a protein that in humans is encoded by the PODXL2 gene.

== Structure ==
This gene is a member of the CD34 family of cell surface transmembrane proteins, which are characterized by an N-terminal extracellular mucin domain, globular and stalk domains, a single pass transmembrane region, and a charged cytoplasmic tail. The encoded protein is a ligand for vascular selectins. [provided by RefSeq, Oct 2012].

== Function ==
Acts as a ligand for vascular selectins. Mediates rapid rolling of leukocytes over vascular surfaces through high affinity divalent cation-dependent interactions with E-, P- and L-selectins
