= OR51B6 =

Protein-coding gene in the species Homo sapiens

Identifiers
- Aliases: OR51B6, HOR5'Beta6, olfactory receptor family 51 subfamily B member 6
- External IDs: MGI: 1341910; GeneCards: OR51B6

Gene location (Human)
| Chr. | Chromosome 11 (human) |
| Band | 11p15.4 | Start | 5,351,508 bp |
| Band | 11p15.4 | End | 5,352,446 bp |

Gene location (Mouse)
| Chr. | Chromosome 7 (mouse) |
| Band | 7|7 E3 | Start | 103,552,694 bp |
| Band | 7|7 E3 | End | 103,557,857 bp |
RNA expression pattern
| Bgee | Human / Mouse (ortholog); Top expressed in: sural nerve; stromal cell of endometrium; bone marrow cell / Top expressed in: respiratory epithelium; nasal epithelium; olfactory epithelium; lumbar subsegment of spinal cord; lumbar spinal ganglion; carotid body; stria vascularis; submandibular gland; thoracic diaphragm; nucleus of stria terminalis; More reference expression data |
| BioGPS | n/a |
Gene ontology
| Molecular function | G protein-coupled receptor activity; olfactory receptor activity; signal transducer activity |
| Cellular component | integral component of membrane; plasma membrane; membrane |
| Biological process | sensory perception of smell; signal transduction; response to stimulus; detection of chemical stimulus involved in sensory perception of smell; G protein-coupled receptor signaling pathway |
Sources:Amigo / QuickGO
Orthologs
| Databases | NCBI: entry; OMA: entry |
| Species | Human | Mouse |
| Entrez | 390058 | 18365 |
| Ensembl | ENSG00000176239 | ENSMUSG00000110259 |
| UniProt | Q9H340 | n/a |
| RefSeq (mRNA) | NM_001004750 | NM_013616 |
| RefSeq (protein) | NP_001004750 | n/a |
| Location (UCSC) | Chr 11: 5.35 – 5.35 Mb | Chr 7: 103.55 – 103.56 Mb |
| PubMed search |
- Wikidata
| View/Edit Human | View/Edit Mouse |

Olfactory receptor 51B6 is a protein that in humans is encoded by the OR51B6 gene.

Olfactory receptors interact with odorant molecules in the nose, to initiate a neuronal response that triggers the perception of a smell. The olfactory receptor proteins are members of a large family of G-protein-coupled receptors (GPCR) arising from single coding-exon genes. Olfactory receptors share a 7-transmembrane domain structure with many neurotransmitter and hormone receptors and are responsible for the recognition and G protein-mediated transduction of odorant signals. The olfactory receptor gene family is the largest in the genome. The nomenclature assigned to the olfactory receptor genes and proteins for this organism is independent of other organisms.

== See also ==
- Olfactory receptor
