= OR13J1 =

Protein-coding gene in the species Homo sapiens

Identifiers
- Aliases: OR13J1, OR9-2, olfactory receptor family 13 subfamily J member 1
- External IDs: MGI: 1860080; GeneCards: OR13J1

Gene location (Human)
Chr.	Chromosome 9 (human)
Band	9p13.3	Start	35,869,463 bp
Band	9p13.3	End	35,870,401 bp

Gene location (Mouse)
Chr.	Chromosome 4 (mouse)
Band	4|4 A5	Start	43,704,562 bp
Band	4|4 A5	End	43,710,255 bp
RNA expression pattern
Bgee	Human / Mouse (ortholog); Top expressed in: prefrontal cortex; primary visual cortex; anterior cingulate cortex; hippocampus proper; right frontal lobe; superior frontal gyrus; putamen; dorsolateral prefrontal cortex; temporal lobe; amygdala / Top expressed in: intestinal villus; Ileal epithelium; perirhinal cortex; entorhinal cortex; choroid plexus of fourth ventricle; CA3 field; lactiferous gland; extraocular muscle; medial ganglionic eminence; tracheobronchial tree; More reference expression data
BioGPS	n/a
Gene ontology
Molecular function	G protein-coupled receptor activity; olfactory receptor activity; signal transducer activity
Cellular component	integral component of membrane; plasma membrane; membrane
Biological process	sensory perception of smell; signal transduction; response to stimulus; detection of chemical stimulus involved in sensory perception of smell; G protein-coupled receptor signaling pathway
Sources:Amigo / QuickGO
Orthologs
Databases	NCBI: entry; OMA: entry
Species	Human	Mouse
Entrez	392309	56015
Ensembl	ENSG00000168828	ENSMUSG00000046450
UniProt	Q8NGT2	Q9QZ18
RefSeq (mRNA)	NM_001004487	NM_019486
RefSeq (protein)	NP_001004487	NP_062359
Location (UCSC)	Chr 9: 35.87 – 35.87 Mb	Chr 4: 43.7 – 43.71 Mb
PubMed search
- Wikidata
View/Edit Human	View/Edit Mouse

Olfactory receptor 13J1 is a protein that in humans is encoded by the OR13J1 gene.

Olfactory receptors interact with odorant molecules in the nose, to initiate a neuronal response that triggers the perception of a smell. The olfactory receptor proteins are members of a large family of G-protein-coupled receptors (GPCR) arising from single coding-exon genes. Olfactory receptors share a 7-transmembrane domain structure with many neurotransmitter and hormone receptors and are responsible for the recognition and G protein-mediated transduction of odorant signals. The olfactory receptor gene family is the largest in the genome. The nomenclature assigned to the olfactory receptor genes and proteins for this organism is independent of other organisms.

== See also ==
- Olfactory receptor
