= OR11A1 =

Protein-coding gene in the species Homo sapiens

Identifiers
- Aliases: OR11A1, 6M1-18, OR11A2, dJ994E9.6, hs6M1-18, olfactory receptor family 11 subfamily A member 1
- External IDs: MGI: 2177479; GeneCards: OR11A1

Gene location (Human)
Chr.	Chromosome 6 (human)
Band	6p22.1	Start	29,425,504 bp
Band	6p22.1	End	29,457,071 bp

Gene location (Mouse)
Chr.	Chromosome 17 (mouse)
Band	17|17 B1	Start	37,531,037 bp
Band	17|17 B1	End	37,537,564 bp
RNA expression pattern
Bgee	Human / Mouse (ortholog); Top expressed in: testicle; right testis; left testis / Top expressed in: blastocyst; respiratory epithelium; peripheral nervous system; nasal epithelium; olfactory epithelium; More reference expression data
BioGPS	n/a
Gene ontology
Molecular function	olfactory receptor activity; signal transducer activity; G protein-coupled receptor activity
Cellular component	integral component of membrane; plasma membrane; membrane
Biological process	sensory perception of smell; detection of chemical stimulus involved in sensory perception of smell; signal transduction; response to stimulus; G protein-coupled receptor signaling pathway
Sources:Amigo / QuickGO
Orthologs
Databases	NCBI: entry; OMA: entry
Species	Human	Mouse
Entrez	26531	258507
Ensembl	ENSG00000237258; ENSG00000230780; ENSG00000232289; ENSG00000234347; ENSG00000223898 ENSG00000206517; ENSG00000206472; ENSG00000204694	ENSMUSG00000064121
UniProt	Q9GZK7	Q8VFE3
RefSeq (mRNA)	NM_013937; NM_001394828; NM_001394829	NM_146514
RefSeq (protein)	NP_039225	NP_666725
Location (UCSC)	Chr 6: 29.43 – 29.46 Mb	Chr 17: 37.53 – 37.54 Mb
PubMed search
- Wikidata
View/Edit Human	View/Edit Mouse

Olfactory receptor 11A1 is a protein that in humans is encoded by the OR11A1 gene.

Olfactory receptors interact with odorant molecules in the nose, to initiate a neuronal response that triggers the perception of a smell. The olfactory receptor proteins are members of a large family of G-protein-coupled receptors (GPCR) arising from single coding-exon genes. Olfactory receptors share a 7-transmembrane domain structure with many neurotransmitter and hormone receptors and are responsible for the recognition and G protein-mediated transduction of odorant signals. The olfactory receptor gene family is the largest in the genome. The nomenclature assigned to the olfactory receptor genes and proteins for this organism is independent of other organisms.

== See also ==
- Olfactory receptor
