= OR10H4 =

Protein-coding gene in the species Homo sapiens

Identifiers
- Aliases: OR10H4, OR19-28, olfactory receptor family 10 subfamily H member 4
- External IDs: MGI: 1335096; GeneCards: OR10H4

Gene location (Human)
Chr.	Chromosome 19 (human)
Band	19p13.12	Start	15,944,299 bp
Band	19p13.12	End	15,950,350 bp

Gene location (Mouse)
Chr.	Chromosome 17 (mouse)
Band	17|17 B1	Start	33,483,650 bp
Band	17|17 B1	End	33,494,618 bp
RNA expression pattern
Bgee	Human / Mouse (ortholog); Top expressed in: left ventricle / n/a; More reference expression data
BioGPS	n/a
Gene ontology
Molecular function	G protein-coupled receptor activity; olfactory receptor activity; signal transducer activity; neurotransmitter receptor activity; G protein-coupled serotonin receptor activity; molecular function
Cellular component	integral component of membrane; plasma membrane; membrane; integral component of plasma membrane; dendrite
Biological process	sensory perception of smell; detection of chemical stimulus involved in sensory perception of smell; signal transduction; response to stimulus; G protein-coupled serotonin receptor signaling pathway; G protein-coupled receptor signaling pathway; biological process; G protein-coupled receptor signaling pathway, coupled to cyclic nucleotide second messenger; chemical synaptic transmission
Sources:Amigo / QuickGO
Orthologs
Databases	NCBI: entry; OMA: entry
Species	Human	Mouse
Entrez	126541	258939
Ensembl	ENSG00000176231	ENSMUSG00000054666
UniProt	Q8NGA5	Q8VBW9
RefSeq (mRNA)	NM_001004465	NM_146937
RefSeq (protein)	NP_001004465	NP_667148
Location (UCSC)	Chr 19: 15.94 – 15.95 Mb	Chr 17: 33.48 – 33.49 Mb
PubMed search
- Wikidata
View/Edit Human	View/Edit Mouse

Olfactory receptor 10H4 is a protein that in humans is encoded by the OR10H4 gene.

== Function ==
Olfactory receptors interact with odorant molecules in the nose, to initiate a neuronal response that triggers the perception of a smell. The olfactory receptor proteins are members of a large family of G-protein-coupled receptors (GPCR) arising from single coding-exon genes. Olfactory receptors share a 7-transmembrane domain structure with many neurotransmitter and hormone receptors and are responsible for the recognition and G protein-mediated transduction of odorant signals. The olfactory receptor gene family is the largest in the genome. The nomenclature assigned to the olfactory receptor genes and proteins for this organism is independent of other organisms.

== See also ==
- Olfactory receptor
