= Olfactory receptor 14J1 =

Protein-coding gene in the species Homo sapiens

OR14J1

Identifiers
- Aliases: OR14J1, OR5U1, OR6-25, bA150A6.4, hs6M1-28, olfactory receptor family 14 subfamily J member 1
- External IDs: MGI: 2177508; GeneCards: OR14J1

Gene location (Human)
Chr.	Chromosome 6 (human)
Band	6p22.1	Start	29,301,701 bp
Band	6p22.1	End	29,313,017 bp

Gene location (Mouse)
Chr.	Chromosome 17 (mouse)
Band	17|17 B1	Start	38,143,840 bp
Band	17|17 B1	End	38,149,381 bp
RNA expression pattern
Bgee	Human / Mouse (ortholog); Top expressed in: testicle; right testis; left testis / Top expressed in: epithelium; body proper; organ system; sensory nervous system; sensory organ; respiratory epithelium; structure with developmental contribution from neural crest; head; nervous system; peripheral nervous system; More reference expression data
BioGPS	n/a
Gene ontology
Molecular function	G protein-coupled receptor activity; odorant binding; olfactory receptor activity; signal transducer activity
Cellular component	integral component of membrane; plasma membrane; membrane
Biological process	sensory perception of smell; signal transduction; response to stimulus; detection of chemical stimulus involved in sensory perception of smell; G protein-coupled receptor signaling pathway
Sources:Amigo / QuickGO
Orthologs
Databases	NCBI: entry; OMA: entry
Species	Human	Mouse
Entrez	442191	258287
Ensembl	ENSG00000204695	ENSMUSG00000050613
UniProt	Q9UGF5	Q14AJ9
RefSeq (mRNA)	NM_030946	NM_146290
RefSeq (protein)	NP_112208	NP_666402
Location (UCSC)	Chr 6: 29.3 – 29.31 Mb	Chr 17: 38.14 – 38.15 Mb
PubMed search
- Wikidata
View/Edit Human	View/Edit Mouse

Olfactory receptor 14J1 is a protein that in humans is encoded by the OR14J1 gene.

Olfactory receptors interact with odorant molecules in the nose, to initiate a neuronal response that triggers the perception of a smell. The olfactory receptor proteins are members of a large family of G-protein-coupled receptors (GPCR) arising from single coding-exon genes. Olfactory receptors share a 7-transmembrane domain structure with many neurotransmitter and hormone receptors and are responsible for the recognition and G protein-mediated transduction of odorant signals. The olfactory receptor gene family is the largest in the genome. The nomenclature assigned to the olfactory receptor genes and proteins for this organism is independent of other organisms.

== See also ==
- Olfactory receptor
