= OR10P1 =

Protein-coding gene in the species Homo sapiens

Identifiers
- Aliases: OR10P1, OR10P1P, OR10P2P, OR10P3P, OR12-7, OST701, olfactory receptor family 10 subfamily P member 1
- External IDs: MGI: 3030630; GeneCards: OR10P1

Gene location (Human)
| Chr. | Chromosome 12 (human) |
| Band | 12q13.2 | Start | 55,636,892 bp |
| Band | 12q13.2 | End | 55,637,833 bp |

Gene location (Mouse)
| Chr. | Chromosome 10 (mouse) |
| Band | 10|10 D3 | Start | 129,441,361 bp |
| Band | 10|10 D3 | End | 129,448,439 bp |
RNA expression pattern
| Bgee | Human / Mouse (ortholog); Top expressed in: right auricle of heart; gonad; blood; left ventricle / n/a; More reference expression data |
| BioGPS | n/a |
Gene ontology
| Molecular function | G protein-coupled receptor activity; olfactory receptor activity; signal transducer activity |
| Cellular component | integral component of membrane; plasma membrane; membrane |
| Biological process | sensory perception of smell; signal transduction; response to stimulus; detection of chemical stimulus involved in sensory perception of smell; G protein-coupled receptor signaling pathway |
Sources:Amigo / QuickGO
Orthologs
| Databases | NCBI: entry; OMA: entry |
| Species | Human | Mouse |
| Entrez | 121130 | 258933 |
| Ensembl | ENSG00000175398 | ENSMUSG00000052012 |
| UniProt | Q8NGE3 | Q8VGJ1 |
| RefSeq (mRNA) | NM_206899 | NM_146931 |
| RefSeq (protein) | NP_996782 | NP_667142 |
| Location (UCSC) | Chr 12: 55.64 – 55.64 Mb | Chr 10: 129.44 – 129.45 Mb |
| PubMed search |
- Wikidata
| View/Edit Human | View/Edit Mouse |

Olfactory receptor 10P1 is a protein that in humans is encoded by the OR10P1 gene.

Olfactory receptors interact with odorant molecules in the nose, to initiate a neuronal response that triggers the perception of a smell. The olfactory receptor proteins are members of a large family of G-protein-coupled receptors (GPCR) arising from single coding-exon genes. Olfactory receptors share a 7-transmembrane domain structure with many neurotransmitter and hormone receptors and are responsible for the recognition and G protein-mediated transduction of odorant signals. The olfactory receptor gene family is the largest in the genome. The nomenclature assigned to the olfactory receptor genes and proteins for this organism is independent of other organisms.

== See also ==
- Olfactory receptor
