= OR8A1 =

Protein-coding gene in the species Homo sapiens

Identifiers
- Aliases: OR8A1, OR11-318, OST025, olfactory receptor family 8 subfamily A member 1
- External IDs: MGI: 1931271; GeneCards: OR8A1

Gene location (Human)
Chr.	Chromosome 11 (human)
Band	11q24.2	Start	124,566,660 bp
Band	11q24.2	End	124,582,942 bp

Gene location (Mouse)
Chr.	Chromosome 9 (mouse)
Band	9|9 A4	Start	37,620,260 bp
Band	9|9 A4	End	37,627,546 bp
RNA expression pattern
Bgee	Human / Mouse (ortholog); Top expressed in: testicle; gonad; Achilles tendon; liver; corpus callosum; placenta; endometrium; blood; right adrenal cortex; prefrontal cortex / Top expressed in: respiratory epithelium; peripheral nervous system; nasal epithelium; olfactory epithelium; More reference expression data
BioGPS	n/a
Gene ontology
Molecular function	G protein-coupled receptor activity; signal transducer activity; olfactory receptor activity; odorant binding
Cellular component	integral component of membrane; plasma membrane; membrane
Biological process	response to stimulus; signal transduction; sensory perception of smell; detection of chemical stimulus involved in sensory perception of smell; G protein-coupled receptor signaling pathway; axon guidance
Sources:Amigo / QuickGO
Orthologs
Databases	NCBI: entry; OMA: entry
Species	Human	Mouse
Entrez	390275	80706
Ensembl	ENSG00000196119	ENSMUSG00000061165
UniProt	Q8NGG7	Q8VGE3
RefSeq (mRNA)	NM_001005194	NM_030553
RefSeq (protein)	NP_001005194	NP_085030
Location (UCSC)	Chr 11: 124.57 – 124.58 Mb	Chr 9: 37.62 – 37.63 Mb
PubMed search
- Wikidata
View/Edit Human	View/Edit Mouse

Olfactory receptor 8A1 is a protein that in humans is encoded by the OR8A1 gene.

Olfactory receptors interact with odorant molecules in the nose, to initiate a neuronal response that triggers the perception of a smell. The olfactory receptor proteins are members of a large family of G-protein-coupled receptors (GPCR) arising from single coding-exon genes. Olfactory receptors share a 7-transmembrane domain structure with many neurotransmitter and hormone receptors and are responsible for the recognition and G protein-mediated transduction of odorant signals. The olfactory receptor gene family is the largest in the genome. The nomenclature assigned to the olfactory receptor genes and proteins for this organism is independent of other organisms.

== See also ==
- Olfactory receptor
