= OR13A1 =

Protein-coding gene in the species Homo sapiens

Identifiers
- Aliases: OR13A1, olfactory receptor family 13 subfamily A member 1
- External IDs: MGI: 3030045; GeneCards: OR13A1

Gene location (Human)
Chr.	Chromosome 10 (human)
Band	10q11.21	Start	45,302,298 bp
Band	10q11.21	End	45,315,608 bp

Gene location (Mouse)
Chr.	Chromosome 6 (mouse)
Band	6|6 E3	Start	116,466,052 bp
Band	6|6 E3	End	116,475,182 bp
RNA expression pattern
Bgee	Human / Mouse (ortholog); Top expressed in: testicle; lymph node; spleen; granulocyte; mucosa of esophagus; blood; urinary bladder; mucosa of transverse colon; cerebellar cortex; cerebellar hemisphere / Top expressed in: respiratory epithelium; nasal epithelium; olfactory epithelium; More reference expression data
BioGPS	n/a
Gene ontology
Molecular function	G protein-coupled receptor activity; odorant binding; olfactory receptor activity; signal transducer activity
Cellular component	integral component of membrane; plasma membrane; membrane
Biological process	sensory perception of smell; signal transduction; response to stimulus; detection of chemical stimulus involved in sensory perception of smell; G protein-coupled receptor signaling pathway
Sources:Amigo / QuickGO
Orthologs
Databases	NCBI: entry; OMA: entry
Species	Human	Mouse
Entrez	79290	258914
Ensembl	ENSG00000277495; ENSG00000256574	ENSMUSG00000053391
UniProt	Q8NGR1	Q8VGH2
RefSeq (mRNA)	NM_001004297	NM_146912
RefSeq (protein)	NP_001004297	NP_667123
Location (UCSC)	Chr 10: 45.3 – 45.32 Mb	Chr 6: 116.47 – 116.48 Mb
PubMed search
- Wikidata
View/Edit Human	View/Edit Mouse

Olfactory receptor 13A1 is a protein that in humans is encoded by the OR13A1 gene.

Olfactory receptors interact with odorant molecules in the nose, to initiate a neuronal response that triggers the perception of a smell. The olfactory receptor proteins are members of a large family of G-protein-coupled receptors (GPCR) arising from single coding-exon genes. Olfactory receptors share a 7-transmembrane domain structure with many neurotransmitter and hormone receptors and are responsible for the recognition and G protein-mediated transduction of odorant signals. The olfactory receptor gene family is the largest in the genome. The nomenclature assigned to the olfactory receptor genes and proteins for this organism is independent of other organisms.

== See also ==
- Olfactory receptor
