= OR10Q1 =

Protein-coding gene in the species Homo sapiens

Identifiers
- Aliases: OR10Q1, OR11-233, olfactory receptor family 10 subfamily Q member 1
- External IDs: MGI: 3031328; GeneCards: OR10Q1

Gene location (Human)
Chr.	Chromosome 11 (human)
Band	11q12.1	Start	58,227,882 bp
Band	11q12.1	End	58,228,918 bp

Gene location (Mouse)
Chr.	Chromosome 19 (mouse)
Band	19|19 A	Start	13,717,092 bp
Band	19|19 A	End	13,727,843 bp
RNA expression pattern
Bgee	Human / Mouse (ortholog); Top expressed in: stromal cell of endometrium; apex of heart; ventricular zone; placenta; skeletal muscle; muscle of leg; gastrocnemius muscle; subcutaneous adipose tissue; lactiferous gland; urinary bladder / Top expressed in: spermatid; More reference expression data
BioGPS	n/a
Gene ontology
Molecular function	signal transducer activity; olfactory receptor activity; G protein-coupled receptor activity; odorant binding
Cellular component	plasma membrane; membrane; integral component of membrane
Biological process	sensory perception of smell; signal transduction; response to stimulus; detection of chemical stimulus involved in sensory perception of smell; G protein-coupled receptor signaling pathway
Sources:Amigo / QuickGO
Orthologs
Databases	NCBI: entry; OMA: entry
Species	Human	Mouse
Entrez	219960	258992
Ensembl	ENSG00000180475	ENSMUSG00000050865
UniProt	Q8NGQ4	Q8VGP8
RefSeq (mRNA)	NM_001004471	NM_146990
RefSeq (protein)	NP_001004471	NP_667201
Location (UCSC)	Chr 11: 58.23 – 58.23 Mb	Chr 19: 13.72 – 13.73 Mb
PubMed search
- Wikidata
View/Edit Human	View/Edit Mouse

Olfactory receptor 10Q1 is a protein that in humans is encoded by the OR10Q1 gene.

Olfactory receptors interact with odorant molecules in the nose, to initiate a neuronal response that triggers the perception of a smell. The olfactory receptor proteins are members of a large family of G-protein-coupled receptors (GPCR) arising from single coding-exon genes. Olfactory receptors share a 7-transmembrane domain structure with many neurotransmitter and hormone receptors and are responsible for the recognition and G protein-mediated transduction of odorant signals. The olfactory receptor gene family is the largest in the genome. The nomenclature assigned to the olfactory receptor genes and proteins for this organism is independent of other organisms.

== See also ==
- Olfactory receptor
