= OR5K2 =

Protein-coding gene in the species Homo sapiens

Identifiers
- Aliases: OR5K2, OR3-9, olfactory receptor family 5 subfamily K member 2
- External IDs: MGI: 3030011; GeneCards: OR5K2

Gene location (Human)
Chr.	Chromosome 3 (human)
Band	3q11.2	Start	98,497,681 bp
Band	3q11.2	End	98,498,631 bp

Gene location (Mouse)
Chr.	Chromosome 16 (mouse)
Band	16|16 C1.2	Start	58,691,318 bp
Band	16|16 C1.2	End	58,695,131 bp
RNA expression pattern
Bgee	Human / Mouse (ortholog); Top expressed in: gonad; popliteal artery; tibial arteries; gastric mucosa; gastrocnemius muscle; left coronary artery; Descending thoracic aorta; muscle layer of sigmoid colon; ascending aorta; right coronary artery / Top expressed in: embryo; More reference expression data
BioGPS	n/a
Gene ontology
Molecular function	G protein-coupled receptor activity; odorant binding; olfactory receptor activity; signal transducer activity
Cellular component	integral component of membrane; plasma membrane; membrane
Biological process	sensory perception of smell; signal transduction; response to stimulus; detection of chemical stimulus involved in sensory perception of smell; G protein-coupled receptor signaling pathway
Sources:Amigo / QuickGO
Orthologs
Databases	NCBI: entry; OMA: entry
Species	Human	Mouse
Entrez	402135	258998
Ensembl	ENSG00000231861	ENSMUSG00000063137
UniProt	Q8NHB8	E9Q7W1
RefSeq (mRNA)	NM_001004737	NM_146996
RefSeq (protein)	NP_001004737	NP_667207
Location (UCSC)	Chr 3: 98.5 – 98.5 Mb	Chr 16: 58.69 – 58.7 Mb
PubMed search
- Wikidata
View/Edit Human	View/Edit Mouse

Olfactory receptor 5K2 is a protein that in humans is encoded by the OR5K2 gene.

Olfactory receptors interact with odorant molecules in the nose, to initiate a neuronal response that triggers the perception of a smell. The olfactory receptor proteins are members of a large family of G-protein-coupled receptors (GPCR) arising from single coding-exon genes. Olfactory receptors share a 7-transmembrane domain structure with many neurotransmitter and hormone receptors and are responsible for the recognition and G protein-mediated transduction of odorant signals. The olfactory receptor gene family is the largest in the genome. The nomenclature assigned to the olfactory receptor genes and proteins for this organism is independent of other organisms.

== See also ==
- Olfactory receptor
