= OR52N4 =

Protein-coding gene in the species Homo sapiens

Identifiers
- Aliases: OR52N4, OR11-64, olfactory receptor family 52 subfamily N member 4 (gene/pseudogene), olfactory receptor family 52 subfamily N member 4
- External IDs: MGI: 3030492; GeneCards: OR52N4

Gene location (Human)
Chr.	Chromosome 11 (human)
Band	11p15.4	Start	5,754,243 bp
Band	11p15.4	End	5,755,958 bp

Gene location (Mouse)
Chr.	Chromosome 7 (mouse)
Band	7|7 E3	Start	104,292,084 bp
Band	7|7 E3	End	104,296,512 bp
RNA expression pattern
Bgee	Human / Mouse (ortholog); Top expressed in: testicle; granulocyte; spleen; right uterine tube; lymph node; tibial nerve; gastric mucosa; right ovary; right coronary artery; left ovary / Top expressed in: embryo; olfactory epithelium; More reference expression data
BioGPS	n/a
Gene ontology
Molecular function	G protein-coupled receptor activity; olfactory receptor activity; signal transducer activity
Cellular component	integral component of membrane; plasma membrane; membrane
Biological process	sensory perception of smell; signal transduction; response to stimulus; detection of chemical stimulus involved in sensory perception of smell; G protein-coupled receptor signaling pathway
Sources:Amigo / QuickGO
Orthologs
Databases	NCBI: entry; OMA: entry
Species	Human	Mouse
Entrez	390072	259051
Ensembl	ENSG00000181074	ENSMUSG00000070421
UniProt	Q8NGI2	n/a
RefSeq (mRNA)	NM_001005175	NM_147049
RefSeq (protein)	NP_001005175	n/a
Location (UCSC)	Chr 11: 5.75 – 5.76 Mb	Chr 7: 104.29 – 104.3 Mb
PubMed search
- Wikidata
View/Edit Human	View/Edit Mouse

Olfactory receptor 52N4 is a protein that in humans is encoded by the OR52N4 gene.

Olfactory receptors interact with odorant molecules in the nose, to initiate a neuronal response that triggers the perception of a smell. The olfactory receptor proteins are members of a large family of G-protein-coupled receptors (GPCR) arising from single coding-exon genes. Olfactory receptors share a 7-transmembrane domain structure with many neurotransmitter and hormone receptors and are responsible for the recognition and G protein-mediated transduction of odorant signals. The olfactory receptor gene family is the largest in the genome. The nomenclature assigned to the olfactory receptor genes and proteins for this organism is independent of other organisms.

== See also ==
- Olfactory receptor
