= OR8H1 =

Protein-coding gene in the species Homo sapiens

Identifiers
- Aliases: OR8H1, OR11-180, olfactory receptor family 8 subfamily H member 1
- External IDs: MGI: 3030933; GeneCards: OR8H1

Gene location (Human)
| Chr. | Chromosome 11 (human) |
| Band | 11q12.1 | Start | 56,288,462 bp |
| Band | 11q12.1 | End | 56,292,254 bp |

Gene location (Mouse)
| Chr. | Chromosome 2 (mouse) |
| Band | 2|2 D | Start | 86,785,470 bp |
| Band | 2|2 D | End | 86,791,037 bp |
RNA expression pattern
| Bgee | Human / Mouse (ortholog); Top expressed in: aorta; ascending aorta / n/a; More reference expression data |
| BioGPS | n/a |
Gene ontology
| Molecular function | G protein-coupled receptor activity; signal transducer activity; olfactory receptor activity; odorant binding |
| Cellular component | integral component of membrane; plasma membrane; membrane |
| Biological process | response to stimulus; signal transduction; sensory perception of smell; detection of chemical stimulus involved in sensory perception of smell; G protein-coupled receptor signaling pathway |
Sources:Amigo / QuickGO
Orthologs
| Databases | NCBI: entry; OMA: entry |
| Species | Human | Mouse |
| Entrez | 219469 | 258764 |
| Ensembl | ENSG00000262611; ENSG00000181693 | ENSMUSG00000075168 |
| UniProt | Q8NGG4 | Q8VG37 |
| RefSeq (mRNA) | NM_001005199 | NM_146768 |
| RefSeq (protein) | NP_001005199 | NP_666979 |
| Location (UCSC) | Chr 11: 56.29 – 56.29 Mb | Chr 2: 86.79 – 86.79 Mb |
| PubMed search |
- Wikidata
| View/Edit Human | View/Edit Mouse |

Olfactory receptor 8H1 is a protein that in humans is encoded by the OR8H1 gene.

Olfactory receptors interact with odorant molecules in the nose, to initiate a neuronal response that triggers the perception of a smell. The olfactory receptor proteins are members of a large family of G-protein-coupled receptors (GPCR) arising from single coding-exon genes. Olfactory receptors share a 7-transmembrane domain structure with many neurotransmitter and hormone receptors and are responsible for the recognition and G protein-mediated transduction of odorant signals. The olfactory receptor gene family is the largest in the genome. The nomenclature assigned to the olfactory receptor genes and proteins for this organism is independent of other organisms.

== See also ==
- Olfactory receptor
