= OR52I1 =

Protein-coding gene in the species Homo sapiens

Identifiers
- Aliases: OR52I1, OR11-13, olfactory receptor family 52 subfamily I member 1
- External IDs: MGI: 3030390; GeneCards: OR52I1

Gene location (Human)
Chr.	Chromosome 11 (human)
Band	11p15.4	Start	4,593,750 bp
Band	11p15.4	End	4,595,013 bp

Gene location (Mouse)
Chr.	Chromosome 7 (mouse)
Band	7|7 E3	Start	102,314,106 bp
Band	7|7 E3	End	102,322,477 bp
RNA expression pattern
Bgee	Human / Mouse (ortholog); Top expressed in: testicle / Top expressed in: epithelium; body proper; organ system; sensory nervous system; respiratory epithelium; sensory organ; structure with developmental contribution from neural crest; nasal epithelium; peripheral nervous system; olfactory epithelium; More reference expression data
BioGPS	n/a
Gene ontology
Molecular function	G protein-coupled receptor activity; olfactory receptor activity; signal transducer activity
Cellular component	integral component of membrane; plasma membrane; membrane
Biological process	sensory perception of smell; signal transduction; response to stimulus; detection of chemical stimulus involved in sensory perception of smell; G protein-coupled receptor signaling pathway
Sources:Amigo / QuickGO
Orthologs
Databases	NCBI: entry; OMA: entry
Species	Human	Mouse
Entrez	390037	258749
Ensembl	ENSG00000232268	ENSMUSG00000073969
UniProt	Q8NGK6	E9Q549
RefSeq (mRNA)	NM_001005169	NM_146754
RefSeq (protein)	NP_001005169	NP_666965
Location (UCSC)	Chr 11: 4.59 – 4.6 Mb	Chr 7: 102.31 – 102.32 Mb
PubMed search
- Wikidata
View/Edit Human	View/Edit Mouse

Olfactory receptor 52I1 is a protein that in humans is encoded by the OR52I1 gene.

Olfactory receptors interact with odorant molecules in the nose, to initiate a neuronal response that triggers the perception of a smell. The olfactory receptor proteins are members of a large family of G-protein-coupled receptors (GPCR) arising from single coding-exon genes. Olfactory receptors share a 7-transmembrane domain structure with many neurotransmitter and hormone receptors and are responsible for the recognition and G protein-mediated transduction of odorant signals. The olfactory receptor gene family is the largest in the genome. The nomenclature assigned to the olfactory receptor genes and proteins for this organism is independent of other organisms.

== See also ==
- Olfactory receptor
