= OR6B2 =

Protein-coding gene in the species Homo sapiens

Identifiers
- Aliases: OR6B2, OR2-1, OR6B2P, olfactory receptor family 6 subfamily B member 2
- External IDs: MGI: 3031250; GeneCards: OR6B2

Gene location (Human)
Chr.	Chromosome 2 (human)
Band	2q37.3	Start	240,029,491 bp
Band	2q37.3	End	240,030,429 bp

Gene location (Mouse)
Chr.	Chromosome 1 (mouse)
Band	1|1 D	Start	92,403,647 bp
Band	1|1 D	End	92,412,835 bp
RNA expression pattern
Bgee	Human / Mouse (ortholog); Top expressed in: tibial nerve; right testis; left testis; left coronary artery; exocrine gland; head; salivary gland; fundus; integument; integument / Top expressed in: primary oocyte; More reference expression data
BioGPS	n/a
Gene ontology
Molecular function	G protein-coupled receptor activity; odorant binding; olfactory receptor activity; signal transducer activity
Cellular component	integral component of membrane; plasma membrane; membrane
Biological process	sensory perception of smell; signal transduction; response to stimulus; detection of chemical stimulus involved in sensory perception of smell; G protein-coupled receptor signaling pathway
Sources:Amigo / QuickGO
Orthologs
Databases	NCBI: entry; OMA: entry
Species	Human	Mouse
Entrez	389090	259040
Ensembl	ENSG00000182083	ENSMUSG00000067064
UniProt	Q6IFH4	Q8VGU4
RefSeq (mRNA)	NM_001005853; NM_001001962	NM_147038
RefSeq (protein)	NP_001005853	NP_667249
Location (UCSC)	Chr 2: 240.03 – 240.03 Mb	Chr 1: 92.4 – 92.41 Mb
PubMed search
- Wikidata
View/Edit Human	View/Edit Mouse

Olfactory receptor 6B2 is a protein that in humans is encoded by the OR6B2 gene.

== Function ==
Olfactory receptors interact with odorant molecules in the nose, to initiate a neuronal response that triggers the perception of a smell. The olfactory receptor proteins are members of a large family of G-protein-coupled receptors (GPCR) arising from single coding-exon genes. Olfactory receptors share a 7-transmembrane domain structure with many neurotransmitter and hormone receptors and are responsible for the recognition and G protein-mediated transduction of odorant signals. The olfactory receptor gene family is the largest in the genome. The nomenclature assigned to the olfactory receptor genes and proteins for this organism is independent of other organisms.

== See also ==
- Olfactory receptor
