= OR56B1 =

Protein-coding gene in the species Homo sapiens

Identifiers
- Aliases: OR56B1, OR11-65, OR56B1P, olfactory receptor family 56 subfamily B member 1
- External IDs: MGI: 3030338; GeneCards: OR56B1

Gene location (Human)
Chr.	Chromosome 11 (human)
Band	11p15.4	Start	5,736,448 bp
Band	11p15.4	End	5,738,523 bp

Gene location (Mouse)
Chr.	Chromosome 7 (mouse)
Band	7|7 E3	Start	108,164,043 bp
Band	7|7 E3	End	108,165,000 bp
RNA expression pattern
Bgee	Human / Mouse (ortholog); Top expressed in: testicle; appendix; lymph node; spleen; Descending thoracic aorta; tibial nerve; canal of the cervix; gallbladder; intestinal epithelium; ectocervix / n/a; More reference expression data
BioGPS	n/a
Gene ontology
Molecular function	G protein-coupled receptor activity; signal transducer activity; olfactory receptor activity
Cellular component	integral component of membrane; membrane; plasma membrane
Biological process	sensory perception of smell; detection of chemical stimulus involved in sensory perception of smell; response to stimulus; signal transduction; G protein-coupled receptor signaling pathway
Sources:Amigo / QuickGO
Orthologs
Databases	NCBI: entry; OMA: entry
Species	Human	Mouse
Entrez	387748	258163
Ensembl	ENSG00000181023	ENSMUSG00000060105
UniProt	Q8NGI3	Q7TRU7
RefSeq (mRNA)	NM_001005180	NM_001011858
RefSeq (protein)	NP_001005180	NP_001011858
Location (UCSC)	Chr 11: 5.74 – 5.74 Mb	Chr 7: 108.16 – 108.17 Mb
PubMed search
- Wikidata
View/Edit Human	View/Edit Mouse

Olfactory receptor 56B1 is a protein that in humans is encoded by the OR56B1 gene.

== Function ==
Olfactory receptors interact with odorant molecules in the nose, to initiate a neuronal response that triggers the perception of a smell. The olfactory receptor proteins are members of a large family of G-protein-coupled receptors (GPCR) arising from single coding-exon genes. Olfactory receptors share a 7-transmembrane domain structure with many neurotransmitter and hormone receptors and are responsible for the recognition and G protein-mediated transduction of odorant signals. The olfactory receptor gene family is the largest in the genome. The nomenclature assigned to the olfactory receptor genes and proteins for this organism is independent of other organisms.

== See also ==
- Olfactory receptor
