= OR52L1 =

Protein-coding gene in the species Homo sapiens

Identifiers
- Aliases: OR52L1, OR11-50, olfactory receptor family 52 subfamily L member 1, olfactory receptor family 52 subfamily L member 1 (gene/pseudogene)
- External IDs: MGI: 3030519; GeneCards: OR52L1

Gene location (Human)
Chr.	Chromosome 11 (human)
Band	11p15.4	Start	5,985,892 bp
Band	11p15.4	End	5,986,985 bp

Gene location (Mouse)
Chr.	Chromosome 7 (mouse)
Band	7|7 E3	Start	104,827,623 bp
Band	7|7 E3	End	104,835,219 bp
RNA expression pattern
Bgee	Human / Mouse (ortholog); Top expressed in: ventricular zone; fundus; body of stomach; left ventricle / Top expressed in: respiratory epithelium; nasal epithelium; olfactory epithelium; More reference expression data
BioGPS	n/a
Gene ontology
Molecular function	G protein-coupled receptor activity; olfactory receptor activity; signal transducer activity
Cellular component	integral component of membrane; plasma membrane; membrane
Biological process	sensory perception of smell; signal transduction; response to stimulus; detection of chemical stimulus involved in sensory perception of smell; G protein-coupled receptor signaling pathway
Sources:Amigo / QuickGO
Orthologs
Databases	NCBI: entry; OMA: entry
Species	Human	Mouse
Entrez	338751	258160
Ensembl	ENSG00000183313	ENSMUSG00000047794
UniProt	Q8NGH7	n/a
RefSeq (mRNA)	NM_001005173	NM_001011857
RefSeq (protein)	NP_001005173	n/a
Location (UCSC)	Chr 11: 5.99 – 5.99 Mb	Chr 7: 104.83 – 104.84 Mb
PubMed search
- Wikidata
View/Edit Human	View/Edit Mouse

Olfactory receptor 52L1 is a protein that in humans is encoded by the OR52L1 gene.

Olfactory receptors interact with odorant molecules in the nose, to initiate a neuronal response that triggers the perception of a smell. The olfactory receptor proteins are members of a large family of G-protein-coupled receptors (GPCR) arising from single coding-exon genes. Olfactory receptors share a 7-transmembrane domain structure with many neurotransmitter and hormone receptors and are responsible for the recognition and G protein-mediated transduction of odorant signals. The olfactory receptor gene family is the largest in the genome. The nomenclature assigned to the olfactory receptor genes and proteins for this organism is independent of other organisms.

== See also ==
- Olfactory receptor
