= OR52N5 =

Protein-coding gene in the species Homo sapiens

Identifiers
- Aliases: OR52N5, OR11-62, OR52N5Q, olfactory receptor family 52 subfamily N member 5
- External IDs: MGI: 3030503; GeneCards: OR52N5

Gene location (Human)
Chr.	Chromosome 11 (human)
Band	11p15.4	Start	5,776,165 bp
Band	11p15.4	End	5,783,355 bp

Gene location (Mouse)
Chr.	Chromosome 7 (mouse)
Band	7|7 E3	Start	104,583,447 bp
Band	7|7 E3	End	104,589,684 bp
RNA expression pattern
Bgee	Human / Mouse (ortholog); Top expressed in: gonad; Achilles tendon; sural nerve; muscle of thigh; placenta; respiratory system; left ventricle; lung; subcutaneous adipose tissue; body of stomach / n/a; More reference expression data
BioGPS	n/a
Gene ontology
Molecular function	G protein-coupled receptor activity; olfactory receptor activity; signal transducer activity
Cellular component	integral component of membrane; plasma membrane; membrane
Biological process	sensory perception of smell; signal transduction; response to stimulus; detection of chemical stimulus involved in sensory perception of smell; G protein-coupled receptor signaling pathway
Sources:Amigo / QuickGO
Orthologs
Databases	NCBI: entry; OMA: entry
Species	Human	Mouse
Entrez	390075	259045
Ensembl	ENSG00000181009	ENSMUSG00000073916
UniProt	Q8NH56	Q8VGU9
RefSeq (mRNA)	NM_001001922; NM_001385662	NM_147043
RefSeq (protein)	NP_001001922	NP_667254
Location (UCSC)	Chr 11: 5.78 – 5.78 Mb	Chr 7: 104.58 – 104.59 Mb
PubMed search
- Wikidata
View/Edit Human	View/Edit Mouse

Olfactory receptor 52N5 is a protein that in humans is encoded by the OR52N5 gene.

Olfactory receptors interact with odorant molecules in the nose, to initiate a neuronal response that triggers the perception of a smell. The olfactory receptor proteins are members of a large family of G-protein-coupled receptors (GPCR) arising from single coding-exon genes. Olfactory receptors share a 7-transmembrane domain structure with many neurotransmitter and hormone receptors and are responsible for the recognition and G protein-mediated transduction of odorant signals. The olfactory receptor gene family is the largest in the genome. The nomenclature assigned to the olfactory receptor genes and proteins for this organism is independent of other organisms.

== See also ==
- Olfactory receptor
