= Serine protease 57 =

Protein-coding gene in the species Homo sapiens

PRSS57

Identifiers
- Aliases: PRSS57, PRSSL1, UNQ782, NSP4, protease, serine 57, serine protease 57
- External IDs: MGI: 1920356; GeneCards: PRSS57
Available structures
PDB	Ortholog search: PDBe RCSB
PDB	List of PDB id codes 4Q7X, 4Q7Y, 4Q7Z, 4Q80

Gene location (Human)
Chr.	Chromosome 19 (human)
Band	19p13.3	Start	685,546 bp
Band	19p13.3	End	695,498 bp

Gene location (Mouse)
Chr.	Chromosome 10 (mouse)
Band	10|10 C1	Start	79,617,308 bp
Band	10|10 C1	End	79,626,795 bp
RNA expression pattern
Bgee	Human / Mouse (ortholog); Top expressed in: bone marrow; bone marrow cell; granulocyte; monocyte; blood; spleen; right lobe of liver; muscle of thigh; upper lobe of left lung; placenta / Top expressed in: granulocyte; bone marrow; thymus; morula; embryo; placenta; urinary bladder; white adipose tissue; hippocampus proper; spleen; More reference expression data
BioGPS	n/a
Gene ontology
Molecular function	peptidase activity; hydrolase activity; serine-type endopeptidase activity; heparin binding; serine-type peptidase activity
Cellular component	extracellular region; azurophil granule lumen; extracellular space
Biological process	proteolysis
Sources:Amigo / QuickGO
Orthologs
Databases	NCBI: entry; OMA: entry
Species	Human	Mouse
Entrez	400668	73106
Ensembl	ENSG00000185198	ENSMUSG00000020323
UniProt	Q6UWY2	Q14B24
RefSeq (mRNA)	NM_001308209; NM_214710	NM_001042710
RefSeq (protein)	NP_001295138; NP_999875	NP_001036175
Location (UCSC)	Chr 19: 0.69 – 0.7 Mb	Chr 10: 79.62 – 79.63 Mb
PubMed search
- Wikidata
View/Edit Human	View/Edit Mouse

Serine protease 57 is a protein that in humans is encoded by the PRSS57 gene.

== Function ==
This gene encodes an arginine-specific serine protease and member of the peptidase S1 family of proteins. The encoded protein may undergo proteolytic activation before storage in azurophil granules, in neutrophil cells of the immune system. Following neutrophil activation, the protease is released into the pericellular environment, where it may play a role in defense against microbial pathogens. [provided by RefSeq, Jul 2016].
