= OR51B4 =

Protein-coding gene in the species Homo sapiens

Identifiers
- Aliases: OR51B4, HOR5'Beta1, olfactory receptor family 51 subfamily B member 4
- External IDs: MGI: 1341906; GeneCards: OR51B4

Gene location (Human)
Chr.	Chromosome 11 (human)
Band	11p15.4	Start	5,301,014 bp
Band	11p15.4	End	5,301,946 bp

Gene location (Mouse)
Chr.	Chromosome 7 (mouse)
Band	7|7 E3	Start	103,528,650 bp
Band	7|7 E3	End	103,535,459 bp
RNA expression pattern
Bgee	Human / Mouse (ortholog); Top expressed in: gonad; right ovary; left ovary; right adrenal gland; fallopian tube; myometrium; right adrenal cortex; body of uterus; ectocervix; muscle of thigh / n/a; More reference expression data
BioGPS	n/a
Gene ontology
Molecular function	G protein-coupled receptor activity; olfactory receptor activity; signal transducer activity
Cellular component	integral component of membrane; plasma membrane; membrane
Biological process	sensory perception of smell; signal transduction; response to stimulus; detection of chemical stimulus involved in sensory perception of smell; G protein-coupled receptor signaling pathway
Sources:Amigo / QuickGO
Orthologs
Databases	NCBI: entry; OMA: entry
Species	Human	Mouse
Entrez	79339	18367
Ensembl	ENSG00000183251	ENSMUSG00000058200
UniProt	Q9Y5P0	F8VQ01
RefSeq (mRNA)	NM_033179	NM_013618
RefSeq (protein)	NP_149419	NP_038646
Location (UCSC)	Chr 11: 5.3 – 5.3 Mb	Chr 7: 103.53 – 103.54 Mb
PubMed search
- Wikidata
View/Edit Human	View/Edit Mouse

Olfactory receptor 51B4 is a protein that in humans is encoded by the OR51B4 gene.

== Function ==
Olfactory receptors interact with odorant molecules in the nose, to initiate a neuronal response that triggers the perception of a smell. The olfactory receptor proteins are members of a large family of G-protein-coupled receptors (GPCR) arising from single coding-exon genes. Olfactory receptors share a 7-transmembrane domain structure with many neurotransmitter and hormone receptors and are responsible for the recognition and G protein-mediated transduction of odorant signals. The olfactory receptor gene family is the largest in the genome. The nomenclature assigned to the olfactory receptor genes and proteins for this organism is independent of other organisms.

== See also ==
- Olfactory receptor
