= OR51I1 =

Protein-coding gene in the species Homo sapiens

Identifiers
- Aliases: OR51I1, olfactory receptor family 51 subfamily I member 1
- External IDs: MGI: 3030474; GeneCards: OR51I1

Gene location (Human)
Chr.	Chromosome 11 (human)
Band	11p15.4	Start	5,440,570 bp
Band	11p15.4	End	5,441,514 bp

Gene location (Mouse)
Chr.	Chromosome 7 (mouse)
Band	7|7 E3	Start	103,667,893 bp
Band	7|7 E3	End	103,674,780 bp
RNA expression pattern
Bgee	Human / Mouse (ortholog); Top expressed in: right uterine tube; respiratory system; subdivision of respiratory system; lower respiratory tract; lung; left uterine tube / Top expressed in: respiratory epithelium; nasal epithelium; olfactory epithelium; More reference expression data
BioGPS	n/a
Gene ontology
Molecular function	G protein-coupled receptor activity; olfactory receptor activity; signal transducer activity
Cellular component	integral component of membrane; plasma membrane; membrane
Biological process	sensory perception of smell; signal transduction; response to stimulus; detection of chemical stimulus involved in sensory perception of smell; G protein-coupled receptor signaling pathway
Sources:Amigo / QuickGO
Orthologs
Databases	NCBI: entry; OMA: entry
Species	Human	Mouse
Entrez	390063	258819
Ensembl	ENSG00000167359	ENSMUSG00000066262
UniProt	Q9H343	E9Q7P5
RefSeq (mRNA)	NM_001005288	NM_146822
RefSeq (protein)	NP_001005288	NP_667033
Location (UCSC)	Chr 11: 5.44 – 5.44 Mb	Chr 7: 103.67 – 103.67 Mb
PubMed search
- Wikidata
View/Edit Human	View/Edit Mouse

Olfactory receptor 51I1 is a protein that in humans is encoded by the OR51I1 gene.

Olfactory receptors interact with odorant molecules in the nose, to initiate a neuronal response that triggers the perception of a smell. The olfactory receptor proteins are members of a large family of G-protein-coupled receptors (GPCR) arising from single coding-exon genes. Olfactory receptors share a 7-transmembrane domain structure with many neurotransmitter and hormone receptors and are responsible for the recognition and G protein-mediated transduction of odorant signals. The olfactory receptor gene family is the largest in the genome. The nomenclature assigned to the olfactory receptor genes and proteins for this organism is independent of other organisms.

== See also ==
- Olfactory receptor
