= OR5C1 =

Protein-coding gene in the species Homo sapiens

Identifiers
- Aliases: OR5C1, OR5C2P, OR9-31, OR9-F, olfactory receptor family 5 subfamily C member 1
- External IDs: MGI: 3030202; GeneCards: OR5C1

Gene location (Human)
Chr.	Chromosome 9 (human)
Band	9q33.2	Start	122,788,933 bp
Band	9q33.2	End	122,789,895 bp

Gene location (Mouse)
Chr.	Chromosome 2 (mouse)
Band	2|2 B	Start	37,216,527 bp
Band	2|2 B	End	37,222,784 bp
RNA expression pattern
Bgee	Human / Mouse (ortholog); Top expressed in: sural nerve / Top expressed in: embryo; respiratory epithelium; nasal epithelium; peripheral nervous system; olfactory epithelium; More reference expression data
BioGPS	n/a
Gene ontology
Molecular function	G protein-coupled receptor activity; odorant binding; olfactory receptor activity; signal transducer activity
Cellular component	integral component of membrane; plasma membrane; membrane
Biological process	sensory perception of smell; signal transduction; response to stimulus; detection of chemical stimulus involved in sensory perception of smell; G protein-coupled receptor signaling pathway
Sources:Amigo / QuickGO
Orthologs
Databases	NCBI: entry; OMA: entry
Species	Human	Mouse
Entrez	392391	258371
Ensembl	ENSG00000148215	ENSMUSG00000049018
UniProt	Q8NGR4	Q8VF22
RefSeq (mRNA)	NM_001001923	NM_146374
RefSeq (protein)	NP_001001923	NP_666486
Location (UCSC)	Chr 9: 122.79 – 122.79 Mb	Chr 2: 37.22 – 37.22 Mb
PubMed search
- Wikidata
View/Edit Human	View/Edit Mouse

Olfactory receptor 5C1 is a protein that in humans is encoded by the OR5C1 gene.

Olfactory receptors interact with odorant molecules in the nose, to initiate a neuronal response that triggers the perception of a smell. The olfactory receptor proteins are members of a large family of G-protein-coupled receptors (GPCR) arising from single coding-exon genes. Olfactory receptors share a 7-transmembrane domain structure with many neurotransmitter and hormone receptors and are responsible for the recognition and G protein-mediated transduction of odorant signals. The olfactory receptor gene family is the largest in the genome. The nomenclature assigned to the olfactory receptor genes and proteins for this organism is independent of other organisms.

== See also ==
- Olfactory receptor
