= OR6N1 =

Protein-coding gene in humans

Identifiers
- Aliases: OR6N1, OR1-22, olfactory receptor family 6 subfamily N member 1
- External IDs: MGI: 3030263; GeneCards: OR6N1

Gene location (Human)
Chr.	Chromosome 1 (human)
Band	1q23.1	Start	158,747,814 bp
Band	1q23.1	End	158,772,195 bp

Gene location (Mouse)
Chr.	Chromosome 1 (mouse)
Band	1|1 H3	Start	173,911,897 bp
Band	1|1 H3	End	173,918,909 bp
RNA expression pattern
Bgee	Human / Mouse (ortholog); Top expressed in: bone marrow; granulocyte; bone marrow cell; blood; monocyte; upper lobe of left lung; right testis; left testis; spleen; right lung / Top expressed in: respiratory epithelium; nasal epithelium; peripheral nervous system; olfactory epithelium; More reference expression data
BioGPS	n/a
Gene ontology
Molecular function	G protein-coupled receptor activity; olfactory receptor activity; signal transducer activity
Cellular component	integral component of membrane; plasma membrane; membrane
Biological process	sensory perception of smell; signal transduction; response to stimulus; detection of chemical stimulus involved in sensory perception of smell; G protein-coupled receptor signaling pathway
Sources:Amigo / QuickGO
Orthologs
Databases	NCBI: entry; OMA: entry
Species	Human	Mouse
Entrez	128372	258717
Ensembl	ENSG00000197403	ENSMUSG00000049528
UniProt	Q8NGY5	n/a
RefSeq (mRNA)	NM_001005185	NM_146722
RefSeq (protein)	NP_001005185	n/a
Location (UCSC)	Chr 1: 158.75 – 158.77 Mb	Chr 1: 173.91 – 173.92 Mb
PubMed search
- Wikidata
View/Edit Human	View/Edit Mouse

Olfactory receptor 6N1 is a protein that in humans is encoded by the OR6N1 gene.

Olfactory receptors interact with odorant molecules in the nose, to initiate a neuronal response that triggers the perception of a smell. The olfactory receptor proteins are members of a large family of G-protein-coupled receptors (GPCR) arising from single coding-exon genes. Olfactory receptors share a 7-transmembrane domain structure with many neurotransmitter and hormone receptors and are responsible for the recognition and G protein-mediated transduction of odorant signals. The olfactory receptor gene family is the largest in the genome. The nomenclature assigned to the olfactory receptor genes and proteins for this organism is independent of other organisms.
