= OR9A4 =

Protein-coding gene in the species Homo sapiens

Identifiers
- Aliases: OR9A4, olfactory receptor family 9 subfamily A member 4
- External IDs: MGI: 3030294; GeneCards: OR9A4

Gene location (Human)
Chr.	Chromosome 7 (human)
Band	7q34	Start	141,916,399 bp
Band	7q34	End	141,920,625 bp

Gene location (Mouse)
Chr.	Chromosome 6 (mouse)
Band	6|6 B1	Start	40,546,421 bp
Band	6|6 B1	End	40,551,277 bp
RNA expression pattern
Bgee	Human / Mouse (ortholog); Top expressed in: testicle; bone marrow; granulocyte; monocyte; right coronary artery; blood; C1 segment / Top expressed in: embryo; secondary oocyte; primary oocyte; granulocyte; zygote; More reference expression data
BioGPS	n/a
Gene ontology
Molecular function	olfactory receptor activity; signal transducer activity; G protein-coupled receptor activity
Cellular component	integral component of membrane; plasma membrane; membrane
Biological process	sensory perception of smell; detection of chemical stimulus involved in sensory perception of smell; signal transduction; response to stimulus; G protein-coupled receptor signaling pathway
Sources:Amigo / QuickGO
Orthologs
Databases	NCBI: entry; OMA: entry
Species	Human	Mouse
Entrez	130075	258381
Ensembl	ENSG00000258083	ENSMUSG00000045514
UniProt	Q8NGU2	Q8VF31
RefSeq (mRNA)	NM_001001656	NM_146383
RefSeq (protein)	NP_001001656	NP_666495
Location (UCSC)	Chr 7: 141.92 – 141.92 Mb	Chr 6: 40.55 – 40.55 Mb
PubMed search
- Wikidata
View/Edit Human	View/Edit Mouse

Olfactory receptor 9A4 is a protein that in humans is encoded by the OR9A4 gene.

Olfactory receptors interact with odorant molecules in the nose, to initiate a neuronal response that triggers the perception of a smell. The olfactory receptor proteins are members of a large family of G-protein-coupled receptors (GPCR) arising from single coding-exon genes. Olfactory receptors share a 7-transmembrane domain structure with many neurotransmitter and hormone receptors and are responsible for the recognition and G protein-mediated transduction of odorant signals. The olfactory receptor gene family is the largest in the genome. The nomenclature assigned to the olfactory receptor genes and proteins for this organism is independent of other organisms.

== See also ==
- Olfactory receptor
