= OR5B2 =

Protein-coding gene in the species Homo sapiens

Identifiers
- Aliases: OR5B2, OR11-240, OST073, olfactory receptor family 5 subfamily B member 2
- External IDs: MGI: 3031285; GeneCards: OR5B2

Gene location (Human)
Chr.	Chromosome 11 (human)
Band	11q12.1	Start	58,421,238 bp
Band	11q12.1	End	58,428,121 bp

Gene location (Mouse)
Chr.	Chromosome 19 (mouse)
Band	19|19 A	Start	12,972,378 bp
Band	19|19 A	End	12,977,781 bp
RNA expression pattern
Bgee	Human / Mouse (ortholog); Top expressed in: Descending thoracic aorta; coronary artery; left coronary artery; human musculoskeletal system; skeletal muscle; muscle of leg / n/a; More reference expression data
BioGPS	n/a
Gene ontology
Molecular function	G protein-coupled receptor activity; odorant binding; olfactory receptor activity; signal transducer activity
Cellular component	integral component of membrane; plasma membrane; membrane
Biological process	sensory perception of smell; signal transduction; response to stimulus; detection of chemical stimulus involved in sensory perception of smell; G protein-coupled receptor signaling pathway
Sources:Amigo / QuickGO
Orthologs
Databases	NCBI: entry; OMA: entry
Species	Human	Mouse
Entrez	390190	258700
Ensembl	ENSG00000172365	ENSMUSG00000046913
UniProt	Q96R09	Q8VFX5
RefSeq (mRNA)	NM_001005566	NM_146705
RefSeq (protein)	NP_001005566	NP_666916
Location (UCSC)	Chr 11: 58.42 – 58.43 Mb	Chr 19: 12.97 – 12.98 Mb
PubMed search
- Wikidata
View/Edit Human	View/Edit Mouse

Olfactory receptor 5B2 is a protein that in humans is encoded by the OR5B2 gene.

Olfactory receptors interact with odorant molecules in the nose, to initiate a neuronal response that triggers the perception of a smell. The olfactory receptor proteins are members of a large family of G-protein-coupled receptors (GPCR) arising from single coding-exon genes. Olfactory receptors share a 7-transmembrane domain structure with many neurotransmitter and hormone receptors and are responsible for the recognition and G protein-mediated transduction of odorant signals. The olfactory receptor gene family is the largest in the genome. The nomenclature assigned to the olfactory receptor genes and proteins for this organism is independent of other organisms.

== See also ==
- Olfactory receptor
