= OR6C2 =

Protein-coding gene in the species Homo sapiens

Identifiers
- Aliases: OR6C2, OR6C67, olfactory receptor family 6 subfamily C member 2
- External IDs: MGI: 3030625; GeneCards: OR6C2

Gene location (Human)
Chr.	Chromosome 12 (human)
Band	12q13.2	Start	55,444,069 bp
Band	12q13.2	End	55,453,347 bp

Gene location (Mouse)
Chr.	Chromosome 10 (mouse)
Band	10|10 D3	Start	129,357,661 bp
Band	10|10 D3	End	129,364,222 bp
RNA expression pattern
Bgee	Human / Mouse (ortholog); Top expressed in: sural nerve; heart; left ventricle; salivary gland; blood; endometrium; esophagus; tibial nerve / n/a; More reference expression data
BioGPS	n/a
Gene ontology
Molecular function	G protein-coupled receptor activity; olfactory receptor activity; signal transducer activity
Cellular component	integral component of membrane; plasma membrane; membrane
Biological process	sensory perception of smell; signal transduction; response to stimulus; detection of chemical stimulus involved in sensory perception of smell; G protein-coupled receptor signaling pathway
Sources:Amigo / QuickGO
Orthologs
Databases	NCBI: entry; OMA: entry
Species	Human	Mouse
Entrez	341416	258932
Ensembl	ENSG00000179695	ENSMUSG00000047626
UniProt	Q9NZP2	Q8VGJ0
RefSeq (mRNA)	NM_054105	NM_146930
RefSeq (protein)	NP_473446	NP_667141
Location (UCSC)	Chr 12: 55.44 – 55.45 Mb	Chr 10: 129.36 – 129.36 Mb
PubMed search
- Wikidata
View/Edit Human	View/Edit Mouse

Olfactory receptor 6C2 is a protein that in humans is encoded by the OR6C2 gene.

Olfactory receptors interact with odorant molecules in the nose, to initiate a neuronal response that triggers the perception of a smell. The olfactory receptor proteins are members of a large family of G-protein-coupled receptors (GPCR) arising from single coding-exon genes. Olfactory receptors share a 7-transmembrane domain structure with many neurotransmitter and hormone receptors and are responsible for the recognition and G protein-mediated transduction of odorant signals. The olfactory receptor gene family is the largest in the genome. The nomenclature assigned to the olfactory receptor genes and proteins for this organism is independent of other organisms.

== See also ==
- Olfactory receptor
