= OR8B12 =

Protein in humans

Identifiers
- Aliases: OR8B12, OR11-317, olfactory receptor family 8 subfamily B member 12
- External IDs: MGI: 3030708; GeneCards: OR8B12

Gene location (Human)
Chr.	Chromosome 11 (human)
Band	11q24.2	Start	124,539,635 bp
Band	11q24.2	End	124,545,333 bp

Gene location (Mouse)
Chr.	Chromosome 9 (mouse)
Band	9|9 A4	Start	37,656,402 bp
Band	9|9 A4	End	37,659,890 bp
RNA expression pattern
Bgee	Human / Mouse (ortholog); Top expressed in: testicle; left testis; right testis / Top expressed in: embryo; secondary oocyte; primary oocyte; spermatid; More reference expression data
BioGPS	n/a
Gene ontology
Molecular function	G protein-coupled receptor activity; odorant binding; olfactory receptor activity; signal transducer activity
Cellular component	integral component of membrane; plasma membrane; membrane
Biological process	sensory perception of smell; signal transduction; response to stimulus; detection of chemical stimulus involved in sensory perception of smell; G protein-coupled receptor signaling pathway
Sources:Amigo / QuickGO
Orthologs
Databases	NCBI: entry; OMA: entry
Species	Human	Mouse
Entrez	219858	258882
Ensembl	ENSG00000170953	ENSMUSG00000063350
UniProt	Q8NGG6	Q7TRE6
RefSeq (mRNA)	NM_001005195	NM_146882
RefSeq (protein)	NP_001005195	NP_667093
Location (UCSC)	Chr 11: 124.54 – 124.55 Mb	Chr 9: 37.66 – 37.66 Mb
PubMed search
- Wikidata
View/Edit Human	View/Edit Mouse

Olfactory receptor 8B12 is a protein that in humans is encoded by the OR8B12 gene.

Olfactory receptors interact with odorant molecules in the nose, to initiate a neuronal response that triggers the perception of a smell. The olfactory receptor proteins are members of a large family of G-protein-coupled receptors (GPCR) arising from single coding-exon genes. Olfactory receptors share a 7-transmembrane domain structure with many neurotransmitter and hormone receptors and are responsible for the recognition and G protein-mediated transduction of odorant signals. The olfactory receptor gene family is the largest in the genome. The nomenclature assigned to the olfactory receptor genes and proteins for this organism is independent of other organisms.

== See also ==
- Olfactory receptor
