= OR6B1 =

Protein-coding gene in the species Homo sapiens

Identifiers
- Aliases: OR6B1, OR7-3, OR7-9, olfactory receptor family 6 subfamily B member 1
- External IDs: MGI: 3030283; GeneCards: OR6B1

Gene location (Human)
Chr.	Chromosome 7 (human)
Band	7q35	Start	144,000,320 bp
Band	7q35	End	144,008,793 bp

Gene location (Mouse)
Chr.	Chromosome 6 (mouse)
Band	6|6 B2.1	Start	42,811,318 bp
Band	6|6 B2.1	End	42,816,450 bp
RNA expression pattern
Bgee	Human / Mouse (ortholog); Top expressed in: placenta; testicle; tonsil; left testis; right testis; stomach / n/a; More reference expression data
BioGPS	n/a
Gene ontology
Molecular function	olfactory receptor activity; signal transducer activity; G protein-coupled receptor activity
Cellular component	membrane; integral component of membrane; plasma membrane
Biological process	sensory perception of smell; signal transduction; response to stimulus; detection of chemical stimulus involved in sensory perception of smell; G protein-coupled receptor signaling pathway
Sources:Amigo / QuickGO
Orthologs
Databases	NCBI: entry; OMA: entry
Species	Human	Mouse
Entrez	135946	259067
Ensembl	ENSG00000221813; ENSG00000284939	ENSMUSG00000049168
UniProt	O95007	n/a
RefSeq (mRNA)	NM_001005281	NM_001356410
RefSeq (protein)	NP_001005281	n/a
Location (UCSC)	Chr 7: 144 – 144.01 Mb	Chr 6: 42.81 – 42.82 Mb
PubMed search
- Wikidata
View/Edit Human	View/Edit Mouse

Olfactory receptor 6B1 is a protein that in humans is encoded by the OR6B1 gene.

Olfactory receptors interact with odorant molecules in the nose, to initiate a neuronal response that triggers the perception of a smell. The olfactory receptor proteins are members of a large family of G-protein-coupled receptors (GPCR) arising from single coding-exon genes. Olfactory receptors share a 7-transmembrane domain structure with many neurotransmitter and hormone receptors and are responsible for the recognition and G protein-mediated transduction of odorant signals. The olfactory receptor gene family is the largest in the genome. The nomenclature assigned to the olfactory receptor genes and proteins for this organism is independent of other organisms.

== See also ==
- Olfactory receptor
