= RASAL3 =

Protein-coding gene in the species Homo sapiens

Identifiers
- Aliases: RASAL3, RAS protein activator like 3
- External IDs: OMIM: 616561; MGI: 2444128; GeneCards: RASAL3

Gene location (Human)
Chr.	Chromosome 19 (human)
Band	19p13.12	Start	15,451,624 bp
Band	19p13.12	End	15,464,544 bp

Gene location (Mouse)
Chr.	Chromosome 17 (mouse)
Band	17|17 B1	Start	32,609,633 bp
Band	17|17 B1	End	32,622,557 bp
RNA expression pattern
Bgee	Human / Mouse (ortholog); Top expressed in: granulocyte; spleen; lymph node; appendix; blood; bone marrow cell; mucosa of ileum; thymus; monocyte; upper lobe of left lung / Top expressed in: thymus; mesenteric lymph nodes; granulocyte; blood; spleen; subcutaneous adipose tissue; spermatocyte; pharynx; embryo; tibiofemoral joint; More reference expression data
BioGPS	n/a
Gene ontology
Molecular function	GTPase activator activity
Cellular component	cytosol; membrane; intrinsic component of the cytoplasmic side of the plasma membrane; cytoplasmic side of membrane; cell cortex; extracellular exosome; cytoplasm
Biological process	regulation of GTPase activity; MAPK cascade; positive regulation of NK T cell proliferation; signal transduction; negative regulation of Ras protein signal transduction; positive regulation of GTPase activity
Sources:Amigo / QuickGO
Orthologs
Databases	NCBI: entry; OMA: entry
Species	Human	Mouse
Entrez	64926	320484
Ensembl	ENSG00000105122	ENSMUSG00000052142
UniProt	Q86YV0	Q8C2K5
RefSeq (mRNA)	NM_022904; NM_001348027; NM_001348028; NM_001400377; NM_001400378 NM_001400379; NM_001400380; NM_001400381	NM_178785; NM_001347343; NM_001374604; NM_001400382
RefSeq (protein)	NP_075055; NP_001334956; NP_001334957	NP_001334272; NP_848900; NP_001361533; NP_001387311
Location (UCSC)	Chr 19: 15.45 – 15.46 Mb	Chr 17: 32.61 – 32.62 Mb
PubMed search
- Wikidata
View/Edit Human	View/Edit Mouse

RAS protein activator like 3 is a protein that in humans is encoded by the RASAL3 gene.
