= OR8B2 =

Protein-coding gene in the species Homo sapiens

Identifiers
- Aliases: OR8B2, OR11-309, OR11-310, olfactory receptor family 8 subfamily B member 2
- External IDs: MGI: 2660712; GeneCards: OR8B2

Gene location (Human)
Chr.	Chromosome 11 (human)
Band	11q24.2	Start	124,382,394 bp
Band	11q24.2	End	124,384,499 bp

Gene location (Mouse)
Chr.	Chromosome 9 (mouse)
Band	9|9 A5.1	Start	38,312,994 bp
Band	9|9 A5.1	End	38,319,293 bp
RNA expression pattern
Bgee	Human / Mouse (ortholog); Top expressed in: testicle; left testis; right testis / n/a; More reference expression data
BioGPS	n/a
Gene ontology
Molecular function	G protein-coupled receptor activity; odorant binding; olfactory receptor activity; signal transducer activity
Cellular component	integral component of membrane; plasma membrane; membrane
Biological process	sensory perception of smell; signal transduction; response to stimulus; detection of chemical stimulus involved in sensory perception of smell; G protein-coupled receptor signaling pathway
Sources:Amigo / QuickGO
Orthologs
Databases	NCBI: entry; OMA: entry
Species	Human	Mouse
Entrez	26595	258869
Ensembl	ENSG00000284680	ENSMUSG00000049098
UniProt	Q96RD0	Q60886
RefSeq (mRNA)	NM_001005468	NM_146869
RefSeq (protein)	NP_001005468	NP_667080
Location (UCSC)	Chr 11: 124.38 – 124.38 Mb	Chr 9: 38.31 – 38.32 Mb
PubMed search
- Wikidata
View/Edit Human	View/Edit Mouse

Olfactory receptor 8B2 is a protein that in humans is encoded by the OR8B2 gene.

Olfactory receptors interact with odorant molecules in the nose, to initiate a neuronal response that triggers the perception of a smell. The olfactory receptor proteins are members of a large family of G-protein-coupled receptors (GPCR) arising from single coding-exon genes. Olfactory receptors share a 7-transmembrane domain structure with many neurotransmitter and hormone receptors and are responsible for the recognition and G protein-mediated transduction of odorant signals. The olfactory receptor gene family is the largest in the genome. The nomenclature assigned to the olfactory receptor genes and proteins for this organism is independent of other organisms.

== See also ==
- Olfactory receptor
