= OR5M1 =

Protein-coding gene in the species Homo sapiens

Identifiers
- Aliases: OR5M1, OR11-208, OST050, olfactory receptor family 5 subfamily M member 1
- External IDs: MGI: 3030857; GeneCards: OR5M1

Gene location (Human)
Chr.	Chromosome 11 (human)
Band	11q12.1	Start	56,609,236 bp
Band	11q12.1	End	56,614,874 bp

Gene location (Mouse)
Chr.	Chromosome 2 (mouse)
Band	2|2 D	Start	85,715,984 bp
Band	2|2 D	End	85,721,557 bp
RNA expression pattern
Bgee	Human / Mouse (ortholog); Top expressed in: testicle / Top expressed in: epiblast; More reference expression data
BioGPS	n/a
Gene ontology
Molecular function	G protein-coupled receptor activity; odorant binding; olfactory receptor activity; signal transducer activity
Cellular component	integral component of membrane; plasma membrane; membrane
Biological process	sensory perception of smell; signal transduction; response to stimulus; detection of chemical stimulus involved in sensory perception of smell; G protein-coupled receptor signaling pathway
Sources:Amigo / QuickGO
Orthologs
Databases	NCBI: entry; OMA: entry
Species	Human	Mouse
Entrez	390168	258580
Ensembl	ENSG00000255012	ENSMUSG00000050128
UniProt	Q8NGP8	A2ASU6
RefSeq (mRNA)	NM_001004740	NM_146587
RefSeq (protein)	NP_001004740	NP_666798
Location (UCSC)	Chr 11: 56.61 – 56.61 Mb	Chr 2: 85.72 – 85.72 Mb
PubMed search
- Wikidata
View/Edit Human	View/Edit Mouse

Olfactory receptor 5M1 is a protein that in humans is encoded by the OR5M1 gene.

Olfactory receptors interact with odorant molecules in the nose, to initiate a neuronal response that triggers the perception of a smell. The olfactory receptor proteins are members of a large family of G-protein-coupled receptors (GPCR) arising from single coding-exon genes. Olfactory receptors share a 7-transmembrane domain structure with many neurotransmitter and hormone receptors and are responsible for the recognition and G protein-mediated transduction of odorant signals. The olfactory receptor gene family is the largest in the genome. The nomenclature assigned to the olfactory receptor genes and proteins for this organism is independent of other organisms.

== See also ==
- Olfactory receptor
