= OR10G8 =

Protein-coding gene in the species Homo sapiens

Identifiers
- Aliases: OR10G8, OR11-274, OR11-282, olfactory receptor family 10 subfamily G member 8
- External IDs: MGI: 3030812; GeneCards: OR10G8

Gene location (Human)
Chr.	Chromosome 11 (human)
Band	11q24.2	Start	124,026,798 bp
Band	11q24.2	End	124,030,634 bp

Gene location (Mouse)
Chr.	Chromosome 9 (mouse)
Band	9|9 A5.1	Start	39,903,409 bp
Band	9|9 A5.1	End	39,906,391 bp
RNA expression pattern
Bgee	Human / Mouse (ortholog); Top expressed in: gonad; sural nerve / n/a; More reference expression data
BioGPS	n/a
Gene ontology
Molecular function	G protein-coupled receptor activity; olfactory receptor activity; signal transducer activity
Cellular component	integral component of membrane; plasma membrane; membrane
Biological process	sensory perception of smell; signal transduction; response to stimulus; detection of chemical stimulus involved in sensory perception of smell; G protein-coupled receptor signaling pathway
Sources:Amigo / QuickGO
Orthologs
Databases	NCBI: entry; OMA: entry
Species	Human	Mouse
Entrez	219869	259109
Ensembl	ENSG00000234560	ENSMUSG00000044292
UniProt	Q8NGN5	E9Q985
RefSeq (mRNA)	NM_001004464	NM_147105
RefSeq (protein)	NP_001004464	NP_667316
Location (UCSC)	Chr 11: 124.03 – 124.03 Mb	Chr 9: 39.9 – 39.91 Mb
PubMed search
- Wikidata
View/Edit Human	View/Edit Mouse

Olfactory receptor 10G8 is a protein that in humans is encoded by the OR10G8 gene.

Olfactory receptors interact with odorant molecules in the nose, to initiate a neuronal response that triggers the perception of a smell. The olfactory receptor proteins are members of a large family of G-protein-coupled receptors (GPCR) arising from single coding-exon genes. Olfactory receptors share a 7-transmembrane domain structure with many neurotransmitter and hormone receptors and are responsible for the recognition and G protein-mediated transduction of odorant signals. The olfactory receptor gene family is the largest in the genome. The nomenclature assigned to the olfactory receptor genes and proteins for this organism is independent of other organisms.

== See also ==
- Olfactory receptor
