= OR5M10 =

Protein-coding gene in the species Homo sapiens

Identifiers
- Aliases: OR5M10, OR11-207, olfactory receptor family 5 subfamily M member 10
- External IDs: MGI: 3030856; GeneCards: OR5M10

Gene location (Human)
Chr.	Chromosome 11 (human)
Band	11q12.1	Start	56,576,774 bp
Band	11q12.1	End	56,577,721 bp

Gene location (Mouse)
Chr.	Chromosome 2 (mouse)
Band	2|2 D	Start	85,698,938 bp
Band	2|2 D	End	85,699,885 bp
RNA expression pattern
Bgee	Human / Mouse (ortholog); Top expressed in: salivary gland; multicellular organism / n/a; More reference expression data
BioGPS	n/a
Gene ontology
Molecular function	G protein-coupled receptor activity; odorant binding; olfactory receptor activity; signal transducer activity
Cellular component	integral component of membrane; plasma membrane; membrane
Biological process	sensory perception of smell; signal transduction; response to stimulus; detection of chemical stimulus involved in sensory perception of smell; G protein-coupled receptor signaling pathway
Sources:Amigo / QuickGO
Orthologs
Databases	NCBI: entry; OMA: entry
Species	Human	Mouse
Entrez	390167	258582
Ensembl	ENSG00000254834	ENSMUSG00000057761
UniProt	Q6IEU7	L7MTT3
RefSeq (mRNA)	NM_001004741	NM_146589
RefSeq (protein)	NP_001004741	NP_666800
Location (UCSC)	Chr 11: 56.58 – 56.58 Mb	Chr 2: 85.7 – 85.7 Mb
PubMed search
- Wikidata
View/Edit Human	View/Edit Mouse

Olfactory receptor 5M10 is a protein that in humans is encoded by the OR5M10 gene.

Olfactory receptors interact with odorant molecules in the nose, to initiate a neuronal response that triggers the perception of a smell. The olfactory receptor proteins are members of a large family of G-protein-coupled receptors (GPCR) arising from single coding-exon genes. Olfactory receptors share a 7-transmembrane domain structure with many neurotransmitter and hormone receptors and are responsible for the recognition and G protein-mediated transduction of odorant signals. The olfactory receptor gene family is the largest in the genome. The nomenclature assigned to the olfactory receptor genes and proteins for this organism is independent of other organisms.

== See also ==
- Olfactory receptor
