= OR9G1 =

Protein-coding gene in the species Homo sapiens

Identifiers
- Aliases: OR9G1, OR9G5, olfactory receptor family 9 subfamily G member 1
- External IDs: MGI: 3030848; GeneCards: OR9G1

Gene location (Human)
Chr.	Chromosome 11 (human)
Band	11q12.1	Start	56,699,095 bp
Band	11q12.1	End	56,703,884 bp

Gene location (Mouse)
Chr.	Chromosome 2 (mouse)
Band	2|2 D	Start	85,603,057 bp
Band	2|2 D	End	85,609,318 bp
RNA expression pattern
Bgee	Human / Mouse (ortholog); Top expressed in: testicle / n/a; More reference expression data
BioGPS	n/a
Gene ontology
Molecular function	olfactory receptor activity; signal transducer activity; G protein-coupled receptor activity
Cellular component	integral component of membrane; plasma membrane; membrane
Biological process	sensory perception of smell; detection of chemical stimulus involved in sensory perception of smell; signal transduction; response to stimulus; G protein-coupled receptor signaling pathway
Sources:Amigo / QuickGO
Orthologs
Databases	NCBI: entry; OMA: entry
Species	Human	Mouse
Entrez	390174	258562
Ensembl	ENSG00000174914; ENSG00000261958	ENSMUSG00000059379
UniProt	Q8NH87	Q7TR95
RefSeq (mRNA)	NM_001005213	NM_146569
RefSeq (protein)	NP_001005213	NP_666780
Location (UCSC)	Chr 11: 56.7 – 56.7 Mb	Chr 2: 85.6 – 85.61 Mb
PubMed search
- Wikidata
View/Edit Human	View/Edit Mouse

Olfactory receptor 9G1 is a protein that in humans is encoded by the OR9G1 gene.

Olfactory receptors interact with odorant molecules in the nose, to initiate a neuronal response that triggers the perception of a smell. The olfactory receptor proteins are members of a large family of G-protein-coupled receptors (GPCR) arising from single coding-exon genes. Olfactory receptors share a 7-transmembrane domain structure with many neurotransmitter and hormone receptors and are responsible for the recognition and G protein-mediated transduction of odorant signals. The olfactory receptor gene family is the largest in the genome. The nomenclature assigned to the olfactory receptor genes and proteins for this organism is independent of other organisms.

== See also ==
- Olfactory receptor
