= OR6C1 =

Protein-coding gene in the species Homo sapiens

Identifiers
- Aliases: OR6C1, OST267, olfactory receptor family 6 subfamily C member 1
- External IDs: MGI: 3030636; GeneCards: OR6C1

Gene location (Human)
Chr.	Chromosome 12 (human)
Band	12q13.2	Start	55,314,343 bp
Band	12q13.2	End	55,322,364 bp

Gene location (Mouse)
Chr.	Chromosome 10 (mouse)
Band	10|10 D3	Start	129,513,552 bp
Band	10|10 D3	End	129,524,038 bp
RNA expression pattern
Bgee	Human / Mouse (ortholog); Top expressed in: multicellular organism / n/a; More reference expression data
BioGPS	n/a
Gene ontology
Molecular function	G protein-coupled receptor activity; olfactory receptor activity; signal transducer activity
Cellular component	integral component of membrane; plasma membrane; membrane
Biological process	sensory perception of smell; detection of chemical stimulus involved in sensory perception of smell; signal transduction; response to stimulus; G protein-coupled receptor signaling pathway
Sources:Amigo / QuickGO
Orthologs
Databases	NCBI: entry; OMA: entry
Species	Human	Mouse
Entrez	390321	258934
Ensembl	ENSG00000205330	ENSMUSG00000093866
UniProt	Q96RD1	Q8VGJ2
RefSeq (mRNA)	NM_001005182	NM_146932
RefSeq (protein)	NP_001005182	NP_667143
Location (UCSC)	Chr 12: 55.31 – 55.32 Mb	Chr 10: 129.51 – 129.52 Mb
PubMed search
- Wikidata
View/Edit Human	View/Edit Mouse

Olfactory receptor 6C1 is a protein that in humans is encoded by the OR6C1 gene.

Olfactory receptors interact with odorant molecules in the nose, to initiate a neuronal response that triggers the perception of a smell. The olfactory receptor proteins are members of a large family of G-protein-coupled receptors (GPCR) arising from single coding-exon genes. Olfactory receptors share a 7-transmembrane domain structure with many neurotransmitter and hormone receptors and are responsible for the recognition and G protein-mediated transduction of odorant signals. The olfactory receptor gene family is the largest in the genome. The nomenclature assigned to the olfactory receptor genes and proteins for this organism is independent of other organisms.

== See also ==
- Olfactory receptor
