= OR52E2 =

Protein-coding gene in the species Homo sapiens

Identifiers
- Aliases: OR52E2, olfactory receptor family 52 subfamily E member 2
- External IDs: MGI: 3030428; GeneCards: OR52E2

Gene location (Human)
Chr.	Chromosome 11 (human)
Band	11p15.4	Start	5,058,650 bp
Band	11p15.4	End	5,059,627 bp

Gene location (Mouse)
Chr.	Chromosome 7 (mouse)
Band	7|7 E3	Start	102,866,203 bp
Band	7|7 E3	End	102,871,520 bp
RNA expression pattern
Bgee	Human / Mouse (ortholog); Top expressed in: testicle / n/a; More reference expression data
BioGPS	n/a
Gene ontology
Molecular function	G protein-coupled receptor activity; olfactory receptor activity; signal transducer activity
Cellular component	integral component of membrane; plasma membrane; membrane
Biological process	sensory perception of smell; signal transduction; response to stimulus; detection of chemical stimulus involved in sensory perception of smell; G protein-coupled receptor signaling pathway
Sources:Amigo / QuickGO
Orthologs
Databases	NCBI: entry; OMA: entry
Species	Human	Mouse
Entrez	119678	258246
Ensembl	ENSG00000176787	ENSMUSG00000073954
UniProt	Q8NGJ4	Q7TRR4
RefSeq (mRNA)	NM_001005164	NM_207143
RefSeq (protein)	NP_001005164	NP_997026
Location (UCSC)	Chr 11: 5.06 – 5.06 Mb	Chr 7: 102.87 – 102.87 Mb
PubMed search
- Wikidata
View/Edit Human	View/Edit Mouse

Olfactory receptor 52E2 is a protein that in humans is encoded by the OR52E2 gene.

Olfactory receptors interact with odorant molecules in the nose, to initiate a neuronal response that triggers the perception of a smell. The olfactory receptor proteins are members of a large family of G-protein-coupled receptors (GPCR) arising from single coding-exon genes. Olfactory receptors share a 7-transmembrane domain structure with many neurotransmitter and hormone receptors and are responsible for the recognition and G protein-mediated transduction of odorant signals. The olfactory receptor gene family is the largest in the genome. The nomenclature assigned to the olfactory receptor genes and proteins for this organism is independent of other organisms.

== See also ==
- Olfactory receptor
