= OR10X1 =

Protein-coding gene in humans

Identifiers
- Aliases: OR10X1, OR1-13, OR1-14, OR10X1P, olfactory receptor family 10 subfamily X member 1 (gene/pseudogene), olfactory receptor family 10 subfamily X member 1
- External IDs: MGI: 3030251; GeneCards: OR10X1

Gene location (Human)
Chr.	Chromosome 1 (human)
Band	1q23.1	Start	158,578,919 bp
Band	1q23.1	End	158,579,899 bp

Gene location (Mouse)
Chr.	Chromosome 1 (mouse)
Band	1|1 H3	Start	174,192,688 bp
Band	1|1 H3	End	174,202,038 bp
Gene ontology
Molecular function	olfactory receptor activity; signal transducer activity; G protein-coupled receptor activity
Cellular component	integral component of membrane; plasma membrane; membrane
Biological process	sensory perception of smell; detection of chemical stimulus involved in sensory perception of smell; signal transduction; response to stimulus; G protein-coupled receptor signaling pathway
Sources:Amigo / QuickGO
Orthologs
Databases	NCBI: entry; OMA: entry
Species	Human	Mouse
Entrez	128367	258238
Ensembl	ENSG00000279111	ENSMUSG00000066672
UniProt	Q8NGY0	F8VQB1
RefSeq (mRNA)	NM_001004477	NM_207137
RefSeq (protein)	NP_001004477	NP_997020
Location (UCSC)	Chr 1: 158.58 – 158.58 Mb	Chr 1: 174.19 – 174.2 Mb
PubMed search
- Wikidata
View/Edit Human	View/Edit Mouse

Olfactory receptor 10X1 is a protein that in humans is encoded by the OR10X1 gene.

Olfactory receptors interact with odorant molecules in the nose, to initiate a neuronal response that triggers the perception of a smell. The olfactory receptor proteins are members of a large family of G-protein-coupled receptors (GPCR) arising from single coding-exon genes. Olfactory receptors share a 7-transmembrane domain structure with many neurotransmitter and hormone receptors and are responsible for the recognition and G protein-mediated transduction of odorant signals. The olfactory receptor gene family is the largest in the genome. The nomenclature assigned to the olfactory receptor genes and proteins for this organism is independent of other organisms.

== See also ==
- Olfactory receptor
