= OR8K3 =

Protein-coding gene in the species Homo sapiens

Identifiers
- Aliases: OR8K3, OR11-181, olfactory receptor family 8 subfamily K member 3 (gene/pseudogene)
- External IDs: MGI: 3030888; GeneCards: OR8K3

Gene location (Human)
Chr.	Chromosome 11 (human)
Band	11q12.1	Start	56,315,144 bp
Band	11q12.1	End	56,320,639 bp

Gene location (Mouse)
Chr.	Chromosome 2 (mouse)
Band	2|2 D	Start	86,162,479 bp
Band	2|2 D	End	86,165,777 bp
Gene ontology
Molecular function	G protein-coupled receptor activity; odorant binding; olfactory receptor activity; signal transducer activity
Cellular component	integral component of membrane; plasma membrane; membrane
Biological process	sensory perception of smell; signal transduction; response to stimulus; detection of chemical stimulus involved in sensory perception of smell; G protein-coupled receptor signaling pathway
Sources:Amigo / QuickGO
Orthologs
Databases	NCBI: entry; OMA: entry
Species	Human	Mouse
Entrez	219473	259021
Ensembl	ENSG00000262755; ENSG00000280314	ENSMUSG00000075190
UniProt	Q8NH51	Q8VGS7
RefSeq (mRNA)	NM_001005202	NM_147019
RefSeq (protein)	NP_001005202	NP_667230
Location (UCSC)	Chr 11: 56.32 – 56.32 Mb	Chr 2: 86.16 – 86.17 Mb
PubMed search
- Wikidata
View/Edit Human	View/Edit Mouse

Olfactory receptor, family 8, subfamily K, member 3, also known as OR8K3, is a protein which in humans is encoded by the OR8K3 gene.

== Function ==
Olfactory receptors interact with odorant molecules in the nose, to initiate a neuronal response that triggers the perception of a smell. The olfactory receptor proteins are members of a large family of G protein-coupled receptors (GPCR) arising from single coding-exon genes. Olfactory receptors share a 7-transmembrane domain structure with many neurotransmitter and hormone receptors and are responsible for the recognition and G protein-mediated transduction of odorant signals. The olfactory receptor gene family is the largest in the genome. The nomenclature assigned to the olfactory receptor genes and proteins for this organism is independent of other organisms.
