= OR6K6 =

Protein-coding gene in humans

Identifiers
- Aliases: OR6K6, OR1-21, olfactory receptor family 6 subfamily K member 6
- External IDs: MGI: 3030065; GeneCards: OR6K6

Gene location (Human)
Chr.	Chromosome 1 (human)
Band	1q23.1	Start	158,754,720 bp
Band	1q23.1	End	158,755,891 bp

Gene location (Mouse)
Chr.	Chromosome 1 (mouse)
Band	1|1 H3	Start	173,940,777 bp
Band	1|1 H3	End	173,948,728 bp
Gene ontology
Molecular function	G protein-coupled receptor activity; olfactory receptor activity; transmembrane signaling receptor activity; signal transducer activity
Cellular component	integral component of membrane; plasma membrane; membrane
Biological process	sensory perception of smell; detection of chemical stimulus involved in sensory perception of smell; detection of chemical stimulus involved in sensory perception; signal transduction; response to stimulus; G protein-coupled receptor signaling pathway
Sources:Amigo / QuickGO
Orthologs
Databases	NCBI: entry; OMA: entry
Species	Human	Mouse
Entrez	128371	404222
Ensembl	ENSG00000180433	ENSMUSG00000046486
UniProt	Q8NGW6	E9Q0M4
RefSeq (mRNA)	NM_001005184	NM_001005520
RefSeq (protein)	NP_001005184	NP_001005520
Location (UCSC)	Chr 1: 158.75 – 158.76 Mb	Chr 1: 173.94 – 173.95 Mb
PubMed search
- Wikidata
View/Edit Human	View/Edit Mouse

Olfactory receptor 6K6 is a protein that in humans is encoded by the OR6K6 gene.

Olfactory receptors interact with odorant molecules in the nose, to initiate a neuronal response that triggers the perception of a smell. The olfactory receptor proteins are members of a large family of G-protein-coupled receptors (GPCR) arising from single coding-exon genes. Olfactory receptors share a 7-transmembrane domain structure with many neurotransmitter and hormone receptors and are responsible for the recognition and G protein-mediated transduction of odorant signals. The olfactory receptor gene family is the largest in the genome. The nomenclature assigned to the olfactory receptor genes and proteins for this organism is independent of other organisms.

== See also ==
- Olfactory receptor
