= OR6Y1 =

Protein-coding gene in humans

Identifiers
- Aliases: OR6Y1, OR1-11, OR6Y2, olfactory receptor family 6 subfamily Y member 1
- External IDs: MGI: 3030054; GeneCards: OR6Y1

Gene location (Human)
Chr.	Chromosome 1 (human)
Band	1q23.1	Start	158,544,550 bp
Band	1q23.1	End	158,554,405 bp

Gene location (Mouse)
Chr.	Chromosome 1 (mouse)
Band	1|1 H3	Start	174,269,648 bp
Band	1|1 H3	End	174,278,843 bp
Gene ontology
Molecular function	G protein-coupled receptor activity; olfactory receptor activity; signal transducer activity
Cellular component	integral component of membrane; plasma membrane; membrane
Biological process	sensory perception of smell; signal transduction; response to stimulus; detection of chemical stimulus involved in sensory perception of smell; G protein-coupled receptor signaling pathway
Sources:Amigo / QuickGO
Orthologs
Databases	NCBI: entry; OMA: entry
Species	Human	Mouse
Entrez	391112	546747
Ensembl	ENSG00000197532	ENSMUSG00000066671
UniProt	Q8NGX8	E9Q050
RefSeq (mRNA)	NM_001005189; NM_001386050	NM_207694
RefSeq (protein)	NP_001005189	NP_997577
Location (UCSC)	Chr 1: 158.54 – 158.55 Mb	Chr 1: 174.27 – 174.28 Mb
PubMed search
- Wikidata
View/Edit Human	View/Edit Mouse

Olfactory receptor 6Y1 is a protein that in humans is encoded by the OR6Y1 gene.

Olfactory receptors interact with odorant molecules in the nose, to initiate a neuronal response that triggers the perception of a smell. The olfactory receptor proteins are members of a large family of G-protein-coupled receptors (GPCR) arising from single coding-exon genes. Olfactory receptors share a 7-transmembrane domain structure with many neurotransmitter and hormone receptors and are responsible for the recognition and G protein-mediated transduction of odorant signals. The olfactory receptor gene family is the largest in the genome. The nomenclature assigned to the olfactory receptor genes and proteins for this organism is independent of other organisms.

== See also ==
- Olfactory receptor
