= PCMTD1 =

Protein-coding gene in humans

Identifiers
- Aliases: PCMTD1, protein-L-isoaspartate (D-aspartate) O-methyltransferase domain containing 1
- External IDs: MGI: 2441773; GeneCards: PCMTD1

Gene location (Human)
Chr.	Chromosome 8 (human)
Band	8q11.23	Start	51,817,575 bp
Band	8q11.23	End	51,899,186 bp

Gene location (Mouse)
Chr.	Chromosome 1 (mouse)
Band	1|1 A1	Start	7,159,144 bp
Band	1|1 A1	End	7,243,852 bp
RNA expression pattern
Bgee	Human / Mouse (ortholog); Top expressed in: tendon of biceps brachii; cardiac muscle tissue of right atrium; myocardium of left ventricle; skin of arm; parotid gland; vastus lateralis muscle; pancreatic epithelial cell; Achilles tendon; amniotic fluid; Skeletal muscle tissue of rectus abdominis / Top expressed in: parotid gland; olfactory tubercle; lacrimal gland; tail of embryo; dorsal striatum; globus pallidus; nucleus accumbens; inferior colliculi; epithelium of lens; intercostal muscle; More reference expression data
BioGPS	n/a
Gene ontology
Molecular function	protein-L-isoaspartate (D-aspartate) O-methyltransferase activity
Cellular component	membrane; cytoplasm
Biological process	methylation; protein methylation
Sources:Amigo / QuickGO
Orthologs
Databases	NCBI: entry; OMA: entry
Species	Human	Mouse
Entrez	115294	319263
Ensembl	ENSG00000168300	ENSMUSG00000051285
UniProt	Q96MG8	P59913
RefSeq (mRNA)	NM_001286782; NM_001286783; NM_052937; NM_001363193	NM_183028
RefSeq (protein)	NP_001273711; NP_001273712; NP_443169; NP_001350122	NP_898849
Location (UCSC)	Chr 8: 51.82 – 51.9 Mb	Chr 1: 7.16 – 7.24 Mb
PubMed search
- Wikidata
View/Edit Human	View/Edit Mouse

Protein-L-isoaspartate O-methyltransferase domain-containing protein 1 is a protein that in humans is encoded by the PCMTD1 gene.
