= OR13C4 =

Protein-coding gene in the species Homo sapiens

Identifiers
- Aliases: OR13C4, HSHTPCRX17, HTPCRX17, OR2K1, OR37F, OR9-7, olfactory receptor family 13 subfamily C member 4
- External IDs: GeneCards: OR13C4

Gene location (Human)
Chr.	Chromosome 9 (human)
Band	9q31.1	Start	104,526,253 bp
Band	9q31.1	End	104,527,209 bp
RNA expression pattern
Bgee	Human / Mouse (ortholog); Top expressed in: liver; kidney; blood; multicellular organism / n/a; More reference expression data
BioGPS	n/a
Gene ontology
Molecular function	G protein-coupled receptor activity; olfactory receptor activity; signal transducer activity
Cellular component	integral component of membrane; plasma membrane; membrane
Biological process	sensory perception of smell; signal transduction; response to stimulus; detection of chemical stimulus involved in sensory perception of smell; G protein-coupled receptor signaling pathway
Sources:Amigo / QuickGO
Orthologs
Databases	NCBI: entry; OMA: entry
Species	Human	Mouse
Entrez	138804	n/a
Ensembl	ENSG00000148136	n/a
UniProt	Q8NGS5	n/a
RefSeq (mRNA)	NM_001001919	n/a
RefSeq (protein)	NP_001001919	n/a
Location (UCSC)	Chr 9: 104.53 – 104.53 Mb	n/a
PubMed search		n/a
- Wikidata
View/Edit Human

Olfactory receptor 13C4 is a protein that in humans is encoded by the OR13C4 gene.

Olfactory receptors interact with odorant molecules in the nose, to initiate a neuronal response that triggers the perception of a smell. The olfactory receptor proteins are members of a large family of G-protein-coupled receptors (GPCR) arising from single coding-exon genes. Olfactory receptors share a 7-transmembrane domain structure with many neurotransmitter and hormone receptors and are responsible for the recognition and G protein-mediated transduction of odorant signals. The olfactory receptor gene family is the largest in the genome. The nomenclature assigned to the olfactory receptor genes and proteins for this organism is independent of other organisms.

== See also ==
- Olfactory receptor
