= Podocan like 1 =

Protein-coding gene in the species Homo sapiens

PODNL1

Identifiers
- Aliases: PODNL1, SLRR5B, podocan-like 1, podocan like 1
- External IDs: MGI: 2685352; GeneCards: PODNL1

Gene location (Human)
Chr.	Chromosome 19 (human)
Band	19p13.12	Start	13,931,187 bp
Band	19p13.12	End	13,953,392 bp

Gene location (Mouse)
Chr.	Chromosome 8 (mouse)
Band	8|8 C2	Start	84,852,618 bp
Band	8|8 C2	End	84,859,156 bp
RNA expression pattern
Bgee	Human / Mouse (ortholog); Top expressed in: tibial nerve; right coronary artery; apex of heart; placenta; ascending aorta; left coronary artery; sural nerve; testicle; skin of leg; skin of abdomen / Top expressed in: embryo; embryo; ovary; spleen; jejunum; bone marrow; thymus; ileum; colon; duodenum; More reference expression data
BioGPS	n/a
Gene ontology
Molecular function	protein kinase inhibitor activity
Cellular component	cytoplasm; extracellular region; extracellular matrix; collagen-containing extracellular matrix
Biological process	negative regulation of protein kinase activity; cytokine-mediated signaling pathway; negative regulation of receptor signaling pathway via JAK-STAT
Sources:Amigo / QuickGO
Orthologs
Databases	NCBI: entry; OMA: entry
Species	Human	Mouse
Entrez	79883	244550
Ensembl	ENSG00000132000; ENSG00000288195	ENSMUSG00000012889
UniProt	Q6PEZ8	Q6P3Y9
RefSeq (mRNA)	NM_001146254; NM_001146255; NM_024825; NM_001370095	NM_001013384
RefSeq (protein)	NP_001139726; NP_001139727; NP_079101; NP_001357024	NP_001013402
Location (UCSC)	Chr 19: 13.93 – 13.95 Mb	Chr 8: 84.85 – 84.86 Mb
PubMed search
- Wikidata
View/Edit Human	View/Edit Mouse

Podocan like 1 is a protein that in humans is encoded by the PODNL1 gene.
