= OR11H1 =

Protein-coding gene in the species Homo sapiens

Identifiers
- Aliases: OR11H1, OR22-1, OR11H12, olfactory receptor family 11 subfamily H member 1
- External IDs: GeneCards: OR11H1

Gene location (Human)
Chr.	Chromosome 22 (human)
Band	22q11.1	Start	15,528,192 bp
Band	22q11.1	End	15,529,139 bp
RNA expression pattern
Bgee	Human / Mouse (ortholog); Top expressed in: muscle of thigh; circulatory system; aorta; thoracic aorta; ascending aorta / n/a; More reference expression data
BioGPS	n/a
Gene ontology
Molecular function	olfactory receptor activity; signal transducer activity; G protein-coupled receptor activity
Cellular component	integral component of membrane; plasma membrane; membrane
Biological process	sensory perception of smell; detection of chemical stimulus involved in sensory perception of smell; signal transduction; response to stimulus; G protein-coupled receptor signaling pathway
Sources:Amigo / QuickGO
Orthologs
Databases	NCBI: entry; OMA: entry
Species	Human	Mouse
Entrez	81061	n/a
Ensembl	ENSG00000130538	n/a
UniProt	Q8NG94	n/a
RefSeq (mRNA)	NM_001005239	n/a
RefSeq (protein)	NP_001005239	n/a
Location (UCSC)	Chr 22: 15.53 – 15.53 Mb	n/a
PubMed search		n/a
- Wikidata
View/Edit Human

Olfactory receptor 11H1 is a protein that in humans is encoded by the OR11H1 gene.

Olfactory receptors interact with odorant molecules in the nose, to initiate a neuronal response that triggers the perception of a smell. The olfactory receptor proteins are members of a large family of G-protein-coupled receptors (GPCR) arising from single coding-exon genes. Olfactory receptors share a 7-transmembrane domain structure with many neurotransmitter and hormone receptors and are responsible for the recognition and G protein-mediated transduction of odorant signals. The olfactory receptor gene family is the largest in the genome. The nomenclature assigned to the olfactory receptor genes and proteins for this organism is independent of other organisms.

== See also ==
- Olfactory receptor
