= OR6V1 =

Protein-coding gene in the species Homo sapiens

Identifiers
- Aliases: OR6V1, GPR138, olfactory receptor family 6 subfamily V member 1
- External IDs: GeneCards: OR6V1

Gene location (Human)
Chr.	Chromosome 7 (human)
Band	7q34	Start	143,052,341 bp
Band	7q34	End	143,053,282 bp
RNA expression pattern
Bgee	Human / Mouse (ortholog); Top expressed in: testicle; corpus callosum; sural nerve / n/a; More reference expression data
BioGPS	n/a
Gene ontology
Molecular function	G protein-coupled receptor activity; olfactory receptor activity; signal transducer activity
Cellular component	integral component of membrane; plasma membrane; membrane
Biological process	sensory perception of smell; detection of chemical stimulus involved in sensory perception of smell; signal transduction; response to stimulus; G protein-coupled receptor signaling pathway
Sources:Amigo / QuickGO
Orthologs
Databases	NCBI: entry; OMA: entry
Species	Human	Mouse
Entrez	346517	n/a
Ensembl	ENSG00000277378; ENSG00000225781	n/a
UniProt	Q8N148	n/a
RefSeq (mRNA)	NM_001001667	n/a
RefSeq (protein)	NP_001001667	n/a
Location (UCSC)	Chr 7: 143.05 – 143.05 Mb	n/a
PubMed search		n/a
- Wikidata
View/Edit Human

Olfactory receptor 6V1 is a protein that in humans is encoded by the OR6V1 gene.

Olfactory receptors interact with odorant molecules in the nose, to initiate a neuronal response that triggers the perception of a smell. The olfactory receptor proteins are members of a large family of G-protein-coupled receptors (GPCR) arising from single coding-exon genes. Olfactory receptors share a 7-transmembrane domain structure with many neurotransmitter and hormone receptors and are responsible for the recognition and G protein-mediated transduction of odorant signals. The olfactory receptor gene family is the largest in the genome. The nomenclature assigned to the olfactory receptor genes and proteins for this organism is independent of other organisms.

== See also ==
- Olfactory receptor
