= PDZ domain containing 9 =

Protein-coding gene in the species Homo sapiens

PDZD9

Identifiers
- Aliases: PDZD9, C16orf65, PDZ domain containing 9
- External IDs: MGI: 1915233; GeneCards: PDZD9
Available structures
PDB	Ortholog search: PDBe RCSB
PDB	List of PDB id codes 1WIF

Gene location (Human)
Chr.	Chromosome 16 (human)
Band	16p12.2	Start	21,983,865 bp
Band	16p12.2	End	22,001,116 bp

Gene location (Mouse)
Chr.	Chromosome 7 (mouse)
Band	7|7 F2	Start	120,257,954 bp
Band	7|7 F2	End	120,269,566 bp
RNA expression pattern
Bgee	Human / Mouse (ortholog); Top expressed in: left testis; right testis; cerebellar cortex; cerebellar hemisphere; right hemisphere of cerebellum; prefrontal cortex; Brodmann area 9; nucleus accumbens; primary visual cortex; putamen / Top expressed in: spermatid; spermatocyte; seminiferous tubule; tail of embryo; embryo; muscle of thigh; dentate gyrus of hippocampal formation granule cell; genital tubercle; blastocyst; ventricular zone; More reference expression data
BioGPS	n/a
Orthologs
Databases	NCBI: entry; OMA: entry
Species	Human	Mouse
Entrez	255762	67983
Ensembl	ENSG00000284316; ENSG00000155714	ENSMUSG00000030887
UniProt	Q8IXQ8	Q9D9M4
RefSeq (mRNA)	NM_173806; NM_001363519; NM_001370530	NM_001040136; NM_001040137
RefSeq (protein)	NP_776167; NP_001350448; NP_001357459	NP_001035226; NP_001035227
Location (UCSC)	Chr 16: 21.98 – 22 Mb	Chr 7: 120.26 – 120.27 Mb
PubMed search
- Wikidata
View/Edit Human	View/Edit Mouse

PDZ domain containing 9 is a protein that in humans is encoded by the PDZD9 gene.
