= OR5F1 =

Protein-coding gene in the species Homo sapiens

Identifiers
- Aliases: OR5F1, OR11-10, olfactory receptor family 5 subfamily F member 1
- External IDs: OMIM: 608492; GeneCards: OR5F1

Gene location (Human)
Chr.	Chromosome 11 (human)
Band	11q12.1	Start	55,993,681 bp
Band	11q12.1	End	55,994,625 bp
Gene ontology
Molecular function	G protein-coupled receptor activity; odorant binding; signal transducer activity; olfactory receptor activity
Cellular component	membrane; plasma membrane; integral component of membrane
Biological process	signal transduction; response to stimulus; sensory perception of smell; detection of chemical stimulus involved in sensory perception of smell; G protein-coupled receptor signaling pathway
Sources:Amigo / QuickGO
Orthologs
Databases	NCBI: entry; OMA: entry
Species	Human	Mouse
Entrez	338674	n/a
Ensembl	ENSG00000149133	n/a
UniProt	O95221	n/a
RefSeq (mRNA)	NM_003697	n/a
RefSeq (protein)	NP_003688	n/a
Location (UCSC)	Chr 11: 55.99 – 55.99 Mb	n/a
PubMed search		n/a
- Wikidata
View/Edit Human

Olfactory receptor 5F1 is a protein that in humans is encoded by the OR5F1 gene.

Olfactory receptors interact with odorant molecules in the nose, to initiate a neuronal response that triggers the perception of a smell. The olfactory receptor proteins are members of a large family of G-protein-coupled receptors (GPCR) arising from single coding-exon genes. Olfactory receptors share a 7-transmembrane domain structure with many neurotransmitter and hormone receptors and are responsible for the recognition and G protein-mediated transduction of odorant signals. The olfactory receptor gene family is the largest in the genome. The nomenclature assigned to the olfactory receptor genes and proteins for this organism is independent of other organisms.

== See also ==
- Olfactory receptor
