= OR52E5 =

Olfactory Protein in humans

Identifiers
- Aliases: OR52E5, OR11-56, olfactory receptor family 52 subfamily E member 5
- External IDs: GeneCards: OR52E5

Gene location (Human)
Chr.	Chromosome 11 (human)
Band	11p15.4	Start	5,893,208 bp
Band	11p15.4	End	5,902,730 bp
RNA expression pattern
Bgee	Human / Mouse (ortholog); Top expressed in: testicle / n/a; More reference expression data
BioGPS	n/a
Orthologs
Databases	NCBI: entry; OMA: entry
Species	Human	Mouse
Entrez	390082	n/a
Ensembl	ENSG00000277932	n/a
UniProt	n a	n/a
RefSeq (mRNA)	NM_001005166	n/a
RefSeq (protein)	n/a	n/a
Location (UCSC)	Chr 11: 5.89 – 5.9 Mb	n/a
PubMed search		n/a
- Wikidata
View/Edit Human

Olfactory receptor 52E5 is a protein that in humans is encoded by the OR52E5 gene.

Olfactory receptors interact with odorant molecules in the nose, to initiate a neuronal response that triggers the perception of a smell. The olfactory receptor proteins are members of a large family of G-protein-coupled receptors (GPCR) arising from single coding-exon genes. Olfactory receptors share a 7-transmembrane domain structure with many neurotransmitter and hormone receptors and are responsible for the recognition and G protein-mediated transduction of odorant signals. The olfactory receptor gene family is the largest in the genome. The nomenclature assigned to the olfactory receptor genes and proteins for this organism is independent of other organisms.

== See also ==
- Olfactory receptor
