= PDZ domain =

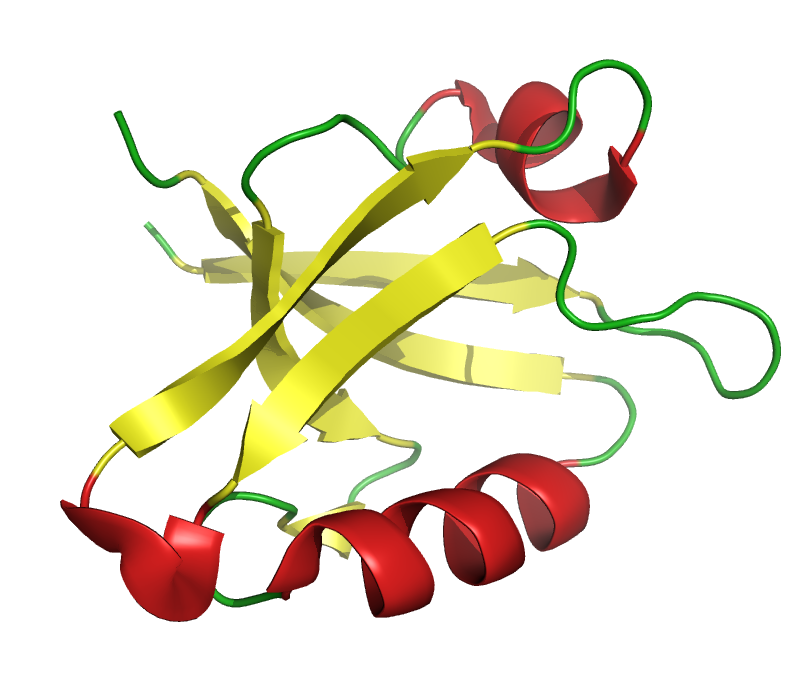
- Molecular structure of the PDZ domain included in the human GOPC (Golgi-associated PDZ and coiled-coil motif-containing protein) protein

Identifiers
- Symbol: PDZ
- Pfam: PF00595
- InterPro: IPR001478
- SMART: PDZ
- PROSITE: PDOC50106
- SCOP2: 1lcy / SCOPe / SUPFAM
- CDD: cd00136
Available protein structures:
- PDB: 1l1jB:248-262 1lcyA:388-442 1fc7A:151-232 1fc9A:151-232 1fcfA:151-232 1fc6A:151-232 1ueqA:426-492 1ujvA:639-680 1i92A:14-91 1g9oA:14-91 1q3oA:663-754 1q3pA:663-754 1uepA:778-859 1wfvA:1147-1226 1uewA:920-1007 2cs5A:517-602 1qavA:81-161 2pdzA:81-161 1z86A:81-161 1z87A:81-161 1pdr :466-544 1tq3A:313-391 1be9A:313-391 1bfeA:313-391 1tp5A:313-391 1tp3A:313-391 1um7A:386-464 1iu2A:65-149 1iu0A:65-149 1kefA:65-149 1zokA:224-308 1qlcA:160-244 2bygA:193-277 2fe5A:226-310 1wi2A:47-125 1whaA:871-947 1x5qA: 728-812 1t2mA:993-1073 1um1A:974-1056 1wf8A:504-589 1gm1A:1357-1439 1oziA:1357-1439 1vj6A:1357-1439 1d5gA:1368-1450 3pdzA:1368-1450 1q7xA:1368-1450 1ujuA:1100-1189 1wi4A:22-94 1l6oA:254-339 1mc7A:251-336 1n7tA:1323-1407 1mfgA:1323-1407 1mflA:1323-1407 1uezA:140-219 1uf1A:279-357 1x5nA:211-289 1ihjA:17-103 1uhpA:249-336 1uitA:1240-1316 1x6dA:412-495 2csjA:10-94 1m5zA:988-1067 2cssA:605-688 1zubA:619-702 1wfgA:668-753 1ufxA:816-887 1qauA:17-96 1b8qA:17-96 1u38A:656-740 1u37A:656-740 1u3bA:656-740 1x45A:656-740 1p1dA:471-557 1p1eA:471-557 1x5rA:456-542 1v62A:248-329 1n7fA:672-751 1n7eA:672-751 1wf7A:5-82 1rgwA:4-81 1vb7A:3-81 1i16 :533-616 1v6bA:752-838 2f5yB:300-373 1whdA:18-92 1yboA:114-191 1v1tB:114-191 1obzB:114-191 1n99A:114-191 1wh1A:419-501 1va8A:256-333 1kwaA:490-568 1nf3D:157-247 1rzxA:160-250 1obyB:198-270 1obxA:198-270 1nteA:198-270 1r6jA:198-270 1u39A:747-820 1y7nA:747-820 IPR001478 PF00595 (ECOD; PDBsum)
- AlphaFold: IPR001478; PF00595

The PDZ domain is a common structural domain of 80-90 amino-acids found in the signaling proteins of bacteria, yeast, plants, viruses and animals. Proteins containing PDZ domains play a key role in anchoring receptor proteins in the membrane to cytoskeletal components. Proteins with these domains help hold together and organize signaling complexes at cellular membranes. These domains play a key role in the formation and function of signal transduction complexes. PDZ domains also play a highly significant role in the anchoring of cell surface receptors (such as Cftr and FZD7) to the actin cytoskeleton via mediators like NHERF and ezrin.

PDZ is an initialism combining the first letters of the first three proteins discovered to share the domain — post synaptic density protein (PSD95), Drosophila disc large tumor suppressor (Dlg1), and zonula occludens-1 protein (zo-1). PDZ domains have previously been referred to as DHR (Dlg homologous region) or GLGF (glycine-leucine-glycine-phenylalanine) domains.

In general PDZ domains bind to a short region of the C-terminus of other specific proteins. These short regions bind to the PDZ domain by beta sheet augmentation. This means that the beta sheet in the PDZ domain is extended by the addition of a further beta strand from the tail of the binding partner protein. The C-terminal carboxylate group is bound by a nest (protein structural motif) in the PDZ domain, i.e. a PDZ-binding motif.

== Origins of discovery ==
PDZ is an acronym derived from the names of the first proteins in which the domain was observed. Post-synaptic density protein 95 (PSD-95) is a synaptic protein found only in the brain. Drosophila disc large tumor suppressor (Dlg1) and zona occludens 1 (ZO-1) both play an important role at cell junctions and in cell signaling complexes. Since the discovery of PDZ domains more than 20 years ago, hundreds of additional PDZ domains have been identified. The first published use of the phrase “PDZ domain” was not in a paper, but a letter. In September 1995, Dr. Mary B. Kennedy of the California Institute of Technology wrote a letter of correction to Trends in Biomedical Sciences. Earlier that year, another set of scientists had claimed to discover a new protein domain which they called a DHR domain. Dr. Kennedy refuted that her lab had previously described exactly the same domain as a series of “GLGF repeats”. She continued to explain that in order to “better reflect the origin and distribution of the domain,” the new title of the domain would be changed. Thus, the name “PDZ domain” was introduced to the world.

== Structure ==
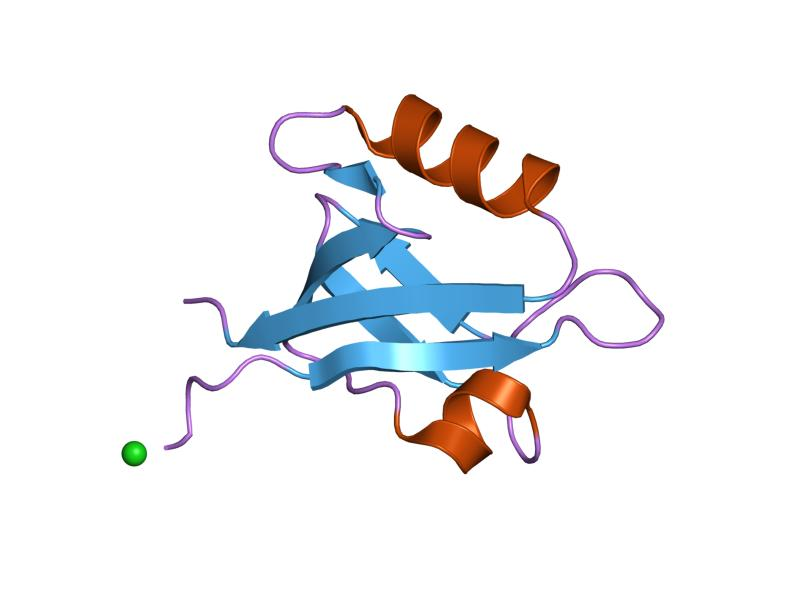
6 β-strands (blue) and two α-helix (red) are the common motif for PDZ domains.

PDZ domain structure is partially conserved across the various proteins that contain them. They usually have 5-6 β-strands and one short and one long α-helix. Apart from this conserved fold, the secondary structure differs across PDZ domains. This domain tends to be globular with a diameter of about 35 Å.

When studied, PDZ domains are usually isolated as monomers, however some PDZ proteins form dimers. The function of PDZ dimers as compared to monomers is not yet known.

A commonly accepted theory for the binding pocket of the PDZ domain is that it is constituted by several hydrophobic amino acids, apart from the GLGF sequence mentioned earlier, the mainchain atoms of which form a nest (protein structural motif) binding the C-terminal carboxylate of the protein or peptide ligand. Most PDZ domains have such a binding site located between one of the β-strands and the long α-helix.

== Functions ==
PDZ domains have two main functions: Localizing cellular elements, and regulating cellular pathways.

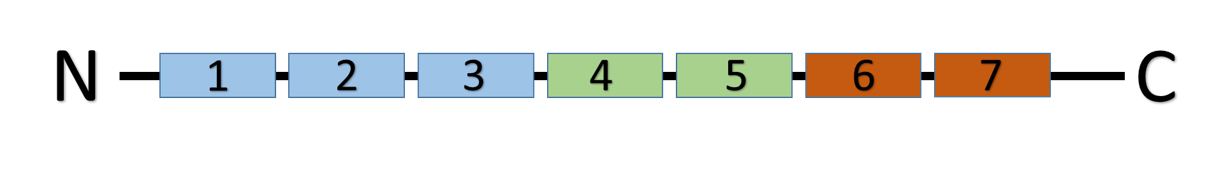
An example of a protein (GRIP) with seven PDZ domains.

The first discovered function of the PDZ domains was to anchor receptor proteins in the membrane to cytoskeletal components. PDZ domains also have regulatory functions on different signaling pathways. Any protein may have one or several PDZ domains, which can be identical or unique (see figure to right). This variety allows these proteins to be very versatile in their interactions. Different PDZ domains in the same protein can have different roles, each binding a different part of the target protein or a different protein altogether.

=== Localization ===
PDZ domains play a vital role in organizing and maintaining complex scaffolding formations.

PDZ domains are found in diverse proteins, but all assist in localization of cellular elements. PDZ domains are primarily involved in anchoring receptor proteins to the cytoskeleton. For cells to function properly it is important for components—proteins and other molecules— to be in the right place at the right time. Proteins with PDZ domains bind different components to ensure correct arrangements. In the neuron, making sense of neurotransmitter activity requires specific receptors to be located in the lipid membrane at the synapse. PDZ domains are crucial to this receptor localization process. Proteins with PDZ domains generally associate with both the C-terminus of the receptor and cytoskeletal elements in order to anchor the receptor to the cytoskeleton and keep it in place. Without such an interaction, receptors would diffuse out of the synapse due to the fluid nature of the lipid membrane.

PDZ domains are also utilized to localize elements other than receptor proteins. In the human brain, nitric oxide often acts in the synapse to modify cGMP levels in response to NMDA receptor activation. In order to ensure a favorable spatial arrangements, neuronal nitric oxide synthase (nNOS) is brought close to NMDA receptors via interactions with PDZ domains on PSD-95, which concurrently binds nNOS and NMDA receptors. With nNOS located closely to NMDA receptors, it will be activated immediately after calcium ions begin entering the cell.

=== Regulation ===
PDZ domains are directly involved in the regulation of different cellular pathways. This mechanism of this regulation varies as PDZ domains are able to interact with a range of cellular components. This regulation is usually a result of the co-localization of multiple signaling molecules such as in the example with nNos and NMDA receptors. Some examples of signaling pathway regulation executed by the PDZ domain include phosphatase enzyme activity, mechanosensory signaling, and the sorting pathway of endocytosed receptor proteins.

The signaling pathway of the human protein tyrosine phosphatase non-receptor type 4 (PTPN4) is regulated by PDZ domains. This protein is involved in regulating cell death. Normally the PDZ domain of this enzyme is unbound. In this unbound state the enzyme is active and prevents cell signaling for apoptosis. Binding the PDZ domain of this phosphatase results in a loss of enzyme activity, which leads to apoptosis. The normal regulation of this enzyme prevents cells from prematurely going through apoptosis. When the regulation of the PTPN4 enzyme is lost, there is increased oncogenic activity as the cells are able to proliferate.

PDZ domains also have a regulatory role in mechanosensory signaling in proprioceptors and vestibular and auditory hair cells. The protein Whirlin (WHRN) localizes in the post-synaptic neurons of hair cells that transform mechanical movement into action potentials that the body can interpret. WHRN proteins contains three PDZ domains. The domains located near the N-terminus bind to receptor proteins and other signaling components. When the one of these PDZ domains is inhibited, the signaling pathways of the neurons are disrupted, resulting in auditory, visual, and vestibular impairment. This regulation is thought to be based on the physical positioning WHRN and the selectivity of its PDZ domain.

Regulation of receptor proteins occurs when the PDZ domain on the EBP50 protein binds to the C-terminus of the beta-2 adrenergic receptor (β2-AR). EBP50 also associates with a complex that connects to actin, thus serving as a link between the cytoskeleton and β2-AR. The β2-AR receptor is eventually endocytosed, where it will either be consigned to a lysosome for degradation or recycled back to the cell membrane. Scientists have demonstrated that when the Ser-411 residue of the β2-AR PDZ binding domain, which interacts directly with EBP50, is phosphorylated, the receptor is degraded. If Ser-411 is left unmodified, the receptor is recycled. The role played by PDZ domains and their binding sites indicate a regulative relevance beyond simply receptor protein localization.

PDZ domains are being studied further to better understand the role they play in different signaling pathways. Research has increased as these domains have been linked to different diseases including cancer as discussed above.

== Regulation of PDZ domain activity ==
PDZ domain function can be both inhibited and activated by various mechanisms. Two of the most prevalent include allosteric interactions and posttranslational modifications.

=== Post-translational modifications ===
The most common post-traslational modification seen on PDZ domains is phosphorylation. This modification is primarily an inhibitor of PDZ domain and ligand activity. In some examples, phosphorylation of amino acid side chains eliminates the ability of the PDZ domain to form hydrogen bonds, disrupting the normal binding patterns. The end result is a loss of PDZ domain function and further signaling. Another way phosphorylation can disrupt regular PDZ domain function is by altering the charge ratio and further affecting binding and signaling. In rare cases researchers have seen post-translational modifications activate PDZ domain activity but these cases are few.

Disulfide bridges inhibit PDZ domain function

Another post-translational modification that can regulate PDZ domains is the formation of disulfide bridges. Many PDZ domains contain cysteines and are susceptible to disulfide bond formation in oxidizing conditions. This modification acts primarily as an inhibitor of PDZ domain function.

=== Allosteric Interactions ===
Protein-protein interactions have been observed to alter the effectiveness of PDZ domains binding to ligands. These studies show that allosteric effects of certain proteins can affect the binding affinity for different substrates. Different PDZ domains can even have this allosteric effect on each other. This PDZ-PDZ interaction only acts as an inhibitor. Other experiments have shown that certain enzymes can enhance the binding of PDZ domains. Researchers found that the protein ezrin enhances the binding of the PDZ protein NHERF1.

== PDZ proteins ==
PDZ proteins are a family of proteins that contain the PDZ domain. This sequence of amino-acids is found in many thousands of known proteins. PDZ domain proteins are widespread in eukaryotes and eubacteria, whereas there are very few examples of the protein in archaea. PDZ domains are often associated with other protein domains and these combinations allow them to carry out their specific functions. Three of the most well documented PDZ proteins are PSD-95, GRIP, and HOMER.

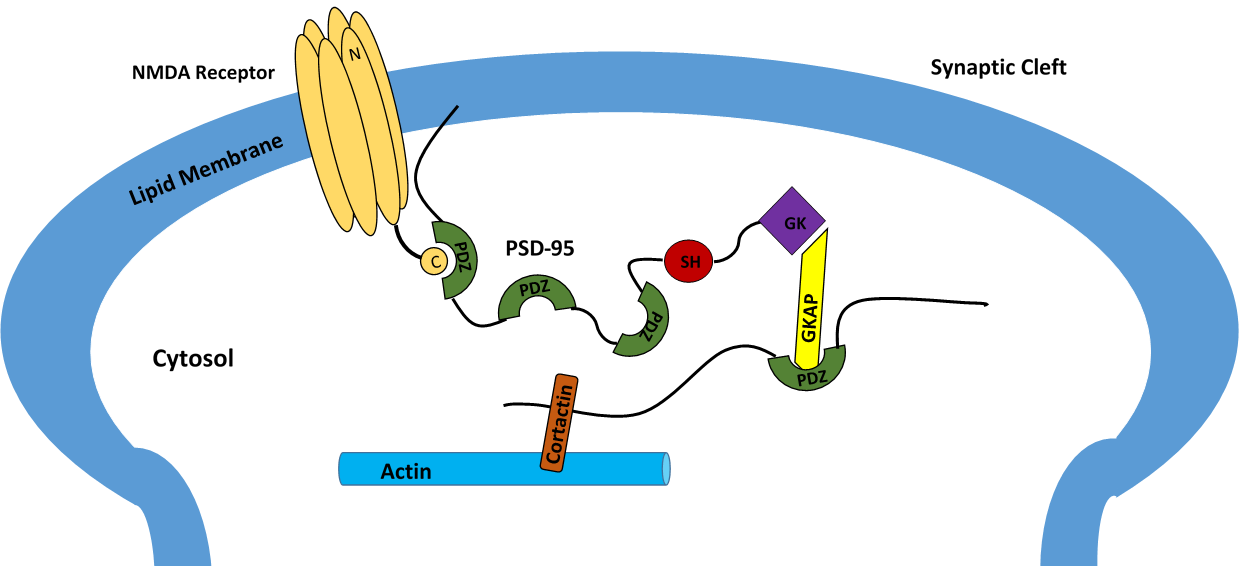
Basic functioning of PSD-95 in forming a complex between NMDA Receptor and Actin.

PSD-95 is a brain synaptic protein with three PDZ domains, each with unique properties and structures that allow PSD-95 to function in many ways. In general, the first two PDZ domains interact with receptors and the third interacts with cytoskeleton-related proteins. The main receptors associated with PSD-95 are NMDA receptors. The first two PDZ domains of PSD-95 bind to the C-terminus of NMDA receptors and anchor them in the membrane at the point of neurotransmitter release. The first two PDZ domains can also interact in a similar fashion with Shaker-type K+ channels. A PDZ interaction between PSD-95, nNOS and syntrophin is mediated by the second PDZ domain. The third and final PDZ domain links to cysteine-rich PDZ-binding protein (CRIPT), which allows PSD-95 to associate with the cytoskeleton.

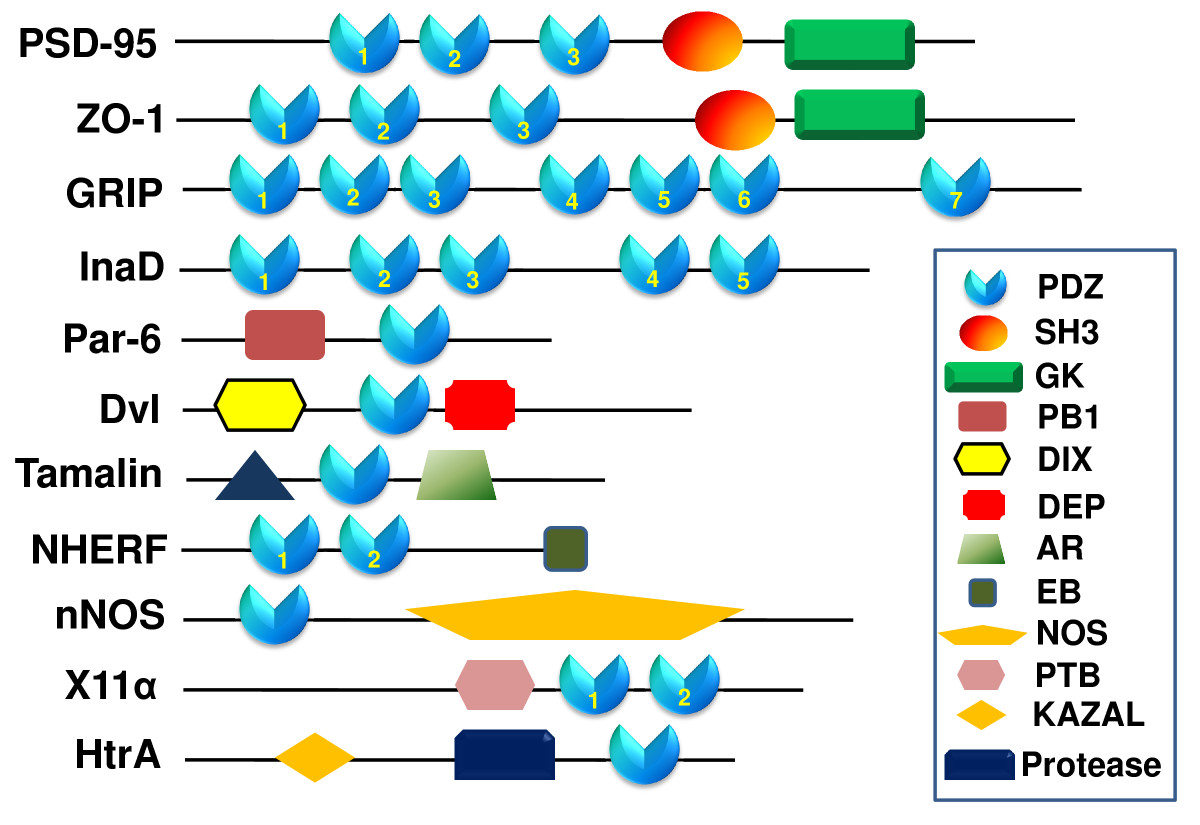
Examples of PDZ domain-containing proteins (Figure from Lee et al. 2010). Proteins are indicated by black lines scaled to the length of the primary sequence of the protein. Different shapes refer to different protein domains.

Glutamate receptor interacting protein (GRIP) is a post-synaptic protein that interacts with AMPA receptors in a fashion analogous to PSD-95 interactions with NMDA receptors. When researchers noticed apparent structural homology between the C-termini of AMPA receptors and NMDA receptors, they attempted to determine if a similar PDZ interaction was occurring. A yeast two-hybrid system helped them discover that out of GRIP's seven PDZ domains, two (domains four and five) were essential for binding of GRIP to the AMPA subunit called GluR2. This interaction is vital for proper localization of AMPA receptors, which play a large part in memory storage. Other researchers discovered that domains six and seven of GRIP are responsible for connecting GRIP to a family of receptor tyrosine kinases called ephrin receptors, which are important signaling proteins. A clinical study concluded that Fraser syndrome, an autosomal recessive syndrome that can cause severe deformations, can be caused by a simple mutation in GRIP.

HOMER differs significantly from many known PDZ proteins, including GRIP and PSD-95. Instead of mediating receptors near ion channels, as is the case with GRIP and PSD-95, HOMER is involved in metabotropic glutamate signaling. Another unique aspect of HOMER is that it only contains a single PDZ domain, which mediates interactions between HOMER and type 5 metabotropic glutamate receptor (mGluR5). The single GLGF repeat on HOMER binds amino acids on the C-terminus of mGluR5. HOMER expression is measured at high levels during embryologic stages in rats, suggesting an important developmental function.

=== Human PDZ proteins ===
There are roughly 260 PDZ domains in humans. Several proteins contain multiple PDZ domains, so the number of unique PDZ-containing proteins is closer to 180. In the table below are some of the better studied members of this family:

Studied PDZ Proteins
| Erbin | GRIP | Htra1 | Htra2 |
| Htra3 | PSD-95 | SAP97 | CARD10 |
| CARD11 | CARD14 | PTP-BL | |

The table below contains all known PDZ proteins in humans (alphabetical):

PDZ Proteins in Humans
| AAG12 | AHNAK | AHNAK2 | AIP1 | ALP | APBA1 | APBA2 | APBA3 | ARHGAP21 | ARHGAP23 | ARHGEF11 | ARHGEF12 | CARD10 | CARD11 | CARD14 |
| CASK | CLP-36 | CNKSR2 | CNKSR3 | CRTAM | DFNB31 | DLG1 | DLG2 | DLG3 | DLG4 | DLG5 | DVL1 | DVL1L1 | DVL2 | DVL3 |
| ERBB2IP | FRMPD1 | FRMPD2 | FRMPD2L1 | FRMPD3 | FRMPD4 | GIPC1 | GIPC2 | GIPC3 | GOPC | GRASP | GRIP1 | GRIP2 | HTRA1 | HTRA2 |
| HTRA3 | HTRA4 | IL16 | INADL | KIAA1849 | LDB3 | LIMK1 | LIMK2 | LIN7A | LIN7B | LIN7C | LMO7 | LNX1 | LNX2 | LRRC7 |
| MAGI1 | MAGI2 | MAGI3 | MAGIX | MAST1 | MAST2 | MAST3 | MAST4 | MCSP | MLLT4 | MPDZ | MPP1 | MPP2 | MPP3 | MPP4 |
| MPP5 | MPP6 | MPP7 | MYO18A | NHERF1 | NOS1 | PARD3 | PARD6A | PARD6B | PARD6G | PDLIM1 | PDLIM2 | PDLIM3 | PDLIM4 | PDLIM5 |
| PDLIM7 | PDZD11 | PDZD2 | PDZD3 | PDZD4 | PDZD5A | PDZD7 | PDZD8 | PDZK1 | PDZRN3 | PDZRN4 | PICK1 | PPP1R9A | PPP1R9B | PREX1 |
| PRX | PSCDBP | PTPN13 | PTPN3 | PTPN4 | RAPGEF2 | RGS12 | RGS3 | RHPN1 | RIL | RIMS1 | RIMS2 | SCN5A | SCRIB | SDCBP |
| SDCBP2 | SHANK1 | SHANK2 | SHANK3 | SHROOM2 | SHROOM3 | SHROOM4 | SIPA1 | SIPA1L1 | SIPA1L2 | SIPA1L3 | SLC9A3R1 | SLC9A3R2 | SNTA1 | SNTB1 |
| SNTB2 | SNTG1 | SNTG2 | SNX27 | SPAL2 | STXBP4 | SYNJ2BP | SYNPO2 | SYNPO2L | TAX1BP3 | TIAM1 | TIAM2 | TJP1 | TJP2 | TJP3 |
| TRPC4 | TRPC5 | USH1C | WHRN | | | | | | | | | | | |

There is currently one known virus containing PDZ domains:

Viruses
Tax1
