= TAX1BP3 =

Protein-coding gene in the species Homo sapiens

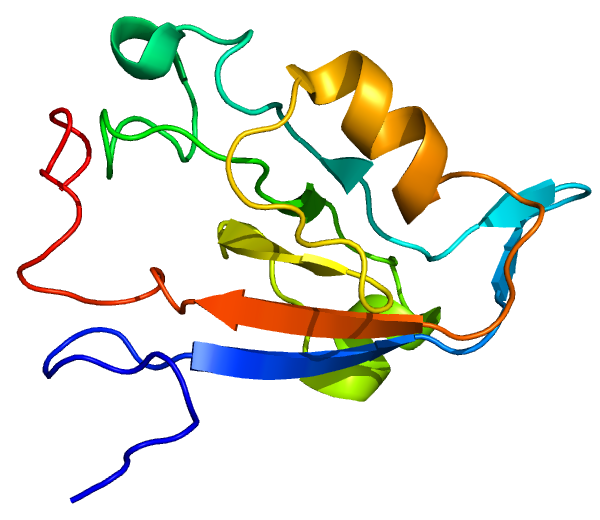

Identifiers
- Aliases: TAX1BP3, TIP-1, TIP1, Tax1 binding protein 3
- External IDs: OMIM: 616484; MGI: 1923531; GeneCards: TAX1BP3
Available structures
PDB	Ortholog search: PDBe RCSB
PDB	List of PDB id codes 2KG2, 2L4S, 2L4T, 2VZ5, 3GJ9, 3SFJ, 4E3B, 4NNL, 4NNM

Gene location (Human)
Chr.	Chromosome 17 (human)
Band	17p13.2	Start	3,662,895 bp
Band	17p13.2	End	3,668,679 bp

Gene location (Mouse)
Chr.	Chromosome 11 (mouse)
Band	11|11 B4	Start	73,067,909 bp
Band	11|11 B4	End	73,073,988 bp
RNA expression pattern
Bgee	Human / Mouse (ortholog); Top expressed in: tibial nerve; apex of heart; mucosa of esophagus; canal of the cervix; mucosa of transverse colon; ectocervix; vagina; right auricle of heart; left ventricle; left coronary artery / Top expressed in: ileum; jejunum; stomach; blastocyst; colon; urinary bladder; yolk sac; neural tube; white adipose tissue; lung; More reference expression data
BioGPS	n/a
Gene ontology
Molecular function	beta-catenin binding; protein C-terminus binding; protein binding
Cellular component	cytoplasm; cytosol; plasma membrane; extracellular exosome; membrane; nucleus; fibrillar center; actin cytoskeleton; intracellular membrane-bounded organelle
Biological process	negative regulation of Wnt signaling pathway; negative regulation of protein localization to cell surface; regulation of Wnt signaling pathway; Wnt signaling pathway; Rho protein signal transduction; activation of GTPase activity; negative regulation of cell population proliferation
Sources:Amigo / QuickGO
Orthologs
Databases	NCBI: entry; OMA: entry
Species	Human	Mouse
Entrez	30851	76281
Ensembl	ENSG00000213977	ENSMUSG00000040158
UniProt	O14907	Q9DBG9
RefSeq (mRNA)	NM_014604; NM_001204698	NM_029564
RefSeq (protein)	NP_001191627; NP_055419	NP_083840
Location (UCSC)	Chr 17: 3.66 – 3.67 Mb	Chr 11: 73.07 – 73.07 Mb
PubMed search
- Wikidata
View/Edit Human	View/Edit Mouse

Tax1-binding protein 3 is a protein that in humans is encoded by the TAX1BP3 gene. This name is in reference to the Tax1 protein of the Human T-cell Lymphotropic Virus (HTLV) which was used to discover Tax1BP3 in a yeast 2-hybrid screen and subsequently verified by co-IP. TIP1, as it is also known, is a PDZ domain containing protein. However, unlike most PDZ domain proteins which act as scaffolds and often contain multiple PDZ domains as well as other protein domains, TIP1 is essentially just the PDZ domain. This has led to the speculation that TIP1 acts as an inhibitor, either acting to separate PDZ binding motifs from their normal targets or simply preventing the protein to migrate away from the cytosol.
