= PTPN13 =

Protein-coding gene in the species Homo sapiens

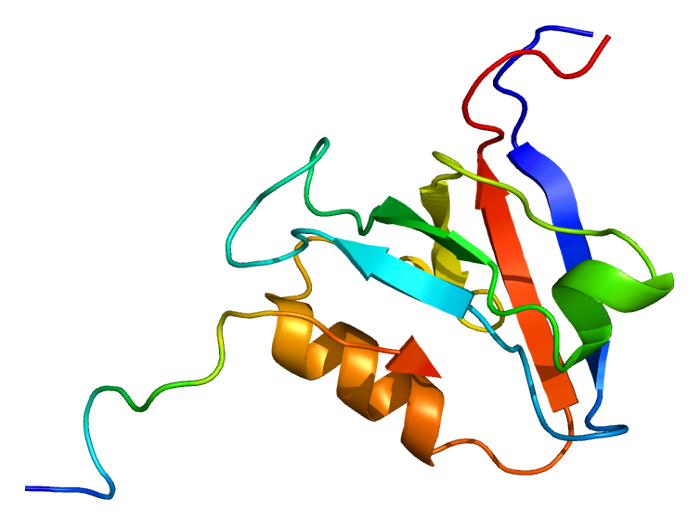

Identifiers
- Aliases: PTPN13, FAP-1, PNP1, PTP-BAS, PTP-BL, PTP1E, PTPL1, PTPLE, hPTP1E, protein tyrosine phosphatase, non-receptor type 13, protein tyrosine phosphatase non-receptor type 13
- External IDs: OMIM: 600267; MGI: 103293; GeneCards: PTPN13
Available structures
PDB	Ortholog search: PDBe RCSB
PDB	List of PDB id codes 1D5G, 1Q7X, 1WCH, 2M0Z, 2M10, 3LNX, 3LNY, 3PDZ
Enzyme activity
EC #	BRENDA	ExPASy	KEGG	MetaCyc
3.1.3.48	↗	↗	↗	↗

Gene location (Human)
Chr.	Chromosome 4 (human)
Band	4q21.3	Start	86,594,315 bp
Band	4q21.3	End	86,815,171 bp

Gene location (Mouse)
Chr.	Chromosome 5 (mouse)
Band	5 E5|5 50.43 cM	Start	103,573,058 bp
Band	5 E5|5 50.43 cM	End	103,746,169 bp
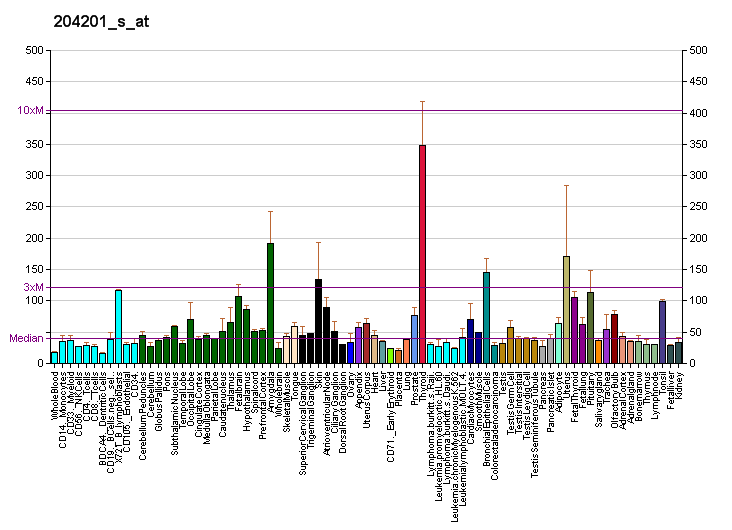
RNA expression pattern
Bgee	Human / Mouse (ortholog); Top expressed in: mucosa of paranasal sinus; urethra; human penis; palpebral conjunctiva; retinal pigment epithelium; skin of arm; renal medulla; trigeminal ganglion; gingival epithelium; mucosa of pharynx / Top expressed in: corneal stroma; hair follicle; mucosa of urinary bladder; transitional epithelium of urinary bladder; retinal pigment epithelium; medullary collecting duct; skin of external ear; conjunctival fornix; skin of back; sciatic nerve; More reference expression data
BioGPS	More reference expression data
Gene ontology
Molecular function	protein tyrosine phosphatase activity; phosphatase activity; phosphatidylinositol 3-kinase regulatory subunit binding; protein binding; phosphoprotein phosphatase activity; hydrolase activity
Cellular component	cytoplasm; cell body; neuron projection; cell projection; extracellular exosome; cytoskeleton; nucleus; lamellipodium; plasma membrane; nucleoplasm
Biological process	protein dephosphorylation; peptidyl-tyrosine dephosphorylation; regulation of phosphatidylinositol 3-kinase signaling; dephosphorylation; phosphatidylinositol biosynthetic process; negative regulation of protein phosphorylation; cellular response to cytokine stimulus; bicellular tight junction assembly
Sources:Amigo / QuickGO
Orthologs
Databases	NCBI: entry; OMA: entry
Species	Human	Mouse
Entrez	5783	19249
Ensembl	ENSG00000163629	ENSMUSG00000034573
UniProt	Q12923	Q64512
RefSeq (mRNA)	NM_006264; NM_080683; NM_080684; NM_080685	NM_011204
RefSeq (protein)	NP_006255; NP_542414; NP_542415; NP_542416	NP_035334
Location (UCSC)	Chr 4: 86.59 – 86.82 Mb	Chr 5: 103.57 – 103.75 Mb
PubMed search
- Wikidata
View/Edit Human	View/Edit Mouse

Tyrosine-protein phosphatase non-receptor type 13 is an enzyme that in humans is encoded by the PTPN13 gene.

The protein encoded by this gene is a member of the protein tyrosine phosphatase (PTP) family. PTPs are known to be signaling molecules that regulate a variety of cellular processes including cell growth, differentiation, mitotic cycle, and oncogenic transformation. This PTP is a large protein that possesses a PTP domain at C-terminus, and multiple noncatalytic domains, which include a domain with similarity to band 4.1 superfamily of cytoskeletal-associated proteins, a region consisting of five PDZ domains, and a leucine zipper motif. This PTP was found to interact with, and dephosphorylate Fas receptor, as well as IkappaBalpha through the PDZ domains, which suggested its role in Fas mediated programmed cell death. This PTP was also shown to interact with GTPase-activating protein, and thus may function as a regulator of Rho signaling pathway. Four alternatively spliced transcript variants, which encode distinct proteins, have been reported.

== Interactions ==
PTPN13 has been shown to interact with PKN2.
