= PALS2 =

Protein-coding gene in the species Homo sapiens

Identifiers
- Aliases: PALS2, VAM1, membrane palmitoylated protein 6, protein associated with LIN7 2, MAGUK family member, protein associated with LIN7 2, MAGUK p55 family member, MPP6, VAM-1, p55T
- External IDs: OMIM: 606959; MGI: 1927340; GeneCards: PALS2

Gene location (Human)
Chr.	Chromosome 7 (human)
Band	7p15.3	Start	24,573,268 bp
Band	7p15.3	End	24,694,193 bp

Gene location (Mouse)
Chr.	Chromosome 6 (mouse)
Band	6 B2.3|6 24.13 cM	Start	50,087,221 bp
Band	6 B2.3|6 24.13 cM	End	50,175,919 bp
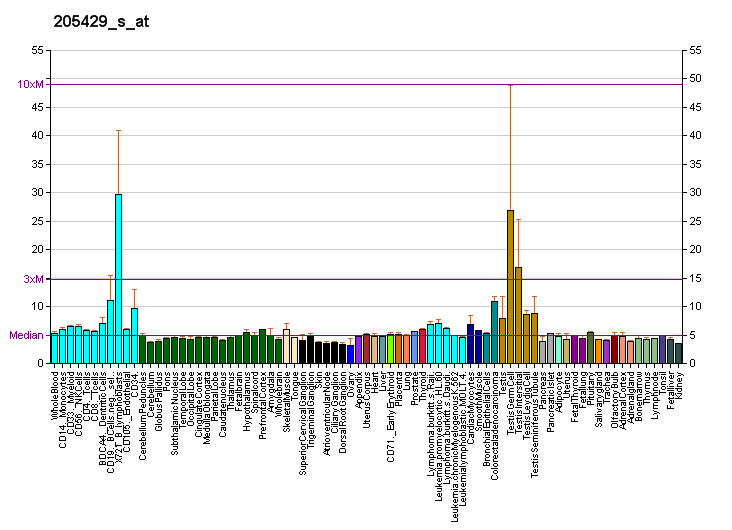
RNA expression pattern
Bgee	Human / Mouse (ortholog); Top expressed in: Achilles tendon; islet of Langerhans; testicle; tibia; left testis; gallbladder; right testis; gonad; sural nerve; sperm / Top expressed in: interventricular septum; medullary collecting duct; right kidney; seminiferous tubule; endothelial cell of lymphatic vessel; temporal muscle; tail of embryo; proximal tubule; spermatid; otic placode; More reference expression data
BioGPS	More reference expression data
Gene ontology
Molecular function	PDZ domain binding; protein binding
Cellular component	plasma membrane; extracellular exosome; membrane
Biological process	protein-containing complex assembly
Sources:Amigo / QuickGO
Orthologs
Databases	NCBI: entry; OMA: entry
Species	Human	Mouse
Entrez	51678	56524
Ensembl	ENSG00000105926	ENSMUSG00000038388
UniProt	Q9NZW5	Q9JLB0
RefSeq (mRNA)	NM_001303037; NM_016447	NM_001164733; NM_001164734; NM_008016; NM_019939; NM_001361247 NM_001361248
RefSeq (protein)	NP_001289966; NP_057531	NP_001158205; NP_001158206; NP_064323; NP_001348176; NP_001348177
Location (UCSC)	Chr 7: 24.57 – 24.69 Mb	Chr 6: 50.09 – 50.18 Mb
PubMed search
- Wikidata
View/Edit Human	View/Edit Mouse

Protein PALS2 is a protein that in humans is encoded by the PALS2 gene (previously MPP6).

Members of the peripheral membrane-associated guanylate kinase (MAGUK) family function in tumor suppression and receptor clustering by forming multiprotein complexes containing distinct sets of transmembrane, cytoskeletal, and cytoplasmic signaling proteins. All MAGUKs contain a PDZ-SH3-GUK core and are divided into 4 subfamilies, DLG-like (see DLG1), ZO1-like (see TJP1), p55-like (see MPP1), and LIN2-like (see CASK), based on their size and the presence of additional domains. PALS2/MPP6 is a member of the p55-like MAGUK subfamily.

== See also ==
- PALS1
