= CNKSR2 =

Protein-coding gene in humans

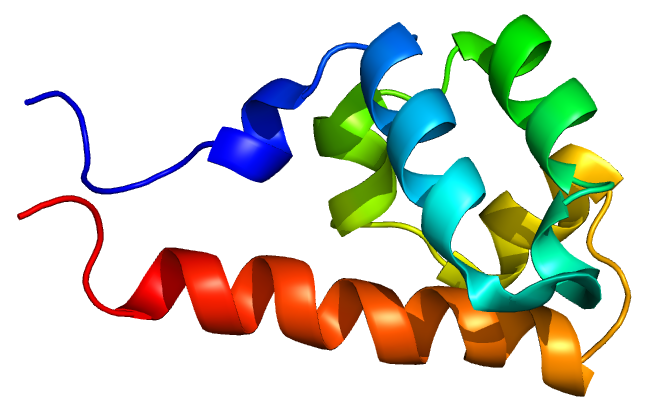

Identifiers
- Aliases: CNKSR2, CNK2, KSR2, MAGUIN, connector enhancer of kinase suppressor of Ras 2, MRXSHG
- External IDs: OMIM: 300724; MGI: 2661175; GeneCards: CNKSR2
Available structures
PDB	Ortholog search: PDBe RCSB
PDB	List of PDB id codes 2EAN, 3BS5

Gene location (Human)
Chr.	X chromosome (human)
Band	Xp22.12	Start	21,372,801 bp
Band	Xp22.12	End	21,654,695 bp

Gene location (Mouse)
Chr.	X chromosome (mouse)
Band	X|X F4	Start	156,604,432 bp
Band	X|X F4	End	156,826,290 bp
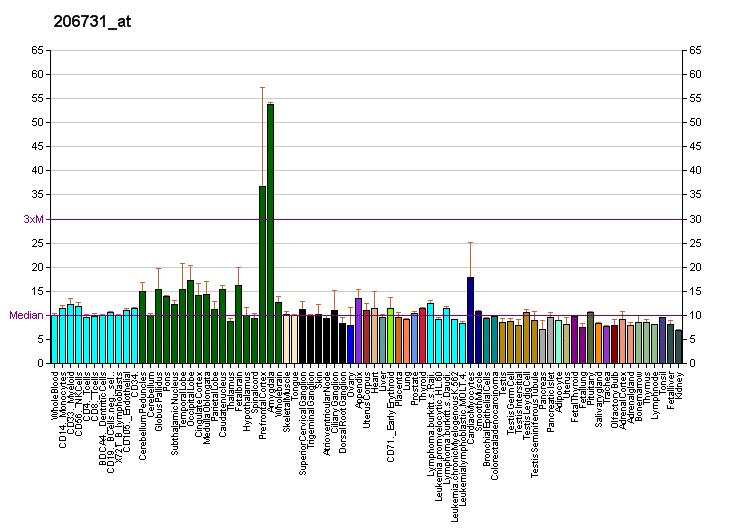
RNA expression pattern
Bgee	Human / Mouse (ortholog); Top expressed in: Brodmann area 23; cerebellar cortex; cerebellar hemisphere; superior frontal gyrus; primary visual cortex; postcentral gyrus; middle temporal gyrus; right hemisphere of cerebellum; buccal mucosa cell; entorhinal cortex / Top expressed in: primary visual cortex; superior frontal gyrus; dentate gyrus of hippocampal formation granule cell; nucleus accumbens; prefrontal cortex; genital tubercle; hippocampus proper; cerebellar cortex; Region I of hippocampus proper; dorsal striatum; More reference expression data
BioGPS	More reference expression data
Gene ontology
Molecular function	identical protein binding; protein binding
Cellular component	cytoplasm; neuron projection; soma; postsynaptic membrane; extracellular exosome; membrane; postsynaptic density; glutamatergic synapse; extrinsic component of postsynaptic density membrane
Biological process	regulation of signal transduction; postsynapse organization
Sources:Amigo / QuickGO
Orthologs
Databases	NCBI: entry; OMA: entry
Species	Human	Mouse
Entrez	22866	245684
Ensembl	ENSG00000149970	ENSMUSG00000025658
UniProt	Q8WXI2	Q80YA9
RefSeq (mRNA)	NM_001168647; NM_001168648; NM_001168649; NM_014927; NM_001330770 NM_001330771; NM_001330772; NM_001330773	NM_177751; NM_001310719; NM_001374835
RefSeq (protein)	NP_001162118; NP_001162119; NP_001162120; NP_001317699; NP_001317700 NP_001317701; NP_001317702; NP_055742	NP_001297648; NP_808419; NP_001361764
Location (UCSC)	Chr X: 21.37 – 21.65 Mb	Chr X: 156.6 – 156.83 Mb
PubMed search
- Wikidata
View/Edit Human	View/Edit Mouse

Connector enhancer of kinase suppressor of ras 2, also known as CNK homolog protein 2 (CNK2) or MAGUIN (membrane-associated guanylate kinase-interacting protein), is an enzyme that in humans is encoded by the CNKSR2 gene.

== Function ==
CNKSR2 is a multidomain protein that functions as a scaffold protein to mediate the mitogen-activated protein kinase pathways downstream from Ras. This gene product is induced by vitamin D and inhibits apoptosis in certain cancer cells. It may also play a role in ternary complex assembly of synaptic proteins at the postsynaptic membrane and coupling of signal transduction to membrane/cytoskeletal remodeling.

== Mechanism of action ==
It is the mammalian homolog of the Drosophila gene Cnk, which is known to bind Raf, and is implicated in ras signalling. It has been shown that CNKSR2 is also a Raf binding protein, and is assumed to function in bringing together the Ras signalling complex at the postsynaptic density.

It is known to have two isoforms, one of which binds PSD95 and S-SCAM (synaptic scaffolding molecule) through its PDZ domain, and another which does not. Both of the isoforms are, however, known to be synaptically localized, and it is understood that this is mediated by the Pleckstrin homology domain. It's synaptic localization is not known to be affected by NMDA receptor activation. Overexpression of MAGUIN's C-terminal PDZ domain is known to repress synaptic localization of PSD95. In cultures, MAGUIN colocalizes with PSD95 and synaptophysin at puncta in neurites, and these puncta are first visible at 6DIV.

Proteomic work done on binding partners of Ksr2 suggests that the CNKSR2/KSR2 complex may play a role in mediating crosstalk between the MAPK, Pi3K and insulin pathways. It was found to form a complex with MEK1 (Erk2, p38), MEK2, cdk4, PI3k, the phosphatases PP2A and PP^, and also various translational, ribosomal, transport and structural proteins. It remains to be established how many of these are affected by CNKSR2, and whether this remains true for Ksr2 in the nervous system.

Densin-180 is another important synaptic protein found to interact with CNKSR2. It is known to bind at its C-terminal PDZ domain. In transfected cells, no association could be found between PSD95 and Densin-180 without the presence of CNKSR2. This brings it into a complex with CamKII and β-catenin, and further to the binding partners of CNKSR2 suggest that CNKSR2 may have a role in dendritic branching.

== Mutation ==
Deletions of this gene on the X-chromosome of males leads to intellectual disability and epileptic seizures.
