= LMO7 =

Protein-coding gene in the species Homo sapiens

Identifiers
- Aliases: LMO7, FBX20, FBXO20, LOMP, LIM domain 7, LMO7b
- External IDs: OMIM: 604362; MGI: 1353586; GeneCards: LMO7
Available structures
PDB	Human UniProt search: PDBe RCSB
PDB	List of PDB id codes 2EAQ

Gene location (Human)
Chr.	Chromosome 13 (human)
Band	13q22.2	Start	75,620,434 bp
Band	13q22.2	End	75,859,870 bp

Gene location (Mouse)
Chr.	Chromosome 14 (mouse)
Band	14 E2.3|14 50.9 cM	Start	101,729,957 bp
Band	14 E2.3|14 50.9 cM	End	101,934,710 bp
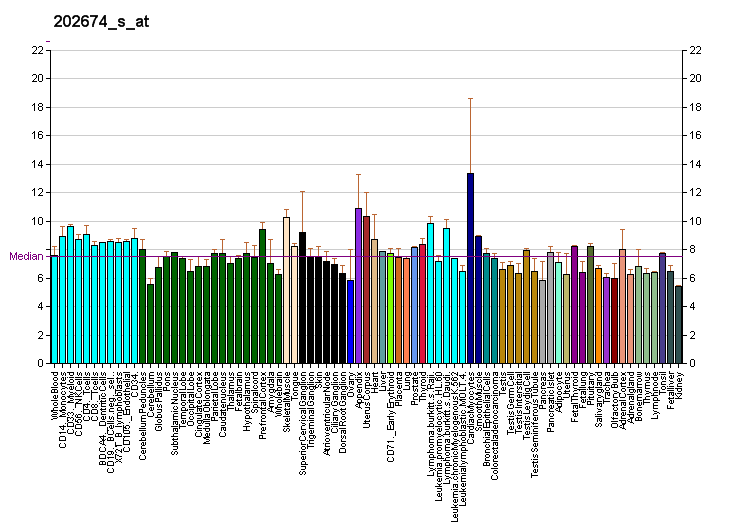
RNA expression pattern
Bgee	Human / Mouse (ortholog); Top expressed in: sural nerve; apex of heart; right lung; upper lobe of left lung; right auricle of heart; Achilles tendon; left lobe of thyroid gland; right lobe of thyroid gland; olfactory zone of nasal mucosa; stromal cell of endometrium / Top expressed in: zygote; secondary oocyte; Ileal epithelium; cardiac muscle tissue of left ventricle; primary oocyte; corneal stroma; interventricular septum; left lung lobe; conjunctival fornix; right lung lobe; More reference expression data
BioGPS	More reference expression data
Gene ontology
Molecular function	metal ion binding; ubiquitin-protein transferase activity; DNA-binding transcription factor activity
Cellular component	cytoplasm; ubiquitin ligase complex; nucleus; focal adhesion; cytosol; nuclear envelope; cell surface; apical plasma membrane
Biological process	regulation of cell adhesion; protein ubiquitination; regulation of signaling; protein polyubiquitination; post-translational protein modification; positive regulation of transcription by RNA polymerase II
Sources:Amigo / QuickGO
Orthologs
Databases	NCBI: entry; OMA: entry
Species	Human	Mouse
Entrez	4008	380928
Ensembl	ENSG00000136153	ENSMUSG00000033060
UniProt	Q8WWI1	n/a
RefSeq (mRNA)	NM_001306080; NM_005358; NM_015842; NM_015843; NM_001330583	NM_201529; NM_001347628
RefSeq (protein)	NP_001293009; NP_001317512; NP_005349; NP_056667; NP_001353561 NP_001353562; NP_001353563; NP_001353565; NP_001293009.1	n/a
Location (UCSC)	Chr 13: 75.62 – 75.86 Mb	Chr 14: 101.73 – 101.93 Mb
PubMed search
- Wikidata
View/Edit Human	View/Edit Mouse

LIM domain only protein 7 is a protein that in humans is encoded by the LMO7 gene.

This gene encodes a protein containing a calponin homology (CH) domain, a PDZ domain, and a LIM domain. An F-box (FBX) domain is present in alternative splice variants. Members of the LIM protein family carry the LIM domain, a unique cysteine-rich zinc-binding domain. Members of the FBX protein family are involved in protein-protein interactions. The encoded protein may be involved in protein-protein interactions. Multiple alternative splice variants have been described but their full-length sequences have not been determined.
