= SHROOM3 =

Protein-coding gene in the species Homo sapiens

Identifiers
- Aliases: SHROOM3, APXL3, SHRM, ShrmL, MSTP013, shroom family member 3
- External IDs: OMIM: 604570; MGI: 1351655; GeneCards: SHROOM3

Gene location (Human)
Chr.	Chromosome 4 (human)
Band	4q21.1	Start	76,435,229 bp
Band	4q21.1	End	76,783,253 bp

Gene location (Mouse)
Chr.	Chromosome 5 (mouse)
Band	5 E2|5 47.29 cM	Start	92,831,294 bp
Band	5 E2|5 47.29 cM	End	93,113,177 bp
RNA expression pattern
Bgee	Human / Mouse (ortholog); Top expressed in: mucosa of ileum; pancreatic epithelial cell; pancreatic ductal cell; bronchial epithelial cell; ventricular zone; corpus epididymis; retinal pigment epithelium; sural nerve; mucosa of colon; mucosa of sigmoid colon / Top expressed in: Ileal epithelium; lumbar spinal ganglion; medullary collecting duct; Paneth cell; left colon; submandibular gland; epithelium of stomach; ascending aorta; aortic valve; right lung; More reference expression data
BioGPS	n/a
Gene ontology
Molecular function	actin filament binding; actin binding
Cellular component	apical plasma membrane; cell junction; adherens junction; cytoplasm; apical junction complex; microtubule; cytoskeleton; cortical actin cytoskeleton
Biological process	cellular pigment accumulation; multicellular organism development; apical protein localization; regulation of cell shape; neural tube closure; epithelial cell development; pattern specification process; cell morphogenesis; actin filament organization; actin cytoskeleton organization
Sources:Amigo / QuickGO
Orthologs
Databases	NCBI: entry; OMA: entry
Species	Human	Mouse
Entrez	57619	27428
Ensembl	ENSG00000138771	ENSMUSG00000029381
UniProt	Q8TF72	Q9QXN0
RefSeq (mRNA)	NM_020859	NM_001077595; NM_001077596; NM_015756
RefSeq (protein)	NP_065910	NP_001071063; NP_001071064; NP_056571
Location (UCSC)	Chr 4: 76.44 – 76.78 Mb	Chr 5: 92.83 – 93.11 Mb
PubMed search
- Wikidata
View/Edit Human	View/Edit Mouse

Protein shroom3 also known as shroom-related protein is a protein that in humans is encoded by the SHROOM3 gene.

Protein shroom3 is a PDZ domain-containing protein that belongs to a family of Shroom-related proteins. This protein may be involved in regulating cell shape in certain tissues.

== Clinical relevance ==
Mutations in this gene have been shown to cause heterotaxy. A similar protein in mice is required for proper neurulation, eye, and gut development.
