= PALS1 =

Protein-coding gene in the species Homo sapiens

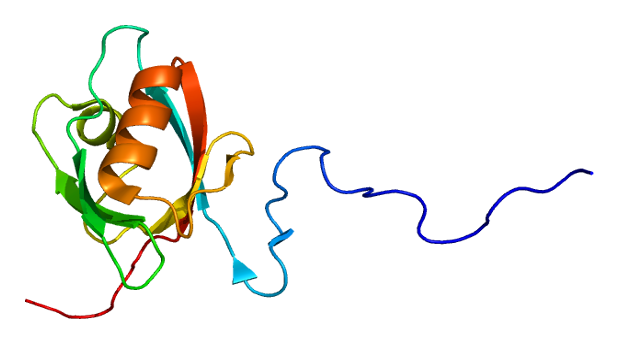

Identifiers
- Aliases: PALS1, membrane palmitoylated protein 5, protein associated with LIN7 1, MAGUK p55 family member, MPP5, protein associated with LIN7 1, MAGUK family member
- External IDs: OMIM: 606958; MGI: 1927339; GeneCards: PALS1
Available structures
| PDB | Ortholog search: PDBe RCSB |
| PDB | List of PDB id codes 1Y76, 3UIT, 4UU5, 4UU6, 4WSI |

Gene location (Human)
| Chr. | Chromosome 14 (human) |
| Band | 14q23.3 | Start | 67,240,713 bp |
| Band | 14q23.3 | End | 67,336,061 bp |

Gene location (Mouse)
| Chr. | Chromosome 12 (mouse) |
| Band | 12|12 C3 | Start | 78,795,681 bp |
| Band | 12|12 C3 | End | 78,887,488 bp |
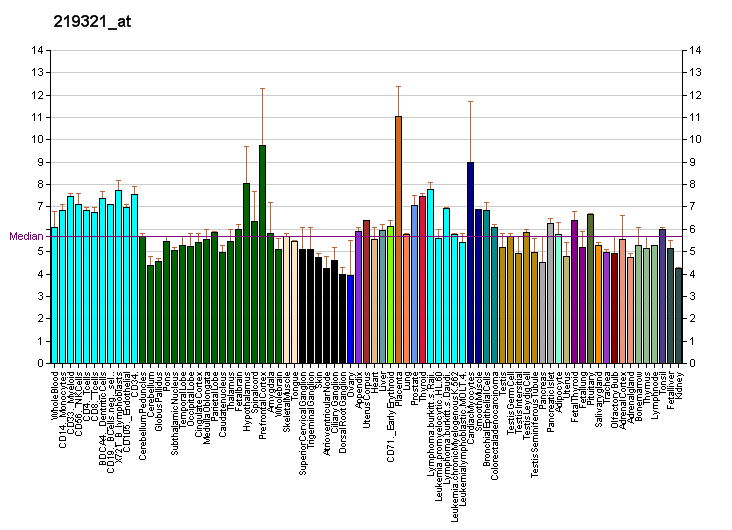
RNA expression pattern
| Bgee | Human / Mouse (ortholog); Top expressed in: jejunal mucosa; ventricular zone; germinal epithelium; retinal pigment epithelium; corpus callosum; inferior ganglion of vagus nerve; biceps brachii; Skeletal muscle tissue of biceps brachii; amniotic fluid; corpus epididymis / Top expressed in: zygote; tail of embryo; spermatid; otic placode; genital tubercle; saccule; secondary oocyte; otic vesicle; left lung lobe; epithelium of small intestine; More reference expression data |
| BioGPS | More reference expression data |
Gene ontology
| Molecular function | protein domain specific binding; protein binding |
| Cellular component | cytoplasm; membrane; bicellular tight junction; myelin sheath adaxonal region; Schmidt-Lanterman incisure; cell junction; lateral loop; extracellular exosome; endomembrane system; plasma membrane; protein-containing complex |
| Biological process | establishment of epithelial cell polarity; peripheral nervous system myelin maintenance; protein localization to myelin sheath abaxonal region; myelin assembly; bicellular tight junction assembly; plasma membrane organization; morphogenesis of an epithelial sheet; protein localization to plasma membrane |
Sources:Amigo / QuickGO
Orthologs
| Databases | NCBI: entry; OMA: entry |
| Species | Human | Mouse |
| Entrez | 64398 | 56217 |
| Ensembl | ENSG00000072415 | ENSMUSG00000021112 |
| UniProt | Q8N3R9 | Q9JLB2 |
| RefSeq (mRNA) | NM_001256550; NM_022474 | NM_019579 |
| RefSeq (protein) | NP_001243479; NP_071919 | NP_062525 |
| Location (UCSC) | Chr 14: 67.24 – 67.34 Mb | Chr 12: 78.8 – 78.89 Mb |
| PubMed search |
- Wikidata
| View/Edit Human | View/Edit Mouse |

Protein PALS1 is a protein that in humans is encoded by the PALS1 gene (previously MPP5).

Members of the peripheral membrane-associated guanylate kinase (MAGUK) family function in tumor suppression and receptor clustering by forming multiprotein complexes containing distinct sets of transmembrane, cytoskeletal, and cytoplasmic signaling proteins. All MAGUKs contain a PDZ-SH3-GUK core and are divided into 4 subfamilies, DLG-like (eg: DLG1), ZO1-like (eg: TJP1), p55-like (eg: MPP1), and LIN2-like (eg: CASK), based on their size and the presence of additional domains. PALS1/MPP5 is a member of the p55-like MAGUK subfamily.

== Interactions ==
The PALS1 protein has been shown to interact with INADL and FAM71D.

== See also ==
- PALS2
