= PKN2 =

Protein-coding gene in humans

Identifiers
- Aliases: PKN2, PAK2, PRK2, PRKCL2, PRO2042, Pak-2, STK7, protein kinase N2
- External IDs: OMIM: 602549; MGI: 109211; GeneCards: PKN2
Available structures
PDB	Ortholog search: PDBe RCSB
PDB	List of PDB id codes 4CRS, 4RRV
Enzyme activity
EC #	BRENDA	ExPASy	KEGG	MetaCyc
2.7.11.13	↗	↗	↗	↗

Gene location (Human)
Chr.	Chromosome 1 (human)
Band	1p22.2	Start	88,684,222 bp
Band	1p22.2	End	88,836,255 bp

Gene location (Mouse)
Chr.	Chromosome 3 (mouse)
Band	3 H1|3 66.69 cM	Start	142,496,663 bp
Band	3 H1|3 66.69 cM	End	142,587,765 bp
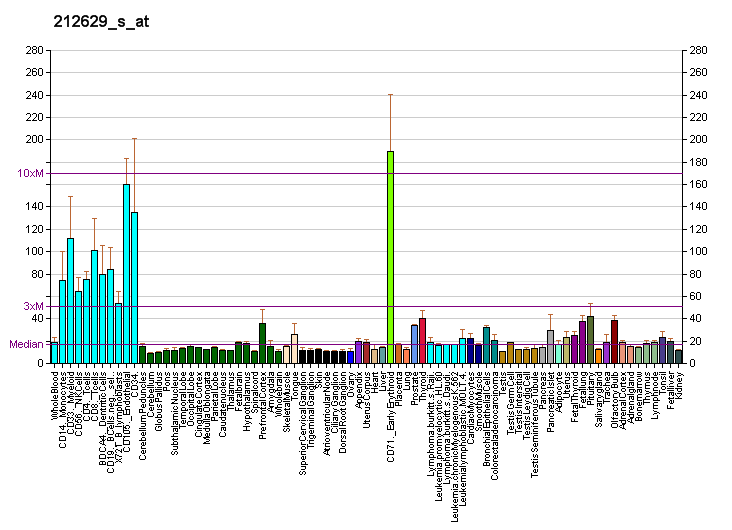

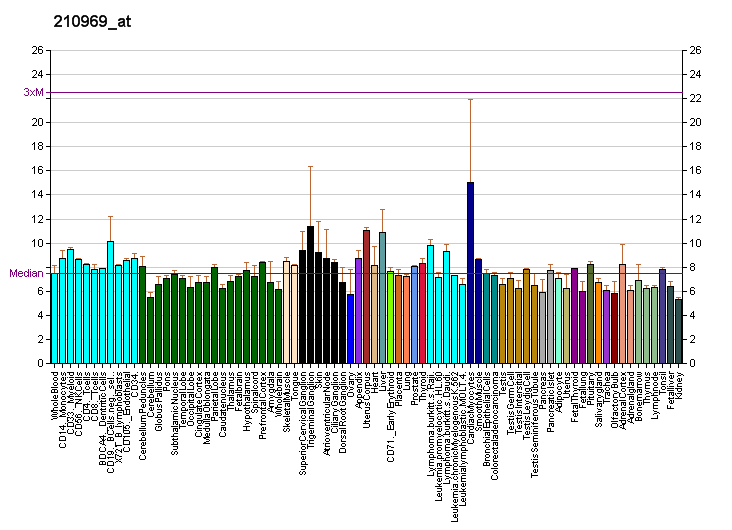

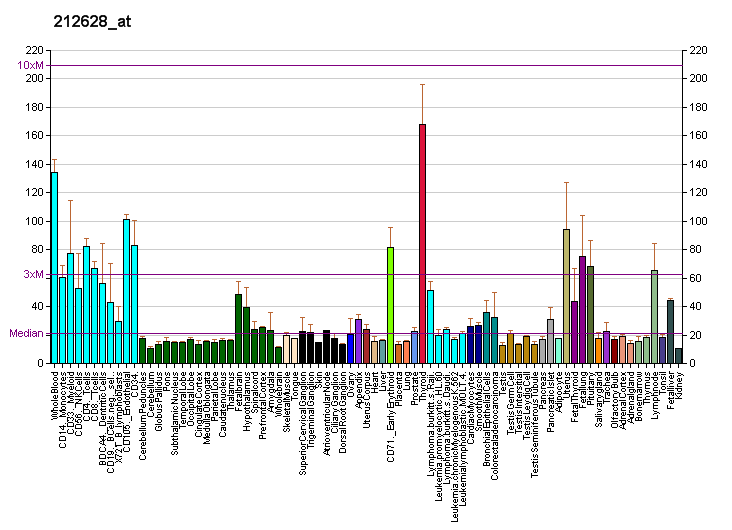
RNA expression pattern
Bgee	Human / Mouse (ortholog); Top expressed in: nipple; secondary oocyte; parotid gland; pylorus; jejunal mucosa; Achilles tendon; visceral pleura; amniotic fluid; cardia; trabecular bone / Top expressed in: superior cervical ganglion; medullary collecting duct; spermatid; tail of embryo; spermatocyte; genital tubercle; renal corpuscle; secondary oocyte; zygote; urothelium; More reference expression data
BioGPS	More reference expression data
Gene ontology
Molecular function	transferase activity; protein kinase activity; nucleotide binding; protein kinase C activity; histone deacetylase binding; kinase activity; protein serine/threonine kinase activity; protein binding; RNA polymerase binding; ATP binding; RNA binding; cadherin binding
Cellular component	cytoplasm; cytosol; cell projection; membrane; midbody; perinuclear region of cytoplasm; cleavage furrow; cytoskeleton; apical junction complex; nucleus; lamellipodium; cell junction; nucleoplasm; centrosome; plasma membrane; nuclear body; protein-containing complex; intermediate filament cytoskeleton
Biological process	intracellular signal transduction; regulation of transcription, DNA-templated; phosphorylation; positive regulation of mitotic cell cycle; transcription, DNA-templated; positive regulation of cytokinesis; cell division; regulation of cell motility; protein phosphorylation; cell adhesion; peptidyl-serine phosphorylation; epithelial cell migration; cell cycle; positive regulation of viral genome replication; apical junction assembly; signal transduction; apoptotic process; cell projection organization; viral process
Sources:Amigo / QuickGO
Orthologs
Databases	NCBI: entry; OMA: entry
Species	Human	Mouse
Entrez	5586	109333
Ensembl	ENSG00000065243	ENSMUSG00000004591
UniProt	Q16513	Q8BWW9
RefSeq (mRNA)	NM_006256; NM_001320707; NM_001320708; NM_001320709	NM_178654
RefSeq (protein)	NP_001307636; NP_001307637; NP_001307638; NP_006247	NP_848769
Location (UCSC)	Chr 1: 88.68 – 88.84 Mb	Chr 3: 142.5 – 142.59 Mb
PubMed search
- Wikidata
View/Edit Human	View/Edit Mouse

Serine/threonine-protein kinase N2 is an enzyme that in humans and Strongylocentrotus purpuratus is encoded by the PKN2 gene.

== Interactions ==
PKN2 has been shown to interact with:

- AKT1,
- NCK1,
- PTPN13,
- Phosphoinositide-dependent kinase-1, and
- RHOA.
