= Tax1 =

The Tax1 is a PDZ domain containing oncoprotein encoded by HTLV-1.

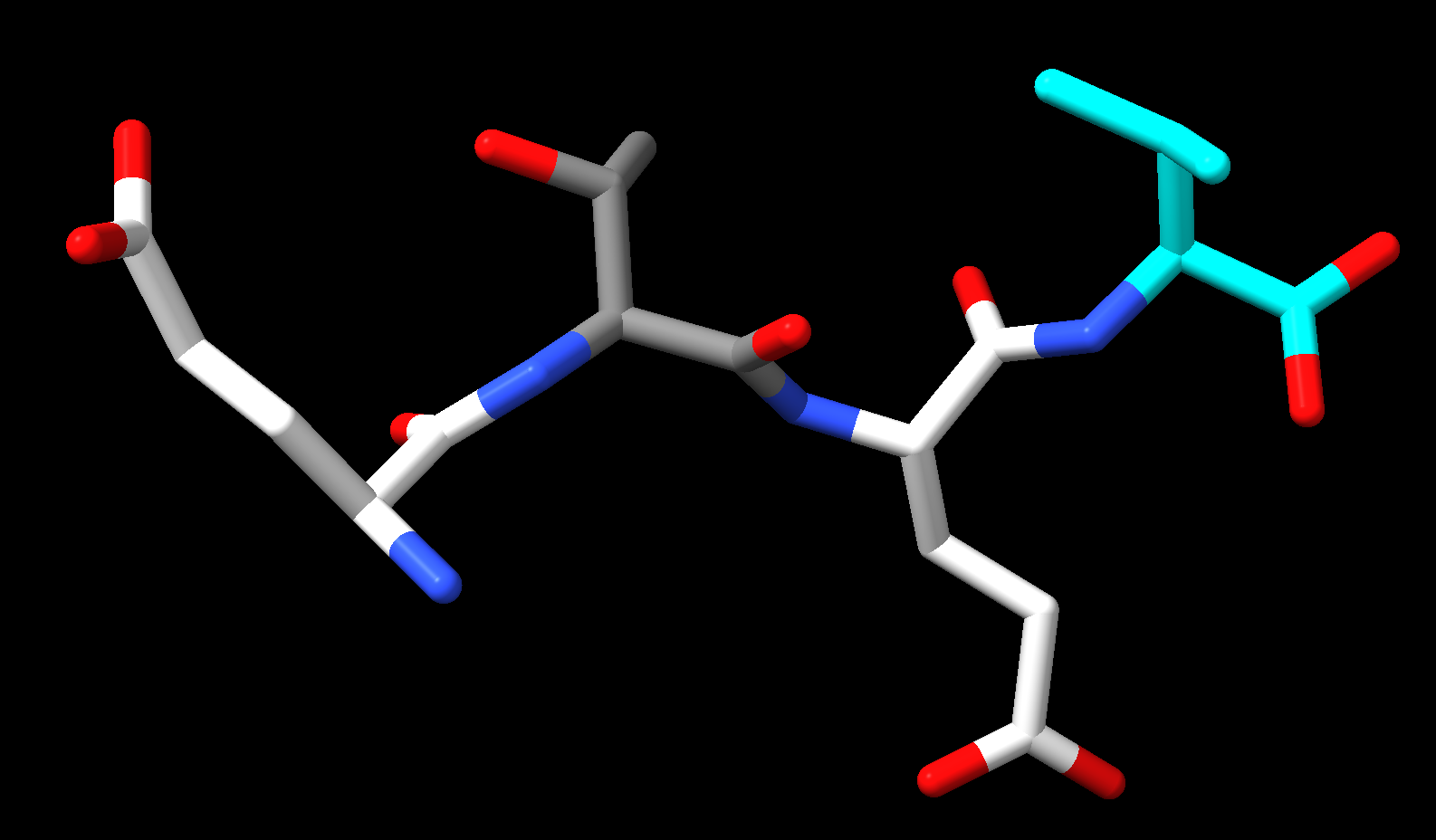
This figure shows the 3D structure of the sixth member of the Tax1 protein family, characterized by a repetitive glutamate-threonine–glutamate–valine nucleotide sequence located at the C-terminus. The ETEV sequence (glutamate–threonine–glutamate–valine) is a conserved sequence in Tax1 that forms the PDZ-binding motif (PBM).

== Disruption of tumor suppressors ==
Tax1 disrupts tumor suppressor pathways by using its PDZ-binding motif to interact with key scaffolding proteins such as Scribble and Erbin.

=== Summary ===
Tax1 contains a conserved PDZ-binding motif at its C-terminus that allows it to bind multiple PDZ domains in host proteins. These interactions interfere with tumor suppressor functions, disrupting epithelial cell polarity through Scribble and enhancing growth signaling via Erbin. By mimicking endogenous ligands, Tax1 alters normal scaffolding networks, contributing to abnormal cell proliferation through pathways like Ras–Raf–MEK–ERK. Structural studies show that Tax1 binds each PDZ domain in Scribble with distinct affinities and can compete with native proteins. The interaction is also subject to regulation through phosphorylation, revealing a potential control point in this oncogenic mechanism.

=== Structural features of the PDZ-binding motif ===
The PDZ-binding motif of Tax1 is a short amino acid sequence located at its C-terminus that fits a common class I motif, usually ending in threonine–glutamate–valine. This conserved structure allows Tax1 to bind with high specificity to PDZ domains—modular protein regions involved in organizing signaling complexes. Tax1's PDZ binding motif mimics cellular ligands, enabling it to fit into the grooves of multiple PDZ domains without requiring major conformational changes.

=== Scribble binding and loss of cell polarity ===
Scribble is a scaffold protein that helps maintain cell polarity and limits cell growth. Tax1 binds all four of Scribble's PDZ domains with differing strengths: PDZ1 (KD = 7.8 μM), PDZ2 (15.4 μM), PDZ3 (9.1 μM), and PDZ4 (40.2 μM). These interactions prevent Scribble from forming complexes with its normal partners, such as β-PIX and Vangl2, leading to disrupted polarity signaling. As a result, Scribble becomes mislocalized within the cell, weakening its tumor suppressor role. Research also shows that phosphorylation of Tax1 at a specific threonine residue (Thr351) reduces its ability to bind PDZ domains, indicating that this interaction may be regulated by cellular signaling.

=== Interaction with Erbin and enhanced growth signaling ===
Erbin is another PDZ domain-containing tumor suppressor that plays a role in localizing and regulating the Ras–Raf–MEK–ERK pathway, a major driver of cell growth. In cells where Erbin is present, Tax1 binding leads to increased activation of Ras and Raf proteins, enhancing downstream ERK signaling. This sustained activation can drive cell division beyond normal controls and supports the growth of transformed cells.

=== Conclusion ===
Tax1 hijacks host signaling networks by using its conserved C-terminal PDZ-binding motif to bind tumor suppressor proteins like Scribble and Erbin. These interactions disrupt pathways responsible for cell polarity and growth regulation, including the Ras–Raf–MEK–ERK signaling cascade. By mimicking cellular ligands and targeting PDZ domains with specific binding affinities, Tax1 reprograms scaffolding proteins in a way that supports oncogenic transformation.
