= FRMPD3 =

Protein-coding gene in the species Homo sapiens

Identifiers
- Aliases: FRMPD3, FERM and PDZ domain containing 3
- External IDs: OMIM: 301005; MGI: 3646547; GeneCards: FRMPD3

Gene location (Human)
Chr.	X chromosome (human)
Band	Xq22.3	Start	107,449,652 bp
Band	Xq22.3	End	107,605,255 bp

Gene location (Mouse)
Chr.	X chromosome (mouse)
Band	X F1|X	Start	140,342,263 bp
Band	X F1|X	End	140,435,467 bp
RNA expression pattern
Bgee	Human / Mouse (ortholog); Top expressed in: testicle; right hemisphere of cerebellum; right lobe of thyroid gland; left lobe of thyroid gland; granulocyte; hypothalamus; cingulate gyrus; anterior cingulate cortex; endothelial cell; right frontal lobe / Top expressed in: lumbar subsegment of spinal cord; subiculum; dorsal tegmental nucleus; dorsomedial hypothalamic nucleus; Region I of hippocampus proper; central gray substance of midbrain; superior colliculus; suprachiasmatic nucleus; lateral hypothalamus; medial vestibular nucleus; More reference expression data
BioGPS	n/a
Orthologs
Databases	NCBI: entry; OMA: entry
Species	Human	Mouse
Entrez	84443	245643
Ensembl	ENSG00000147234	ENSMUSG00000042425
UniProt	Q5JV73	A0A140LIW3
RefSeq (mRNA)	NM_032428; NM_001388459; NM_001388462	NM_177750; NM_001320946
RefSeq (protein)	NP_115804	NP_001307875; NP_001375383; NP_001375384; NP_001375385; NP_001375386 NP_001375387
Location (UCSC)	Chr X: 107.45 – 107.61 Mb	Chr X: 140.34 – 140.44 Mb
PubMed search
- Wikidata
View/Edit Human	View/Edit Mouse

FERM and PDZ domain containing 3 is a protein that in humans is encoded by the FRMPD3 gene.
