= RHPN1 =

Protein-coding gene in the species Homo sapiens

Identifiers
- Aliases: RHPN1, ODF5, RHOPHILIN, RHPN, rhophilin, Rho GTPase binding protein 1, rhophilin Rho GTPase binding protein 1
- External IDs: OMIM: 601031; MGI: 1098783; GeneCards: RHPN1

Gene location (Human)
| Chr. | Chromosome 8 (human) |
| Band | 8q24.3 | Start | 143,368,876 bp |
| Band | 8q24.3 | End | 143,384,221 bp |

Gene location (Mouse)
| Chr. | Chromosome 15 (mouse) |
| Band | 15|15 D3 | Start | 75,576,129 bp |
| Band | 15|15 D3 | End | 75,587,334 bp |
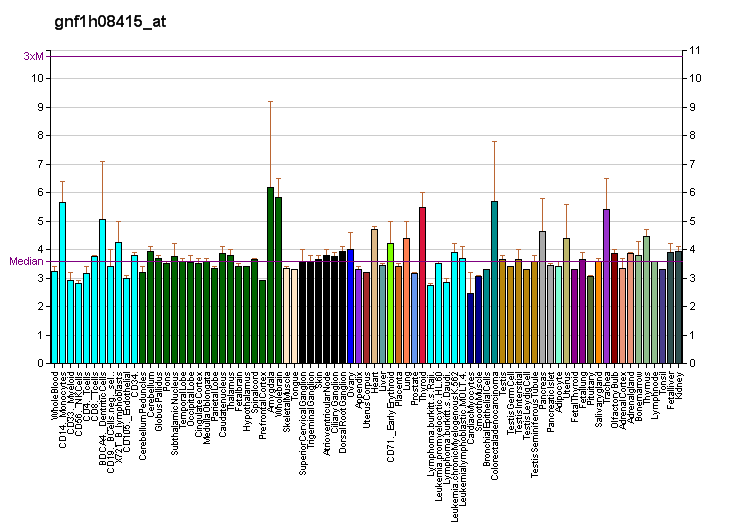

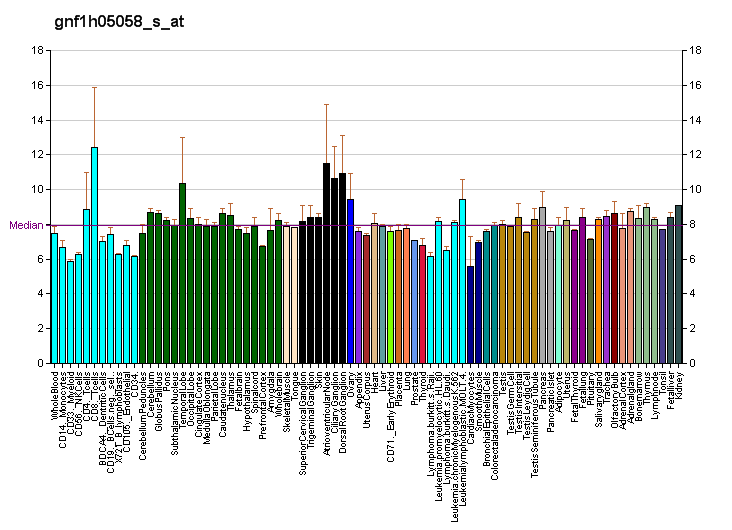
RNA expression pattern
| Bgee | Human / Mouse (ortholog); Top expressed in: right lobe of thyroid gland; left lobe of thyroid gland; anterior pituitary; right uterine tube; right frontal lobe; nucleus accumbens; Brodmann area 9; amygdala; cingulate gyrus; anterior cingulate cortex / Top expressed in: saccule; neural layer of retina; spermatocyte; otic vesicle; right kidney; spermatid; otic placode; proximal tubule; renal corpuscle; ventricular zone; More reference expression data |
| BioGPS | More reference expression data |
Gene ontology
| Molecular function | protein binding |
| Cellular component | cytosol |
| Biological process | signal transduction |
Sources:Amigo / QuickGO
Orthologs
| Databases | NCBI: entry; OMA: entry |
| Species | Human | Mouse |
| Entrez | 114822 | 14787 |
| Ensembl | ENSG00000158106 | ENSMUSG00000022580 |
| UniProt | Q8TCX5 | Q61085 |
| RefSeq (mRNA) | NM_052924 | NM_001163465; NM_008164 |
| RefSeq (protein) | NP_443156 | NP_001156937; NP_032190 |
| Location (UCSC) | Chr 8: 143.37 – 143.38 Mb | Chr 15: 75.58 – 75.59 Mb |
| PubMed search |
- Wikidata
| View/Edit Human | View/Edit Mouse |

Rhophilin-1 is a protein that in humans is encoded by the RHPN1 gene.
