= FERM and PDZ domain containing 2 =

Protein-coding gene in the species Homo sapiens

FRMPD2

Identifiers
- Aliases: FRMPD2, PDZD5C, PDZK4, PDZK5C, FERM and PDZ domain containing 2
- External IDs: OMIM: 613323; MGI: 2685472; GeneCards: FRMPD2

Gene location (Human)
Chr.	Chromosome 10 (human)
Band	10q11.22	Start	48,153,088 bp
Band	10q11.22	End	48,274,696 bp

Gene location (Mouse)
Chr.	Chromosome 14 (mouse)
Band	14|14 B	Start	33,193,653 bp
Band	14|14 B	End	33,297,226 bp
RNA expression pattern
Bgee	Human / Mouse (ortholog); Top expressed in: superior frontal gyrus; testicle; dorsolateral prefrontal cortex; Brodmann area 9; right frontal lobe; cingulate gyrus; anterior cingulate cortex; right uterine tube; olfactory zone of nasal mucosa; corpus callosum / Top expressed in: neural layer of retina; retinal pigment epithelium; pineal gland; epithelium of lens; secondary oocyte; zygote; ciliary body; autonomic nervous system; greater petrosal nerve; primary oocyte; More reference expression data
BioGPS	n/a
Gene ontology
Molecular function	protein binding; 1-phosphatidylinositol binding
Cellular component	membrane; cell junction; cytoskeleton; cytoplasm; plasma membrane; basolateral plasma membrane; bicellular tight junction
Biological process	bicellular tight junction assembly
Sources:Amigo / QuickGO
Orthologs
Databases	NCBI: entry; OMA: entry
Species	Human	Mouse
Entrez	143162	268729
Ensembl	ENSG00000170324	ENSMUSG00000108841
UniProt	Q68DX3	n/a
RefSeq (mRNA)	NM_001017929; NM_001018071; NM_001042512; NM_152428; NM_001318191	XM_017316244; XM_036158980; XM_036158982
RefSeq (protein)	NP_001018081; NP_001035977; NP_001305120	n/a
Location (UCSC)	Chr 10: 48.15 – 48.27 Mb	Chr 14: 33.19 – 33.3 Mb
PubMed search
- Wikidata
View/Edit Human	View/Edit Mouse

FERM and PDZ domain containing 2 is a protein that in humans is encoded by the FRMPD2 gene.

== Function ==
This gene encodes a peripheral membrane protein and is located in a region of chromosome 10q that contains a segmental duplication. This copy of the gene is full-length and is in the telomeric duplicated region. Two other more centromerically proximal copies of the gene are partial and may represent pseudogenes. This full-length gene appears to function in the establishment and maintenance of cell polarization. The protein is recruited to cell-cell junctions in an E-cadherin-dependent manner, and is selectively localized at the basolateral membrane in polarized epithelial cells. Alternative splicing results in multiple transcript variants.
