= PTPN4 =

Protein-coding gene in the species Homo sapiens

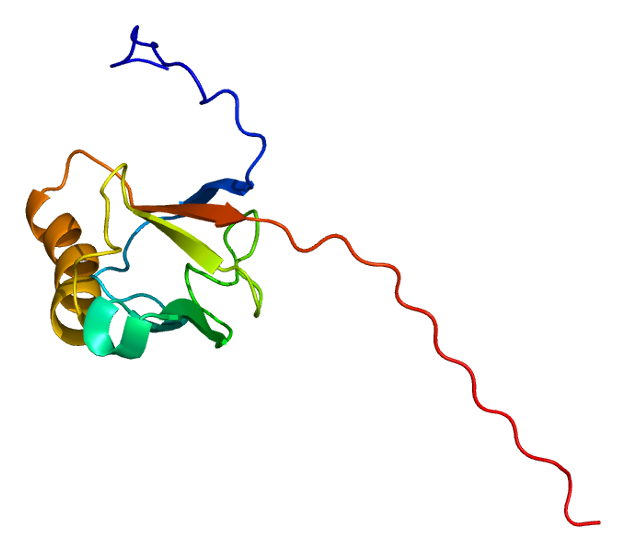

Identifiers
- Aliases: PTPN4, MEG, PTPMEG, PTPMEG1, protein tyrosine phosphatase, non-receptor type 4, protein tyrosine phosphatase non-receptor type 4
- External IDs: OMIM: 176878; MGI: 1099792; GeneCards: PTPN4
Available structures
PDB	Ortholog search: PDBe RCSB
PDB	List of PDB id codes 2CS5, 2VPH, 3NFK, 3NFL, 2I75, 5EZ0, 5EYZ
Enzyme activity
EC #	BRENDA	ExPASy	KEGG	MetaCyc
3.1.3.48	↗	↗	↗	↗

Gene location (Human)
Chr.	Chromosome 2 (human)
Band	2q14.2	Start	119,759,922 bp
Band	2q14.2	End	119,984,899 bp

Gene location (Mouse)
Chr.	Chromosome 1 (mouse)
Band	1 E2.3|1 52.39 cM	Start	119,652,467 bp
Band	1 E2.3|1 52.39 cM	End	119,837,613 bp
RNA expression pattern
Bgee	Human / Mouse (ortholog); Top expressed in: lateral nuclear group of thalamus; granulocyte; cerebellar vermis; Achilles tendon; renal medulla; paraflocculus of cerebellum; Skeletal muscle tissue of rectus abdominis; corpus callosum; parietal lobe; pons / Top expressed in: lateral geniculate nucleus; medial geniculate nucleus; medial dorsal nucleus; cerebellar vermis; lobe of cerebellum; Region I of hippocampus proper; triceps brachii muscle; spermatid; superior colliculus; temporal muscle; More reference expression data
BioGPS	n/a
Gene ontology
Molecular function	protein tyrosine phosphatase activity; phosphatase activity; cytoskeletal protein binding; protein binding; phosphoprotein phosphatase activity; hydrolase activity; non-membrane spanning protein tyrosine phosphatase activity
Cellular component	cytoplasm; cytoplasmic side of plasma membrane; plasma membrane; cytoskeleton; membrane; nucleoplasm; cytosol
Biological process	protein dephosphorylation; peptidyl-tyrosine dephosphorylation; dephosphorylation; cellular response to cytokine stimulus
Sources:Amigo / QuickGO
Orthologs
Databases	NCBI: entry; OMA: entry
Species	Human	Mouse
Entrez	5775	19258
Ensembl	ENSG00000088179	ENSMUSG00000026384
UniProt	P29074	Q9WU22
RefSeq (mRNA)	NM_002830	NM_019933
RefSeq (protein)	NP_002821	NP_064317
Location (UCSC)	Chr 2: 119.76 – 119.98 Mb	Chr 1: 119.65 – 119.84 Mb
PubMed search
- Wikidata
View/Edit Human	View/Edit Mouse

Tyrosine-protein phosphatase non-receptor type 4 is an enzyme that in humans is encoded by the PTPN4 gene.

== Function ==
The protein encoded by this gene is a member of the protein tyrosine phosphatase (PTP) family. PTPs are known to be signaling molecules that regulate a variety of cellular processes including cell growth, differentiation, mitotic cycle, and oncogenic transformation. This protein contains a C-terminal PTP domain and an N-terminal domain homologous to the band 4.1 superfamily of cytoskeletal-associated proteins. This PTP has been shown to interact with glutamate receptor delta 2 and epsilon subunits, and is thought to play a role in signalling downstream of the glutamate receptors through tyrosine dephosphorylation.

== Interactions ==
PTPN4 has been shown to interact with GRID2.
