= SIPA1L2 =

Protein-coding gene in humans

Identifiers
- Aliases: SIPA1L2, SPAL2, signal induced proliferation associated 1 like 2, SPAR2
- External IDs: OMIM: 611609; MGI: 2676970; GeneCards: SIPA1L2

Gene location (Human)
Chr.	Chromosome 1 (human)
Band	1q42.2	Start	232,397,965 bp
Band	1q42.2	End	232,630,571 bp

Gene location (Mouse)
Chr.	Chromosome 8 (mouse)
Band	8|8 E2	Start	126,144,802 bp
Band	8|8 E2	End	126,296,547 bp
RNA expression pattern
Bgee	Human / Mouse (ortholog); Top expressed in: myocardium of left ventricle; cardiac muscle tissue of right atrium; pons; decidua; right ventricle; lateral nuclear group of thalamus; buccal mucosa cell; sural nerve; middle temporal gyrus; pars compacta / Top expressed in: pontine nuclei; habenula; granulocyte; secondary oocyte; gastrula; endocardial cushion; dentate gyrus; medulla oblongata; lumbar subsegment of spinal cord; dentate gyrus of hippocampal formation granule cell; More reference expression data
BioGPS	n/a
Gene ontology
Molecular function	protein binding; GTPase activator activity
Cellular component	cellular component
Biological process	positive regulation of GTPase activity; regulation of small GTPase mediated signal transduction; biological process
Sources:Amigo / QuickGO
Orthologs
Databases	NCBI: entry; OMA: entry
Species	Human	Mouse
Entrez	57568	244668
Ensembl	ENSG00000116991	ENSMUSG00000001995
UniProt	Q9P2F8	Q80TE4
RefSeq (mRNA)	NM_020808; NM_001377488	NM_001081337; NM_001357372
RefSeq (protein)	NP_065859; NP_001364417	NP_001074806; NP_001344301
Location (UCSC)	Chr 1: 232.4 – 232.63 Mb	Chr 8: 126.14 – 126.3 Mb
PubMed search
- Wikidata
View/Edit Human	View/Edit Mouse

Signal-induced proliferation-associated 1-like protein 2 is a protein that in humans is encoded by the SIPA1L2 gene.
