= PPP1R9A =

Protein-coding gene in the species Homo sapiens

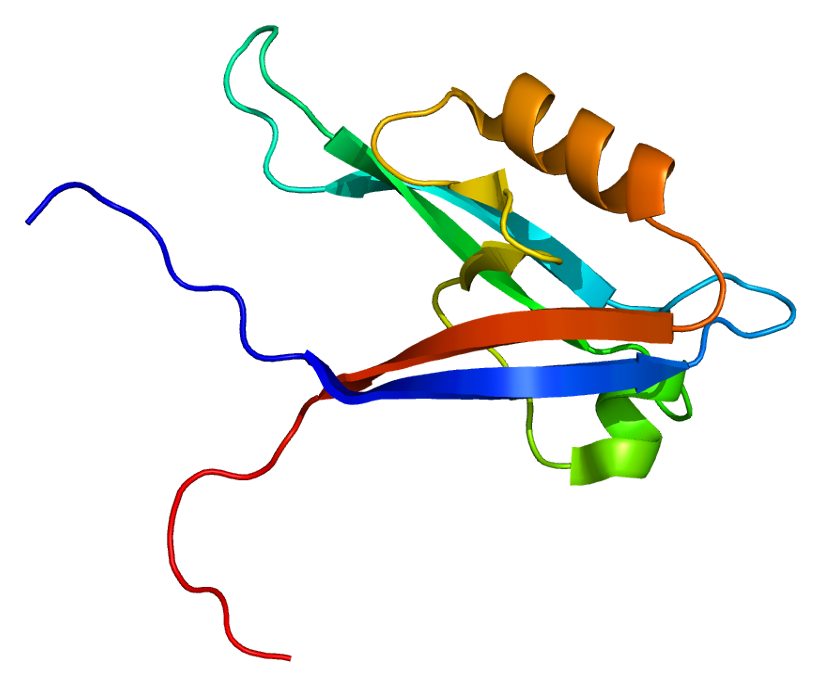

Identifiers
- Aliases: PPP1R9A, NRB1, NRBI, Neurabin-I, protein phosphatase 1 regulatory subunit 9A
- External IDs: OMIM: 602468; MGI: 2442401; GeneCards: PPP1R9A
Available structures
PDB	Human UniProt search: PDBe RCSB
PDB	List of PDB id codes 1WF8

Gene location (Human)
Chr.	Chromosome 7 (human)
Band	7q21.3	Start	94,907,202 bp
Band	7q21.3	End	95,296,415 bp

Gene location (Mouse)
Chr.	Chromosome 6 (mouse)
Band	6 A1|6 1.86 cM	Start	4,902,917 bp
Band	6 A1|6 1.86 cM	End	5,165,661 bp
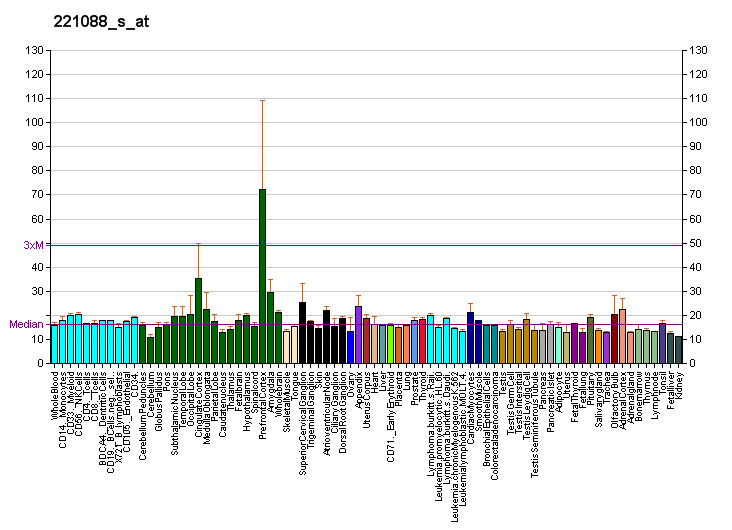

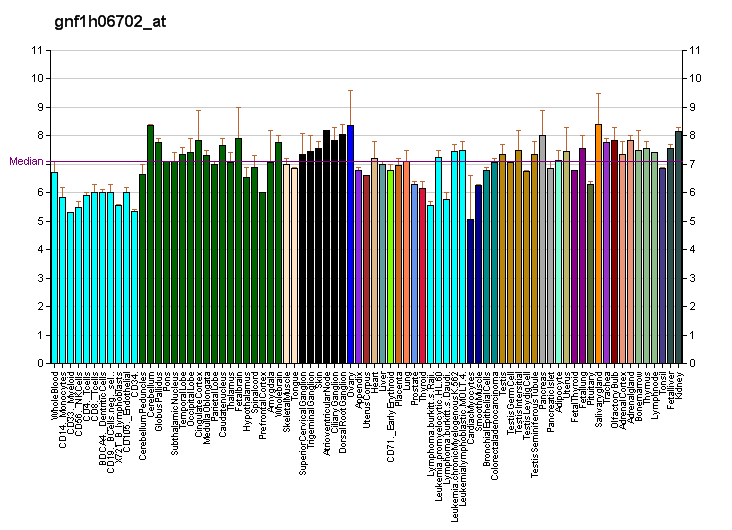
RNA expression pattern
Bgee	Human / Mouse (ortholog); Top expressed in: Brodmann area 23; endothelial cell; parietal lobe; postcentral gyrus; cerebellar vermis; entorhinal cortex; pons; external globus pallidus; middle temporal gyrus; optic nerve / Top expressed in: olfactory tubercle; lateral septal nucleus; nucleus accumbens; ventromedial nucleus; globus pallidus; primary motor cortex; arcuate nucleus; cingulate gyrus; anterior amygdaloid area; subiculum; More reference expression data
BioGPS	More reference expression data
Gene ontology
Molecular function	protein homodimerization activity; protein domain specific binding; protein phosphatase 1 binding; protein binding; GTPase binding; actin binding; actin filament binding; protein C-terminus binding; protein kinase binding; transmembrane transporter binding; protein-containing complex binding
Cellular component	dendritic spine neck; cytosol; filopodium; growth cone; neuromuscular junction; dendritic spine; synapse; growth cone lamellipodium; cell junction; soma; cortical actin cytoskeleton; neuron projection; cytoskeleton; lamellipodium; cytoplasm; postsynaptic density; actin cytoskeleton; dendrite; postsynaptic actin cytoskeleton; glutamatergic synapse
Biological process	regulation of filopodium assembly; cell differentiation; regulation of synapse structural plasticity; regulation of synapse assembly; ageing; cellular response to toxic substance; neuron development; positive regulation of dendritic spine development; nervous system development; multicellular organism development; regulation of actin filament polymerization; excitatory postsynaptic potential; negative regulation of long-term synaptic potentiation; negative regulation of spontaneous neurotransmitter secretion; positive regulation of long-term synaptic depression; positive regulation of neuron projection development; negative regulation of stress fiber assembly; regulation of dendritic spine morphogenesis; positive regulation of protein kinase activity; actin filament organization; calcium-mediated signaling; neuron projection development; modulation of chemical synaptic transmission; postsynaptic actin cytoskeleton organization
Sources:Amigo / QuickGO
Orthologs
Databases	NCBI: entry; OMA: entry
Species	Human	Mouse
Entrez	55607	243725
Ensembl	ENSG00000158528	ENSMUSG00000032827
UniProt	Q9ULJ8	n/a
RefSeq (mRNA)	NM_001166160; NM_001166161; NM_001166162; NM_001166163; NM_017650	NM_181595; NM_001363809
RefSeq (protein)	NP_001159632; NP_001159633; NP_001159634; NP_001159635; NP_060120 NP_001159635.1	n/a
Location (UCSC)	Chr 7: 94.91 – 95.3 Mb	Chr 6: 4.9 – 5.17 Mb
PubMed search
- Wikidata
View/Edit Human	View/Edit Mouse

Neurabin-1 is a protein that in humans is encoded by the PPP1R9A gene.
