= Microtubule associated serine/threonine kinase 3 =

Protein-coding gene in the species Homo sapiens

MAST3

Identifiers
- Aliases: MAST3, microtubule associated serine/threonine kinase 3
- External IDs: OMIM: 612258; MGI: 2683541; GeneCards: MAST3
Available structures
| PDB | Ortholog search: PDBe RCSB |
| PDB | List of PDB id codes 1V9V, 3KHF |
Enzyme activity
| EC # | BRENDA | ExPASy | KEGG | MetaCyc |
|---|---|---|---|---|
| 2.7.11.1 | ↗ | ↗ | ↗ | ↗ |

Gene location (Human)
| Chr. | Chromosome 19 (human) |
| Band | 19p13.11 | Start | 18,097,793 bp |
| Band | 19p13.11 | End | 18,151,692 bp |

Gene location (Mouse)
| Chr. | Chromosome 8 (mouse) |
| Band | 8|8 B3.3 | Start | 71,230,761 bp |
| Band | 8|8 B3.3 | End | 71,257,698 bp |
RNA expression pattern
| Bgee | Human / Mouse (ortholog); Top expressed in: frontal pole; Brodmann area 10; middle frontal gyrus; middle temporal gyrus; Brodmann area 46; orbitofrontal cortex; entorhinal cortex; Region I of hippocampus proper; superior frontal gyrus; parietal lobe / Top expressed in: primary visual cortex; superior frontal gyrus; striatum of neuraxis; hippocampus proper; dentate gyrus of hippocampal formation granule cell; granulocyte; thymus; spleen; olfactory bulb; islet of Langerhans; More reference expression data |
| BioGPS | n/a |
Gene ontology
| Molecular function | transferase activity; nucleotide binding; protein kinase activity; protein serine/threonine kinase activity; protein binding; ATP binding; magnesium ion binding; kinase activity |
| Cellular component | intracellular anatomical structure |
| Biological process | protein phosphorylation; intracellular signal transduction; peptidyl-serine phosphorylation; cytoskeleton organization; phosphorylation |
Sources:Amigo / QuickGO
Orthologs
| Databases | NCBI: entry; OMA: entry |
| Species | Human | Mouse |
| Entrez | 23031 | 546071 |
| Ensembl | ENSG00000099308 | ENSMUSG00000031833 |
| UniProt | O60307 | Q3U214 |
| RefSeq (mRNA) | NM_015016 | NM_199308 |
| RefSeq (protein) | NP_055831 | NP_955012; NP_001389902; NP_001389903; NP_001389904; NP_001389905 NP_001389907; NP_001389908; NP_001389909 |
| Location (UCSC) | Chr 19: 18.1 – 18.15 Mb | Chr 8: 71.23 – 71.26 Mb |
| PubMed search |
- Wikidata
| View/Edit Human | View/Edit Mouse |

Microtubule associated serine/threonine kinase 3 is a protein that in humans is encoded by the MAST3 gene.
