= Whirlin =

Protein found in humans

WHRN
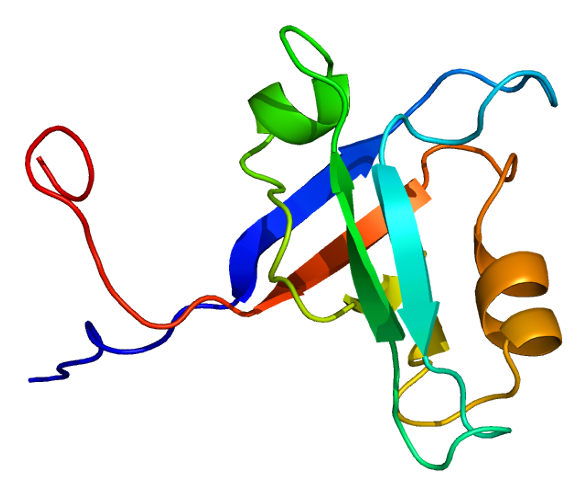

Identifiers
- Aliases: WHRN, CIP98, PDZD7B, USH2D, WI, DFNB31, whirlin, Whirin
- External IDs: OMIM: 607928; MGI: 2682003; GeneCards: WHRN
Available structures
| PDB | Ortholog search: PDBe RCSB |
| PDB | List of PDB id codes 1UEZ, 1UF1, 1UFX |

Gene location (Human)
| Chr. | Chromosome 9 (human) |
| Band | 9q32 | Start | 114,402,080 bp |
| Band | 9q32 | End | 114,505,473 bp |

Gene location (Mouse)
| Chr. | Chromosome 4 (mouse) |
| Band | 4 B3|4 33.97 cM | Start | 63,333,147 bp |
| Band | 4 B3|4 33.97 cM | End | 63,414,228 bp |
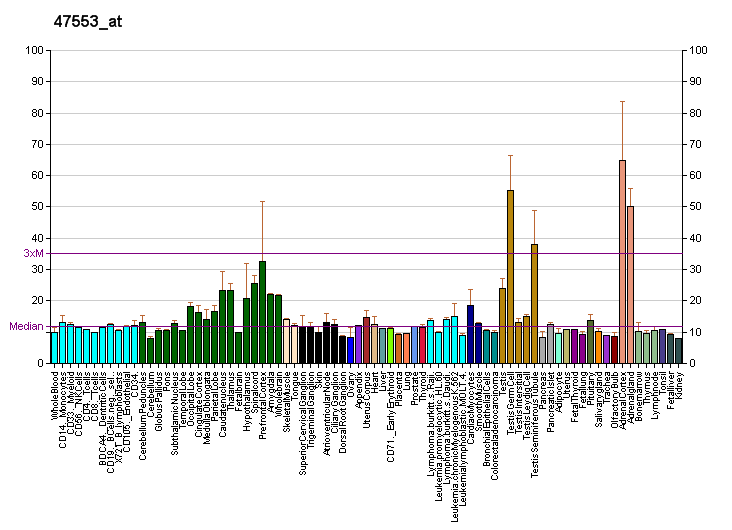

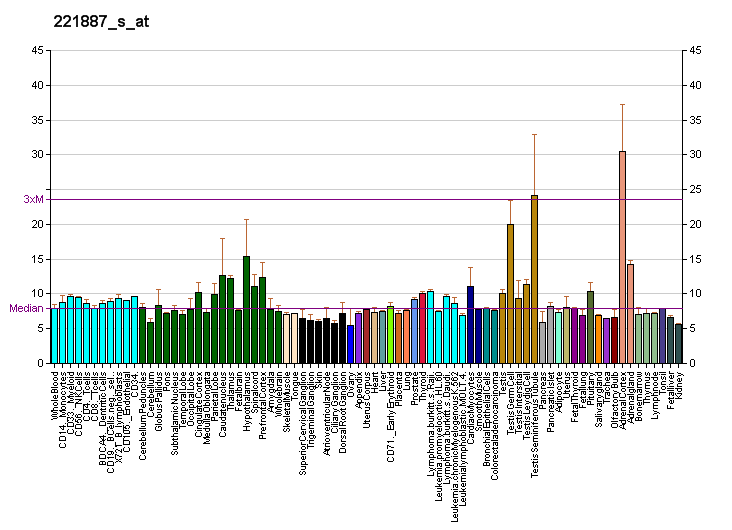
RNA expression pattern
| Bgee | Human / Mouse (ortholog); Top expressed in: right adrenal cortex; left adrenal gland; left adrenal cortex; left testis; right testis; pituitary gland; right uterine tube; anterior pituitary; C1 segment; body of uterus / Top expressed in: neural layer of retina; lumbar subsegment of spinal cord; interventricular septum; visual cortex; primary visual cortex; tail of embryo; thymus; superior frontal gyrus; cerebellar cortex; Rostral migratory stream; More reference expression data |
| BioGPS | More reference expression data |
Gene ontology
| Molecular function | protein binding; protein homodimerization activity; protein heterodimerization activity |
| Cellular component | cytoplasm; growth cone; cell projection; stereocilium; photoreceptor inner segment; stereocilia ankle link; stereocilia ankle link complex; actin filament; cilium; photoreceptor connecting cilium; stereocilium bundle; stereocilium tip; ciliary basal body; periciliary membrane compartment; USH2 complex; plasma membrane; soma; cell junction; synapse |
| Biological process | retina homeostasis; sensory perception of light stimulus; hearing; inner ear receptor cell stereocilium organization; positive regulation of gene expression; cerebellar Purkinje cell layer formation; establishment of protein localization; auditory receptor cell stereocilium organization; paranodal junction maintenance; detection of mechanical stimulus involved in sensory perception of sound |
Sources:Amigo / QuickGO
Orthologs
| Databases | NCBI: entry; OMA: entry |
| Species | Human | Mouse |
| Entrez | 25861 | 73750 |
| Ensembl | ENSG00000095397 | ENSMUSG00000039137 |
| UniProt | Q9P202 | Q80VW5 |
| RefSeq (mRNA) | NM_001083885; NM_001173425; NM_015404; NM_001346890 | NM_001008791; NM_001008792; NM_001008793; NM_001008794; NM_001008795 NM_001008796; NM_001008797; NM_001008798; NM_001276371; NM_028640 |
| RefSeq (protein) | NP_001077354; NP_001166896; NP_001333819; NP_056219 | NP_001008791; NP_001008792; NP_001008793; NP_001263300; NP_082916 |
| Location (UCSC) | Chr 9: 114.4 – 114.51 Mb | Chr 4: 63.33 – 63.41 Mb |
| PubMed search |
- Wikidata
| View/Edit Human | View/Edit Mouse |

Whirlin is a protein that in humans is encoded by the WHRN gene (previously DFNB31).

In rat brain, WHRN interacts with a calmodulin-dependent serine kinase, CASK, and may be involved in the formation of scaffolding protein complexes that facilitate synaptic transmission in the central nervous system (CNS). Mutations in this gene, also known as WHRN, cause autosomal recessive deafness.
