= SIPA1 =

Protein-coding gene in the species Homo sapiens

Identifiers
- Aliases: SIPA1, SPA1, signal-induced proliferation-associated 1
- External IDs: OMIM: 602180; MGI: 107576; GeneCards: SIPA1

Gene location (Human)
Chr.	Chromosome 11 (human)
Band	11q13.1	Start	65,638,101 bp
Band	11q13.1	End	65,650,918 bp

Gene location (Mouse)
Chr.	Chromosome 19 (mouse)
Band	19 A|19 4.34 cM	Start	5,701,213 bp
Band	19 A|19 4.34 cM	End	5,713,735 bp
RNA expression pattern
Bgee	Human / Mouse (ortholog); Top expressed in: granulocyte; spleen; apex of heart; upper lobe of left lung; sural nerve; right lung; monocyte; blood; right lobe of liver; left uterine tube / Top expressed in: granulocyte; mesenteric lymph nodes; yolk sac; spleen; thymus; blood; internal carotid artery; external carotid artery; tibiofemoral joint; left lung; More reference expression data
BioGPS	n/a
Gene ontology
Molecular function	protein binding; GTPase activator activity; protein C-terminus binding
Cellular component	cytoplasm; perinuclear region of cytoplasm; cytosol; transport vesicle; membrane; endomembrane system; nucleus; protein-containing complex
Biological process	negative regulation of cell adhesion; negative regulation of cell cycle; cellular response to water deprivation; cell population proliferation; intracellular signal transduction; regulation of small GTPase mediated signal transduction; cytoskeleton organization; negative regulation of cell growth; signal transduction; positive regulation of GTPase activity
Sources:Amigo / QuickGO
Orthologs
Databases	NCBI: entry; OMA: entry
Species	Human	Mouse
Entrez	6494	20469
Ensembl	ENSG00000213445	ENSMUSG00000056917
UniProt	Q96FS4	P46062
RefSeq (mRNA)	NM_006747; NM_153253	NM_001164480; NM_001164481; NM_001164482; NM_001164568; NM_011379
RefSeq (protein)	NP_006738; NP_694985	n/a
Location (UCSC)	Chr 11: 65.64 – 65.65 Mb	Chr 19: 5.7 – 5.71 Mb
PubMed search
- Wikidata
View/Edit Human	View/Edit Mouse

Signal-induced proliferation-associated protein 1 is a protein that in humans is encoded by the SIPA1 gene.

The product of this gene is a mitogen induced GTPase activating protein (GAP). It exhibits a specific GAP activity for Ras-related regulatory proteins Rap1 and Rap2, but not for Ran or other small GTPases. This protein may also hamper mitogen-induced cell cycle progression when abnormally or prematurely expressed. It is localized to the perinuclear region. Two alternatively spliced variants encoding the same isoform have been characterized to date.
