= PDLIM4 =

Protein-coding gene in the species Homo sapiens

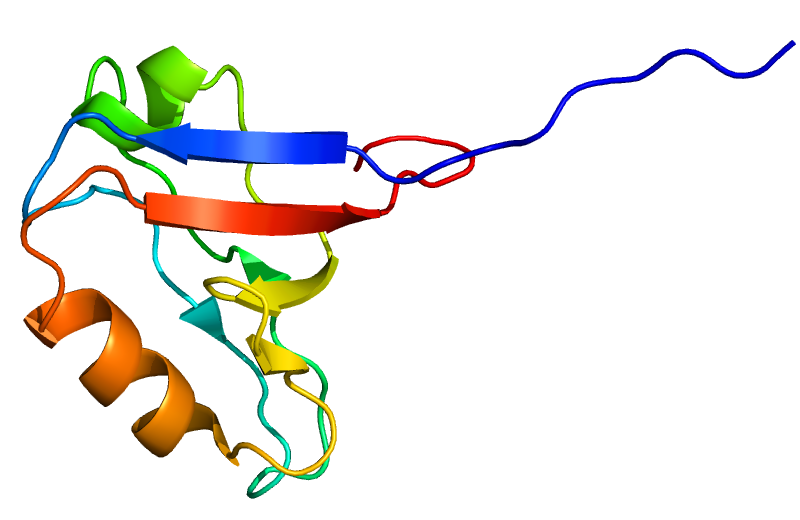

Identifiers
- Aliases: PDLIM4, RIL, PDZ and LIM domain 4
- External IDs: OMIM: 603422; MGI: 1353470; GeneCards: PDLIM4
Available structures
PDB	Ortholog search: PDBe RCSB
PDB	List of PDB id codes 2EEG, 2V1W, 4Q2O

Gene location (Human)
Chr.	Chromosome 5 (human)
Band	5q31.1	Start	132,257,696 bp
Band	5q31.1	End	132,273,454 bp

Gene location (Mouse)
Chr.	Chromosome 11 (mouse)
Band	11 B1.3|11 32.13 cM	Start	53,945,754 bp
Band	11 B1.3|11 32.13 cM	End	53,959,840 bp
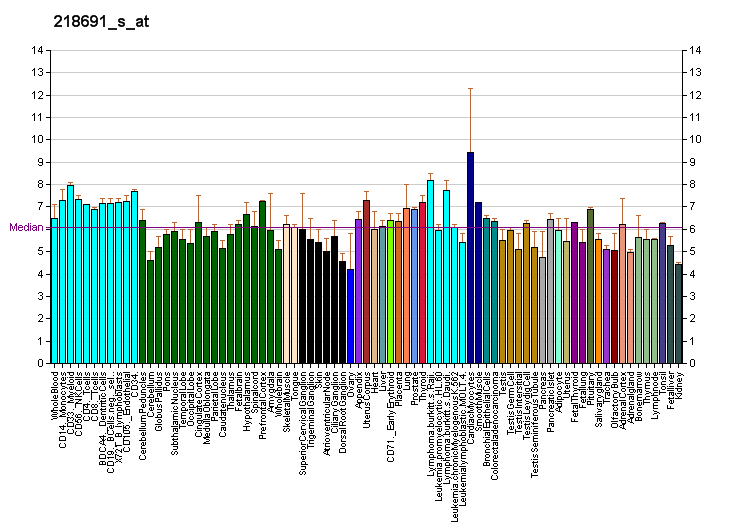

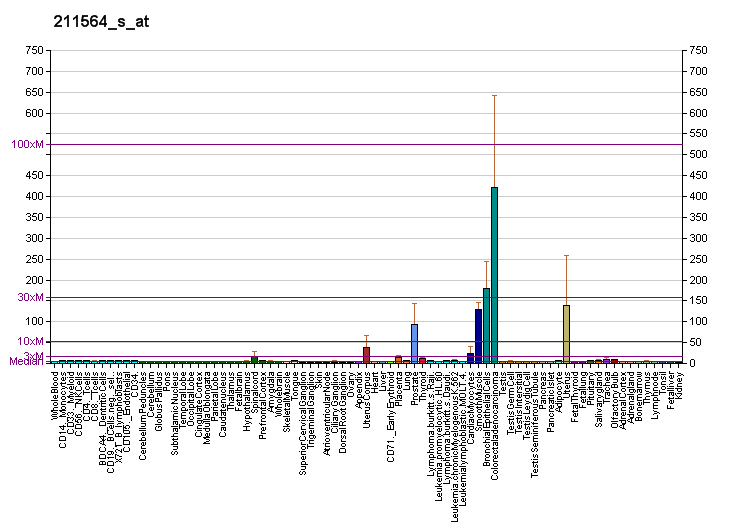

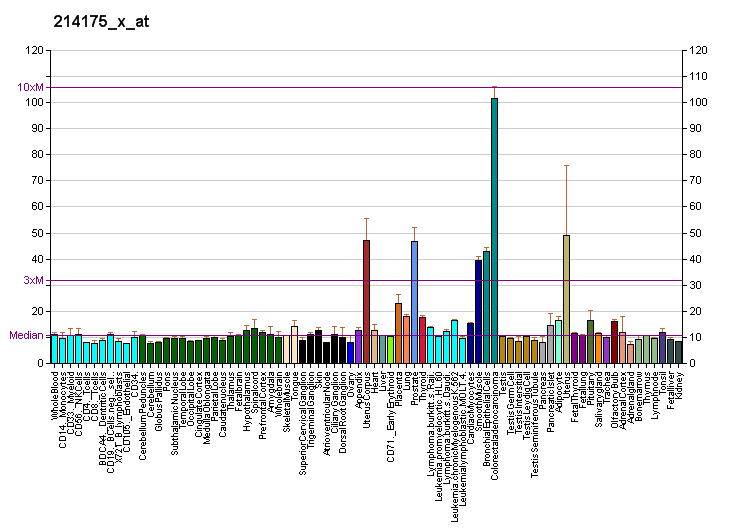
RNA expression pattern
Bgee	Human / Mouse (ortholog); Top expressed in: left uterine tube; body of uterus; tibial nerve; muscle layer of sigmoid colon; cartilage tissue; skin of leg; gastric mucosa; skin of abdomen; ascending aorta; Descending thoracic aorta / Top expressed in: lip; body wall; condyle; uterus; epithelium of stomach; stroma of bone marrow; calvaria; ankle joint; molar; cervix; More reference expression data
BioGPS	More reference expression data
Gene ontology
Molecular function	metal ion binding; protein binding; protein phosphatase binding; protein homodimerization activity; alpha-actinin binding; actin binding; muscle alpha-actinin binding
Cellular component	stress fiber; early endosome lumen; filamentous actin; recycling endosome lumen; postsynaptic membrane; nucleus; cytoplasm; endosome; cytoskeleton; membrane; lamellipodium; cell junction; early endosome membrane; cell projection; neuron projection; dendritic spine; synapse; perinuclear region of cytoplasm; recycling endosome membrane; Z discdkac
Biological process	actin cytoskeleton reorganization; excitatory chemical synaptic transmission; development of the heart; actin cytoskeleton organization; muscle structure development
Sources:Amigo / QuickGO
Orthologs
Databases	NCBI: entry; OMA: entry
Species	Human	Mouse
Entrez	8572	30794
Ensembl	ENSG00000131435	ENSMUSG00000020388
UniProt	P50479	P70271
RefSeq (mRNA)	NM_003687; NM_001131027	NM_019417
RefSeq (protein)	NP_001124499; NP_003678	NP_062290
Location (UCSC)	Chr 5: 132.26 – 132.27 Mb	Chr 11: 53.95 – 53.96 Mb
PubMed search
- Wikidata
View/Edit Human	View/Edit Mouse

PDZ and LIM domain protein 4 is a protein that in humans is encoded by the PDLIM4 gene.
