= Syntenin-2 =

Protein found in humans

SDCBP2

Identifiers
- Aliases: SDCBP2, SITAC, SITAC18, ST-2, syndecan binding protein 2, ST2
- External IDs: OMIM: 617358; MGI: 2385156; GeneCards: SDCBP2

Gene location (Human)
| Chr. | Chromosome 20 (human) |
| Band | 20p13 | Start | 1,309,909 bp |
| Band | 20p13 | End | 1,329,139 bp |

Gene location (Mouse)
| Chr. | Chromosome 2 (mouse) |
| Band | 2|2 G3 | Start | 151,414,542 bp |
| Band | 2|2 G3 | End | 151,431,925 bp |
RNA expression pattern
| Bgee | Human / Mouse (ortholog); Top expressed in: mucosa of ileum; mucosa of transverse colon; jejunal mucosa; mucosa of sigmoid colon; pancreatic ductal cell; rectum; nasal epithelium; gallbladder; skin of leg; duodenum / Top expressed in: mucous cell of stomach; pyloric antrum; epithelium of stomach; duodenum; intestinal villus; esophagus; jejunum; left colon; lip; ileum; More reference expression data |
| BioGPS | n/a |
Gene ontology
| Molecular function | protein C-terminus binding; protein binding; protein homodimerization activity; protein heterodimerization activity; identical protein binding; phosphatidylinositol-4,5-bisphosphate binding; lipid binding |
| Cellular component | extracellular exosome; nucleus; nucleoplasm; nucleolus; cytoplasm; plasma membrane; membrane; nuclear speck |
| Biological process | intracellular signal transduction; intracellular transport; nervous system development; cell population proliferation |
Sources:Amigo / QuickGO
Orthologs
| Databases | NCBI: entry; OMA: entry |
| Species | Human | Mouse |
| Entrez | 27111 | 228765 |
| Ensembl | ENSG00000125775 | ENSMUSG00000027456 |
| UniProt | Q9H190 | Q99JZ0 |
| RefSeq (mRNA) | NM_080489; NM_001199784; NM_015685 | NM_145535 |
| RefSeq (protein) | NP_001186713; NP_056500; NP_536737 | NP_663510 |
| Location (UCSC) | Chr 20: 1.31 – 1.33 Mb | Chr 2: 151.41 – 151.43 Mb |
| PubMed search |
- Wikidata
| View/Edit Human | View/Edit Mouse |

Syntenin-2 is a protein that in humans is encoded by the SDCBP2 gene.
