= PDZRN3 =

Protein-coding gene in the species Homo sapiens

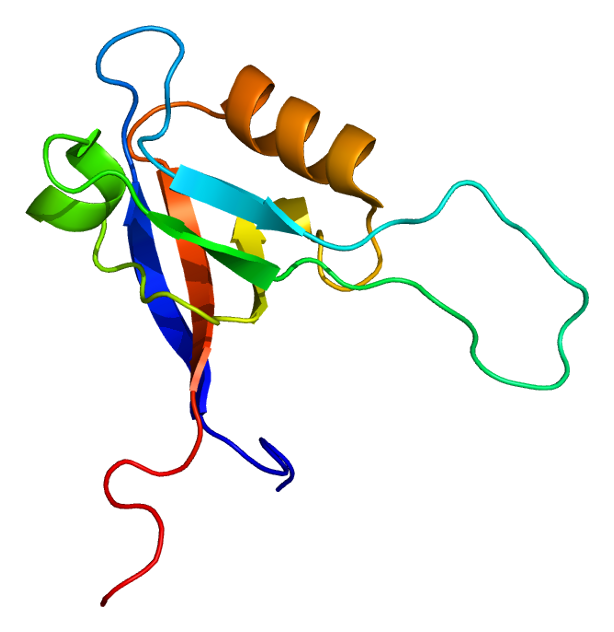

Identifiers
- Aliases: PDZRN3, LNX3, SEMACAP3, SEMCAP3, PDZ domain containing ring finger 3
- External IDs: OMIM: 609729; MGI: 1933157; GeneCards: PDZRN3
Available structures
PDB	Ortholog search: PDBe RCSB
PDB	List of PDB id codes 1UHP, 1WH1
Enzyme activity
EC #	BRENDA	ExPASy	KEGG	MetaCyc
2.3.2.27	↗	↗	↗	↗

Gene location (Human)
Chr.	Chromosome 3 (human)
Band	3p13	Start	73,382,431 bp
Band	3p13	End	73,624,941 bp

Gene location (Mouse)
Chr.	Chromosome 6 (mouse)
Band	6|6 D3	Start	101,126,570 bp
Band	6|6 D3	End	101,354,858 bp
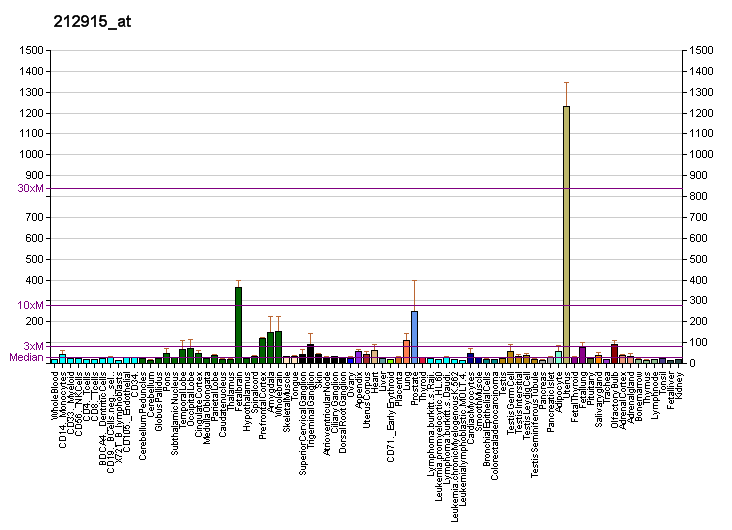
RNA expression pattern
Bgee	Human / Mouse (ortholog); Top expressed in: hair follicle; gastric mucosa; urethra; vastus lateralis muscle; seminal vesicula; cartilage tissue; saphenous vein; myocardium of left ventricle; right ventricle; tibia / Top expressed in: molar; soleus muscle; tibialis anterior muscle; vastus lateralis muscle; gastrocnemius muscle; umbilical cord; atrioventricular valve; medial head of gastrocnemius muscle; triceps brachii muscle; sternocleidomastoid muscle; More reference expression data
BioGPS	More reference expression data
Gene ontology
Molecular function	zinc ion binding; metal ion binding; ubiquitin protein ligase activity; ubiquitin-protein transferase activity; transferase activity
Cellular component	neuromuscular junction; nucleus; nucleoplasm; cytosol; cytoplasm; cell junction; synapse
Biological process	neuromuscular junction development; protein ubiquitination
Sources:Amigo / QuickGO
Orthologs
Databases	NCBI: entry; OMA: entry
Species	Human	Mouse
Entrez	23024	55983
Ensembl	ENSG00000121440	ENSMUSG00000035357
UniProt	Q9UPQ7	Q69ZS0
RefSeq (mRNA)	NM_015009; NM_001303139; NM_001303140; NM_001303141; NM_001303142	NM_018884
RefSeq (protein)	NP_001290068; NP_001290069; NP_001290070; NP_001290071; NP_055824	NP_061372
Location (UCSC)	Chr 3: 73.38 – 73.62 Mb	Chr 6: 101.13 – 101.35 Mb
PubMed search
- Wikidata
View/Edit Human	View/Edit Mouse

PDZ domain-containing RING finger protein 3 is a protein that in humans is encoded by the PDZRN3 gene.
