= PDZD11 =

Protein-coding gene in the species Homo sapiens

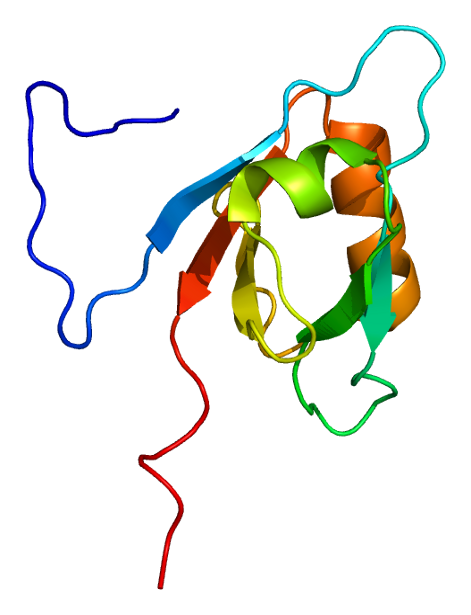

Identifiers
- Aliases: PDZD11, AIPP1, PDZK11, PISP, PDZ domain containing 11
- External IDs: OMIM: 300632; MGI: 1919871; GeneCards: PDZD11
Available structures
| PDB | Ortholog search: PDBe RCSB |
| PDB | List of PDB id codes 1WI2 |

Gene location (Human)
| Chr. | X chromosome (human) |
| Band | Xq13.1 | Start | 70,286,595 bp |
| Band | Xq13.1 | End | 70,290,514 bp |

Gene location (Mouse)
| Chr. | X chromosome (mouse) |
| Band | X|X C3 | Start | 99,666,489 bp |
| Band | X|X C3 | End | 99,670,174 bp |
RNA expression pattern
| Bgee | Human / Mouse (ortholog); Top expressed in: mucosa of ileum; myocardium of left ventricle; parotid gland; lateral nuclear group of thalamus; hypothalamus; prefrontal cortex; cardiac muscle tissue of right atrium; nasal epithelium; substantia nigra; amygdala / Top expressed in: right kidney; ventricular zone; yolk sac; morula; choroid plexus of fourth ventricle; medial ganglionic eminence; blastocyst; embryo; seminal vesicula; embryo; More reference expression data |
| BioGPS | n/a |
Gene ontology
| Molecular function | protein C-terminus binding; protein binding |
| Cellular component | cytoplasm; extracellular region; cytosol; synapse; cell-cell junction; presynapse; basolateral plasma membrane |
| Biological process | maintenance of epithelial cell apical/basal polarity; protein localization to basolateral plasma membrane; neurotransmitter secretion; biotin metabolic process; pantothenate metabolic process; antimicrobial humoral response; ion transmembrane transport; transmembrane transport |
Sources:Amigo / QuickGO
Orthologs
| Databases | NCBI: entry; OMA: entry |
| Species | Human | Mouse |
| Entrez | 51248 | 72621 |
| Ensembl | ENSG00000120509 | ENSMUSG00000015668 |
| UniProt | Q5EBL8 | Q9CZG9 |
| RefSeq (mRNA) | NM_016484 | NM_028303; NM_001356384 |
| RefSeq (protein) | NP_057568; NP_001357103; NP_001357104; NP_001357105; NP_001357106 NP_001357107 | NP_082579; NP_001343313 |
| Location (UCSC) | Chr X: 70.29 – 70.29 Mb | Chr X: 99.67 – 99.67 Mb |
| PubMed search |
- Wikidata
| View/Edit Human | View/Edit Mouse |

PDZ domain-containing protein 11 is a protein that in humans is encoded by the PDZD11 gene.
