= PSCDBP =

Protein-coding gene in the species Homo sapiens

CYTIP

Identifiers
- Aliases: CYTIP, B3-1, CASP, CYBR, CYTHIP, HE, PSCDBP, cytohesin 1 interacting protein
- External IDs: OMIM: 604448; MGI: 2183535; GeneCards: CYTIP
Available structures
PDB	Ortholog search: PDBe RCSB
PDB	List of PDB id codes 2Z17

Gene location (Human)
Chr.	Chromosome 2 (human)
Band	2q24.1	Start	157,414,619 bp
Band	2q24.1	End	157,488,961 bp

Gene location (Mouse)
Chr.	Chromosome 2 (mouse)
Band	2|2 C1.1	Start	58,019,149 bp
Band	2|2 C1.1	End	58,085,544 bp
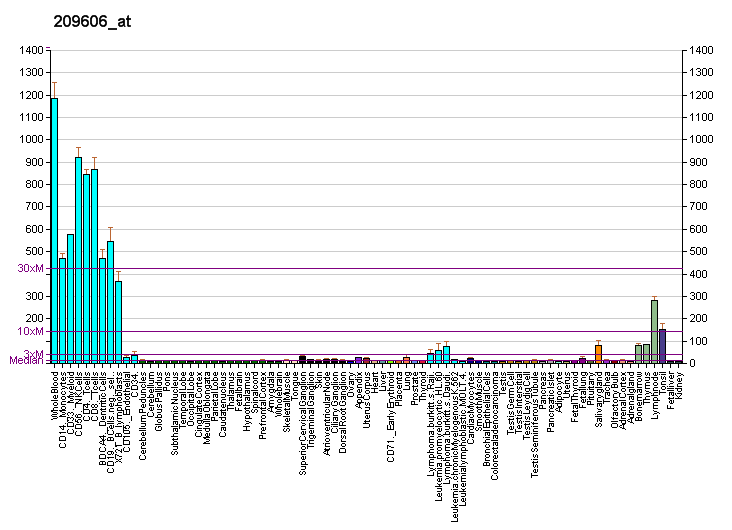
RNA expression pattern
Bgee	Human / Mouse (ortholog); Top expressed in: blood; bone marrow cell; white blood cell; monocyte; appendix; lymph node; granulocyte; epithelium of colon; epithelium of nasopharynx; spleen / Top expressed in: granulocyte; spleen; mesenteric lymph nodes; right lung lobe; thymus; blood; tibiofemoral joint; lactiferous gland; bone marrow; Paneth cell; More reference expression data
BioGPS	More reference expression data
Gene ontology
Molecular function	protein binding
Cellular component	cytoplasm; endosome; cell cortex; early endosome; nucleoplasm; cytosol
Biological process	regulation of cell adhesion
Sources:Amigo / QuickGO
Orthologs
Databases	NCBI: entry; OMA: entry
Species	Human	Mouse
Entrez	9595	227929
Ensembl	ENSG00000115165	ENSMUSG00000026832
UniProt	O60759	Q91VY6
RefSeq (mRNA)	NM_004288	NM_139200
RefSeq (protein)	NP_004279	NP_631939
Location (UCSC)	Chr 2: 157.41 – 157.49 Mb	Chr 2: 58.02 – 58.09 Mb
PubMed search
- Wikidata
View/Edit Human	View/Edit Mouse

Cytohesin-interacting protein is a protein that in humans is encoded by the CYTIP gene.

The protein encoded by this gene contains 2 leucine zipper domains and a putative C-terminal nuclear targeting signal, and it does not have any hydrophobic regions. This protein is expressed weakly in resting NK and T cells.
