= FRMPD4 =

Protein-coding gene in humans

Identifiers
- Aliases: FRMPD4, PDZD10, PDZK10, FERM and PDZ domain containing 4, MRX104
- External IDs: OMIM: 300838; MGI: 3042378; GeneCards: FRMPD4
Available structures
PDB	Ortholog search: PDBe RCSB
PDB	List of PDB id codes 4WND, 4WNE, 4WNF, 4WNG

Gene location (Human)
Chr.	X chromosome (human)
Band	Xp22.2	Start	12,138,466 bp
Band	Xp22.2	End	12,724,523 bp

Gene location (Mouse)
Chr.	X chromosome (mouse)
Band	X|X F5	Start	166,254,305 bp
Band	X|X F5	End	167,360,227 bp
RNA expression pattern
Bgee	Human / Mouse (ortholog); Top expressed in: middle temporal gyrus; endothelial cell; Brodmann area 23; Brodmann area 46; orbitofrontal cortex; superior frontal gyrus; postcentral gyrus; primary visual cortex; entorhinal cortex; prefrontal cortex / Top expressed in: dentate gyrus of hippocampal formation granule cell; hippocampus proper; primary visual cortex; superior frontal gyrus; cerebellum; cerebellar cortex; striatum of neuraxis; vasculature; vasculature of organ; olfactory bulb; More reference expression data
BioGPS	n/a
Gene ontology
Molecular function	phosphatidylinositol-4,5-bisphosphate binding; protein binding; lipid binding
Cellular component	dendritic spine; cell projection; cytoskeleton; protein-containing complex; postsynaptic density; glutamatergic synapse
Biological process	positive regulation of synapse structural plasticity; postsynaptic actin cytoskeleton organization
Sources:Amigo / QuickGO
Orthologs
Databases	NCBI: entry; OMA: entry
Species	Human	Mouse
Entrez	9758	333605
Ensembl	ENSG00000169933	ENSMUSG00000049176
UniProt	Q14CM0	A2AFR3
RefSeq (mRNA)	NM_014728	NM_001033330; NM_001290427; NM_001290428; NM_001359072; NM_001368936 NM_001369234
RefSeq (protein)	NP_055543; NP_001355324; NP_001355325; NP_001355326; NP_001355327 NP_001355328; NP_001355329; NP_001355330; NP_001355331	NP_001028502; NP_001277356; NP_001277357; NP_001346001; NP_001355865 NP_001356163
Location (UCSC)	Chr X: 12.14 – 12.72 Mb	Chr X: 166.25 – 167.36 Mb
PubMed search
- Wikidata
View/Edit Human	View/Edit Mouse

FERM and PDZ domain containing 4 is a protein that in humans is encoded by the FRMPD4 gene.

== Function ==
This gene encodes a multi-domain (WW, PDZ, FERM) containing protein. Through its interaction with other proteins (such as PSD-95), it functions as a positive regulator of dendritic spine morphogenesis and density, and is required for the maintenance of excitatory synaptic transmission.
