= SIPA1L1 =

Protein-coding gene in the species Homo sapiens

Identifiers
- Aliases: SIPA1L1, E6TP1, signal induced proliferation associated 1 like 1, SPAR1
- External IDs: OMIM: 617504; MGI: 2443679; GeneCards: SIPA1L1

Gene location (Human)
Chr.	Chromosome 14 (human)
Band	14q24.2	Start	71,320,449 bp
Band	14q24.2	End	71,741,229 bp

Gene location (Mouse)
Chr.	Chromosome 12 (mouse)
Band	12|12 D1	Start	82,216,094 bp
Band	12|12 D1	End	82,498,560 bp
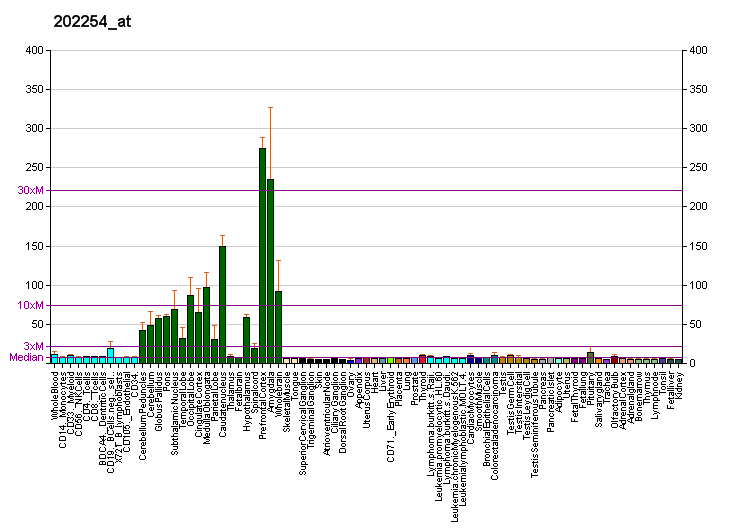

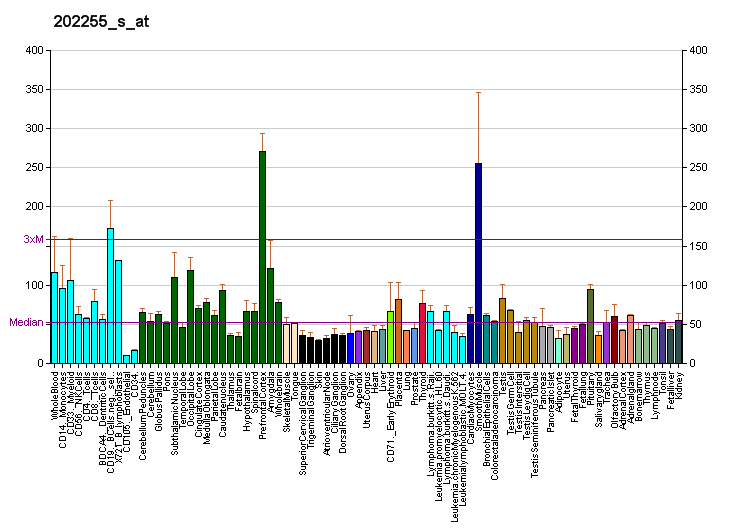
RNA expression pattern
Bgee	Human / Mouse (ortholog); Top expressed in: nucleus accumbens; testicle; external globus pallidus; caudate nucleus; Region I of hippocampus proper; right frontal lobe; right hemisphere of cerebellum; sural nerve; popliteal artery; tibial arteries / Top expressed in: olfactory tubercle; temporal lobe; nucleus accumbens; primary motor cortex; prefrontal cortex; amygdala; lateral septal nucleus; Region I of hippocampus proper; piriform cortex; vestibular membrane of cochlear duct; More reference expression data
BioGPS	More reference expression data
Gene ontology
Molecular function	GTPase activator activity; ephrin receptor binding; molecular function
Cellular component	cytoplasm; postsynaptic membrane; membrane; postsynaptic density; plasma membrane; dendritic spine; synapse; cell junction; neuron projection; cytoskeleton; cellular component
Biological process	actin cytoskeleton reorganization; activation of GTPase activity; regulation of GTPase activity; ephrin receptor signaling pathway; regulation of synaptic plasticity; regulation of dendrite morphogenesis; regulation of axonogenesis; regulation of small GTPase mediated signal transduction; regulation of dendritic spine morphogenesis; biological process
Sources:Amigo / QuickGO
Orthologs
Databases	NCBI: entry; OMA: entry
Species	Human	Mouse
Entrez	26037	217692
Ensembl	ENSG00000197555	ENSMUSG00000042700
UniProt	O43166	Q8C0T5
RefSeq (mRNA)	NM_001284245; NM_001284246; NM_001284247; NM_015556; NM_001354285 NM_001354286; NM_001354287; NM_001354288; NM_001354289; NM_001386936	NM_001167983; NM_172579
RefSeq (protein)	NP_001271174; NP_001271175; NP_001271176; NP_056371; NP_001341214 NP_001341215; NP_001341216; NP_001341217; NP_001341218	NP_001161455; NP_766167; NP_001394331; NP_001394332; NP_001394333 NP_001394334; NP_001394335; NP_001394336; NP_001394337; NP_001394338; NP_001394339; NP_001394340; NP_001394341; NP_001394342; NP_001394343; NP_001394344
Location (UCSC)	Chr 14: 71.32 – 71.74 Mb	Chr 12: 82.22 – 82.5 Mb
PubMed search
- Wikidata
View/Edit Human	View/Edit Mouse

Signal-induced proliferation-associated 1-like protein 1 is a protein that in humans is encoded by the SIPA1L1 gene.
