= PDZD4 =

Protein-coding gene in the species Homo sapiens

Identifiers
- Aliases: PDZD4, LU1, PDZK4, PDZRN4L, PDZ domain containing 4, LNX5
- External IDs: OMIM: 300634; MGI: 2443483; GeneCards: PDZD4

Gene location (Human)
Chr.	X chromosome (human)
Band	Xq28	Start	153,802,166 bp
Band	Xq28	End	153,830,565 bp

Gene location (Mouse)
Chr.	X chromosome (mouse)
Band	X|X A7.3	Start	72,836,965 bp
Band	X|X A7.3	End	72,868,575 bp
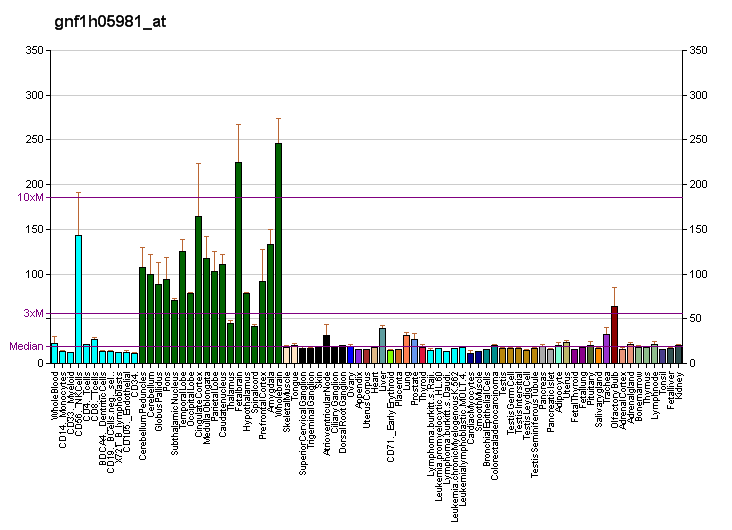
RNA expression pattern
Bgee	Human / Mouse (ortholog); Top expressed in: right hemisphere of cerebellum; right frontal lobe; cingulate gyrus; anterior cingulate cortex; Brodmann area 9; prefrontal cortex; amygdala; nucleus accumbens; caudate nucleus; putamen / Top expressed in: dentate gyrus of hippocampal formation granule cell; superior frontal gyrus; supraoptic nucleus; primary visual cortex; epiblast; ascending aorta; otic vesicle; ganglionic eminence; hippocampus proper; cerebellar cortex; More reference expression data
BioGPS	More reference expression data
Gene ontology
Molecular function	ubiquitin protein ligase activity; protein binding
Cellular component	cytoplasm; cell cortex
Biological process	protein ubiquitination
Sources:Amigo / QuickGO
Orthologs
Databases	NCBI: entry; OMA: entry
Species	Human	Mouse
Entrez	57595	245469
Ensembl	ENSG00000067840	ENSMUSG00000002006
UniProt	Q76G19; Q17RL8	Q9QY39
RefSeq (mRNA)	NM_032512; NM_001303512; NM_001303513; NM_001303514; NM_001303515 NM_001303516	NM_001029868; NM_001290540
RefSeq (protein)	NP_001290441; NP_001290442; NP_001290443; NP_001290444; NP_001290445 NP_115901; NP_001290441.1	NP_001025039; NP_001277469
Location (UCSC)	Chr X: 153.8 – 153.83 Mb	Chr X: 72.84 – 72.87 Mb
PubMed search
- Wikidata
View/Edit Human	View/Edit Mouse

PDZ domain-containing protein 4 is a protein that in humans is encoded by the PDZD4 gene.
