= SNTG2 =

Protein-coding gene in humans

Identifiers
- Aliases: SNTG2, G2SYN, SYN5, syntrophin gamma 2
- External IDs: OMIM: 608715; MGI: 1919541; GeneCards: SNTG2

Gene location (Human)
Chr.	Chromosome 2 (human)
Band	2p25.3	Start	950,849 bp
Band	2p25.3	End	1,367,613 bp

Gene location (Mouse)
Chr.	Chromosome 12 (mouse)
Band	12|12 A2	Start	30,224,481 bp
Band	12|12 A2	End	30,423,374 bp
RNA expression pattern
Bgee	Human / Mouse (ortholog); Top expressed in: sural nerve; testicle; right testis; left testis; Achilles tendon; gonad; body of pancreas; spleen; anterior pituitary; stromal cell of endometrium / Top expressed in: neural layer of retina; detrusor urinae muscle; urethra; zygote; male urethra; embryo; muscle layer of urethra; lumbar subsegment of spinal cord; tunica media of zone of aorta; migratory enteric neural crest cell; More reference expression data
BioGPS	n/a
Gene ontology
Molecular function	actin binding; PDZ domain binding; neuroligin family protein binding; structural molecule activity; protein binding
Cellular component	cytoplasm; sarcolemma; plasma membrane; syntrophin complex; cytoskeleton; membrane; intracellular anatomical structure; dystrophin-associated glycoprotein complex
Biological process	central nervous system development
Sources:Amigo / QuickGO
Orthologs
Databases	NCBI: entry; OMA: entry
Species	Human	Mouse
Entrez	54221	268534
Ensembl	ENSG00000281486; ENSG00000281020; ENSG00000172554	ENSMUSG00000020672
UniProt	Q9NY99	Q925E0
RefSeq (mRNA)	NM_018968	NM_172951; NM_001324519; NM_001324520; NM_001324521
RefSeq (protein)	NP_061841	NP_001311448; NP_001311449; NP_001311450; NP_766539
Location (UCSC)	Chr 2: 0.95 – 1.37 Mb	Chr 12: 30.22 – 30.42 Mb
PubMed search
- Wikidata
View/Edit Human	View/Edit Mouse

Gamma-2-syntrophin is a protein that in humans is encoded by the SNTG2 gene.
