= MPP1 =

Protein-coding gene in the species Homo sapiens

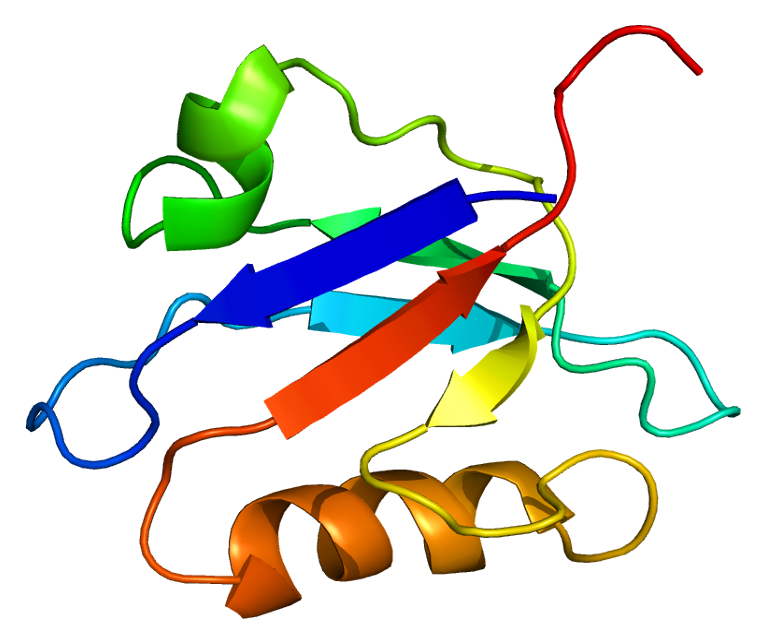

Identifiers
- Aliases: MPP1, AAG12, DXS552E, EMP55, MRG1, PEMP, membrane palmitoylated protein 1, MAGUK p55 scaffold protein 1
- External IDs: OMIM: 305360; MGI: 105941; GeneCards: MPP1
Available structures
PDB	Ortholog search: PDBe RCSB
PDB	List of PDB id codes 2EJY, 2EV8, 3NEY

Gene location (Human)
Chr.	X chromosome (human)
Band	Xq28	Start	154,778,684 bp
Band	Xq28	End	154,821,007 bp

Gene location (Mouse)
Chr.	X chromosome (mouse)
Band	X A7.3|X 38.15 cM	Start	74,153,339 bp
Band	X A7.3|X 38.15 cM	End	74,174,622 bp
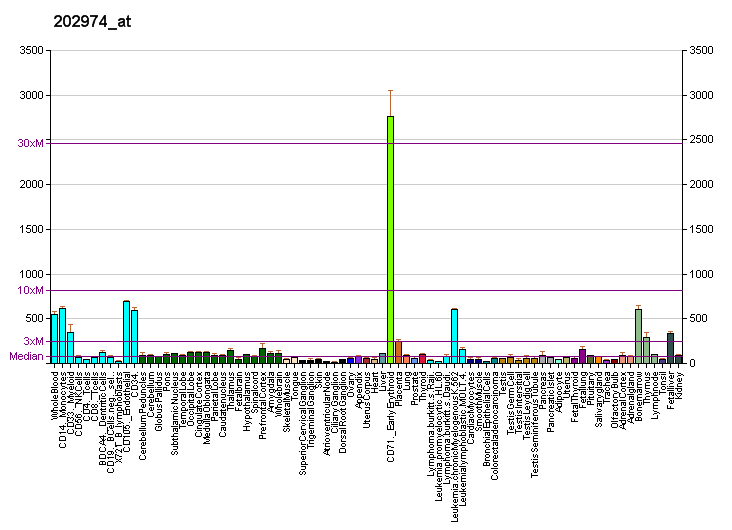
RNA expression pattern
Bgee	Human / Mouse (ortholog); Top expressed in: monocyte; blood; jejunal mucosa; trabecular bone; bone marrow; bone marrow cell; duodenum; right lung; spleen; granulocyte / Top expressed in: fetal liver hematopoietic progenitor cell; tibiofemoral joint; blood; jejunum; ileum; right kidney; stroma of bone marrow; granulocyte; endothelial cell of lymphatic vessel; white adipose tissue; More reference expression data
BioGPS	More reference expression data
Gene ontology
Molecular function	guanylate kinase activity; protein binding
Cellular component	cortical cytoskeleton; cell projection; integral component of plasma membrane; intracellular anatomical structure; membrane; stereocilium; cytosol; plasma membrane; nuclear speck
Biological process	regulation of neutrophil chemotaxis; signal transduction; GDP metabolic process; GMP metabolic process
Sources:Amigo / QuickGO
Orthologs
Databases	NCBI: entry; OMA: entry
Species	Human	Mouse
Entrez	4354	17524
Ensembl	ENSG00000130830	ENSMUSG00000031402
UniProt	Q00013	P70290
RefSeq (mRNA)	NM_001166460; NM_001166461; NM_001166462; NM_002436	NM_008621
RefSeq (protein)	NP_001159932; NP_001159933; NP_001159934; NP_002427	NP_032647
Location (UCSC)	Chr X: 154.78 – 154.82 Mb	Chr X: 74.15 – 74.17 Mb
PubMed search
- Wikidata
View/Edit Human	View/Edit Mouse

55 kDa erythrocyte membrane protein is a protein that in humans is encoded by the MPP1 gene.

Palmitoylated membrane protein 1 is the prototype of a family of membrane-associated proteins termed MAGUKs (membrane-associated guanylate kinase homologs). MAGUKs interact with the cytoskeleton and regulate cell proliferation, signaling pathways, and intracellular junctions. Palmitoylated membrane protein 1 contains a conserved sequence, called the SH3 (src homology 3) motif, found in several other proteins that associate with the cytoskeleton and are suspected to play important roles in signal transduction.
