= ARHGEF7 =

Protein-coding gene in humans

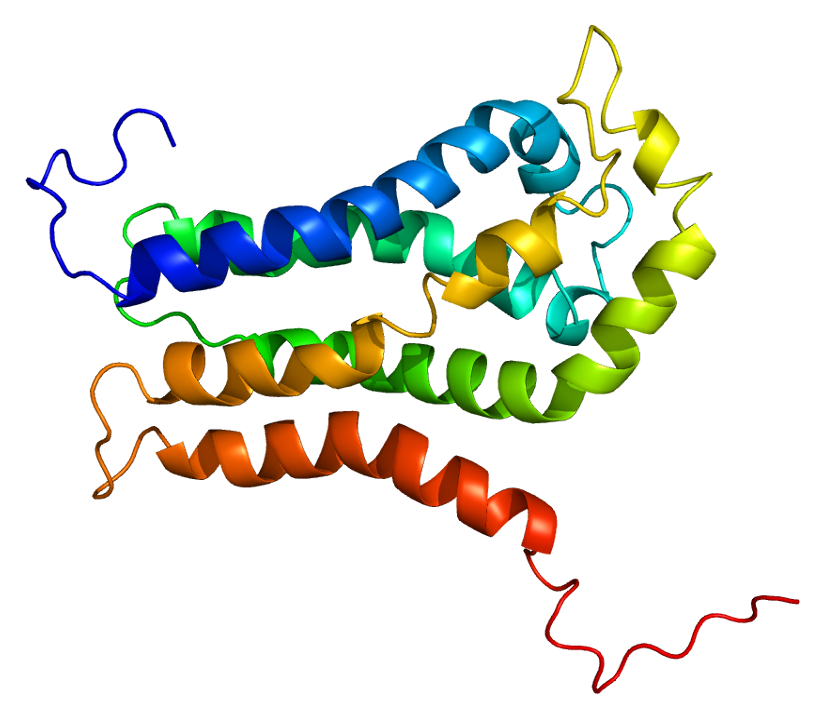

Identifiers
- Aliases: ARHGEF7, BETA-PIX, COOL-1, COOL1, Nbla10314, P50, P50BP, P85, P85COOL1, P85SPR, PAK3, PIXB, Rho guanine nucleotide exchange factor 7
- External IDs: OMIM: 605477; MGI: 1860493; GeneCards: ARHGEF7
Available structures
PDB	Ortholog search: PDBe RCSB
PDB	List of PDB id codes 1BY1, 1ZSG, 2L3G

Gene location (Human)
Chr.	Chromosome 13 (human)
Band	13q34	Start	111,114,559 bp
Band	13q34	End	111,305,737 bp

Gene location (Mouse)
Chr.	Chromosome 8 (mouse)
Band	8|8 A1.1	Start	11,727,721 bp
Band	8|8 A1.1	End	11,835,219 bp
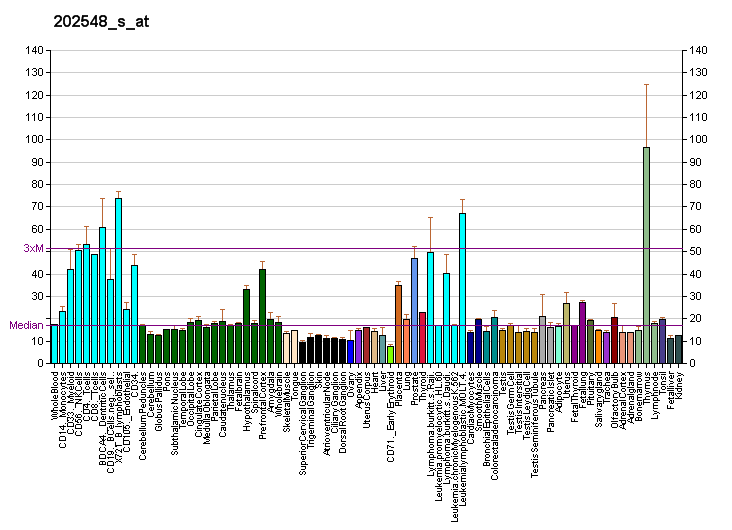

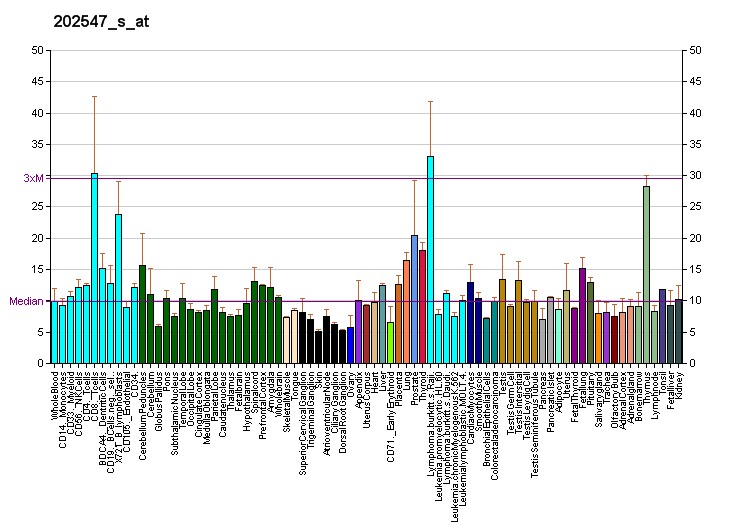
RNA expression pattern
Bgee	Human / Mouse (ortholog); Top expressed in: middle temporal gyrus; sural nerve; right hemisphere of cerebellum; tibial arteries; cerebellar vermis; skin of thigh; skin of hip; right coronary artery; subcutaneous adipose tissue; left coronary artery / Top expressed in: lobe of cerebellum; cerebellar vermis; genital tubercle; external carotid artery; internal carotid artery; barrel cortex; endocardial cushion; dentate gyrus of hippocampal formation granule cell; tail of embryo; ganglionic eminence; More reference expression data
BioGPS	More reference expression data
Gene ontology
Molecular function	protein binding; guanyl-nucleotide exchange factor activity; protein kinase binding
Cellular component	cytoplasm; cytosol; cell projection; focal adhesion; ruffle; plasma membrane; cell junction; soma; cell cortex; neuron projection; storage vacuole; lamellipodium; intracellular anatomical structure
Biological process	regulation of GTP binding; intracellular signal transduction; negative regulation of epidermal growth factor receptor signaling pathway; positive regulation of lamellipodium morphogenesis; Golgi organization; ephrin receptor signaling pathway; nervous system development; focal adhesion assembly; positive regulation of substrate adhesion-dependent cell spreading; positive regulation of growth hormone secretion; hematopoietic progenitor cell differentiation; positive regulation of apoptotic process; positive regulation of protein binding; regulation of Rho protein signal transduction; regulation of small GTPase mediated signal transduction; positive regulation of fibroblast migration; signal transduction; lamellipodium assembly; positive regulation of GTPase activity; G protein-coupled receptor signaling pathway
Sources:Amigo / QuickGO
Orthologs
Databases	NCBI: entry; OMA: entry
Species	Human	Mouse
Entrez	8874	54126
Ensembl	ENSG00000102606	ENSMUSG00000031511
UniProt	Q14155	Q9ES28
RefSeq (mRNA)	NM_001113511; NM_001113512; NM_001113513; NM_003899; NM_145735 NM_001320851; NM_001320852; NM_001320853; NM_001320854; NM_001330597; NM_001330598; NM_001354046; NM_001354047; NM_001354048; NM_001354049; NM_001354050; NM_001354051; NM_001354052; NM_001354053; NM_001354054; NM_001354055; NM_001354056; NM_001354057; NM_001354058; NM_001354059; NM_001354060; NM_001354061	NM_001113517; NM_001113518; NM_017402; NM_001372321; NM_001372322 NM_001372323; NM_001372324; NM_001372325; NM_001372326
RefSeq (protein)	NP_001106983; NP_001106984; NP_001106985; NP_001307780; NP_001307781 NP_001307782; NP_001307783; NP_001317526; NP_001317527; NP_003890; NP_663788; NP_001340975; NP_001340976; NP_001340977; NP_001340978; NP_001340979; NP_001340980; NP_001340981; NP_001340982; NP_001340983; NP_001340984; NP_001340985; NP_001340986; NP_001340987; NP_001340988; NP_001340989; NP_001340990; NP_001106985.1; NP_003890.1; NP_001307780.1	NP_001106989; NP_001106990; NP_059098; NP_001359250; NP_001359251 NP_001359252; NP_001359253; NP_001359254; NP_001359255
Location (UCSC)	Chr 13: 111.11 – 111.31 Mb	Chr 8: 11.73 – 11.84 Mb
PubMed search
- Wikidata
View/Edit Human	View/Edit Mouse

Rho guanine nucleotide exchange factor 7 is a protein that in humans is encoded by the ARHGEF7 gene.

ARHGEF7 is commonly known as the p21-activated protein kinase exchange factor beta (beta-PIX or βPIX), because it was identified by binding to p21-activated kinase (PAK) and also contains a guanine nucleotide exchange factor domain.

== Domains and functions ==
βPIX is a multidomain protein that functions both as a signaling scaffold protein and as an enzyme. βPIX shares this domain structure and signaling function with the highly similar ARHGEF6/αPIX protein.

βPIX undergoes extensive alternative splicing to generate multiple variant proteins containing or lacking particular protein domains. Adult forms all lack the amino terminal CH domain, and the two major adult variants have alternate carboxyl terminal region (termed β1 and β2): β1 forms contain the coiled-coil trimerization domain and the PDZ-target motif for binding to PDZ proteins (see below), while β2 forms lack both domains and their corresponding functions.

βPIX contains a central DH/PH RhoGEF domain that functions as a guanine nucleotide exchange factor (GEF) for small GTPases of the Rho family, and specifically Rac and Cdc42. Like other GEFs, βPIX can promote both release of GDP from an inactive small GTP-binding protein and binding of GTP to promote its activation. Signaling scaffolds bind to specific partners to promote efficient signal transduction by arranging sequential elements of a pathway near each other to facilitate interaction/information transfer, and also by holding these partner protein complexes in specific locations within the cell to promote local or regional signaling. In the case of βPIX, its SH3 domain binds to partner proteins with appropriate polyproline motifs, and particularly to group I p21-activated kinases (PAKs) (PAK1, PAK2 and PAK3). PAK is bound to the βPIX SH3 domain in the inactive state, and activated Rac1 or Cdc42 binding to this PAK stimulates its protein kinase activity leading to downstream target protein phosphorylation; since βPIX can activate the "p21" small GTPases Rac1 or Cdc42 through its GEF activity, this βPIX/PAK/Rac complex exemplifies a scaffolding function.

Structurally, βPIX assembles as a trimer through a carboxyl-terminal coiled-coil domain that is present in the major carboxyl terminal splice variant β1, and further interacts with dimers of GIT1 or GIT2 through a nearby GIT-binding domain to form oligomeric GIT-PIX complexes. Through this GIT-PIX complex, the scaffolding function of βPIX is amplified by also being able to hold GIT partners in proximity to βPIX partners. In contrast, β2 carboxyl terminal variants lack this coiled-coil region and are predicted to be unable to trimerize. The major carboxyl terminal variant β1 also has a PDZ domain binding target motif that binds to the PDZ domains in SHANK1, scribble, and SNX27 proteins. Some splice variants of βPIX contain an amino-terminal Calponin Homology (CH) domain whose functions remain relatively poorly defined, but may interacts with parvin/affixin family proteins. βPIX variants with this extended amino terminal CH domain are most highly expressed early in development, but appear rare after birth.

== Interactions ==
βPIX has been reported to interact with over 120 proteins.

Major interacting proteins include:

- Itself, or the highly-related ARHGEF6/αPIX via a trimeric coiled-coil interaction.
- GIT1 or GIT2 dimers via GIT-binding domain.
- p21-activated kinases (PAKs) 1, 2 and 3 via SH3 domain.
- c-Cbl via SH3 domain.
- Rho family GTP-binding protein family members Rac1 and Cdc42, activated via DHPH RhoGEF domain.
- The neuronal synapse adaptors SHANK1, SHANK2, and SHANK3 via PDZ
- Scribble via PDZ
- SNX27 via PDZ

== See also ==
- Rho family of GTPases
- Scaffold protein
- Guanine nucleotide exchange factor
