= ARHGEF6 =

Protein-coding gene in humans

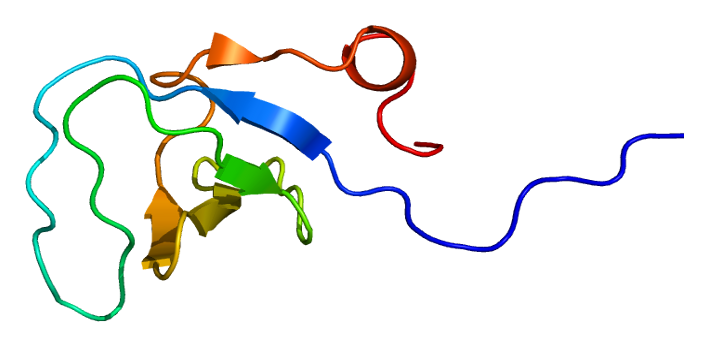

Identifiers
- Aliases: ARHGEF6, COOL2, Cool-2, MRX46, PIXA, alpha-PIX, alphaPIX, Rac/Cdc42 guanine nucleotide exchange factor 6
- External IDs: OMIM: 300267; MGI: 1920591; GeneCards: ARHGEF6
Available structures
PDB	Ortholog search: PDBe RCSB
PDB	List of PDB id codes 1UJY, 1WYR

Gene location (Human)
Chr.	X chromosome (human)
Band	Xq26.3	Start	136,665,547 bp
Band	Xq26.3	End	136,780,932 bp

Gene location (Mouse)
Chr.	X chromosome (mouse)
Band	X|X A6	Start	57,231,485 bp
Band	X|X A6	End	57,338,729 bp
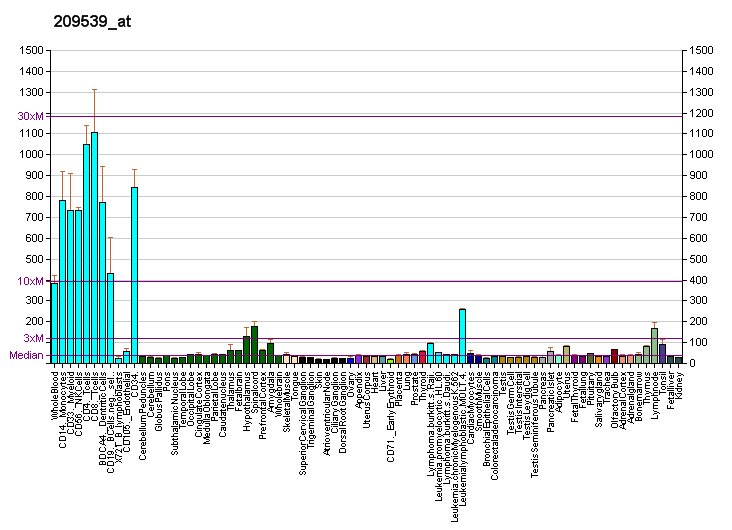
RNA expression pattern
Bgee	Human / Mouse (ortholog); Top expressed in: biceps brachii; Skeletal muscle tissue of biceps brachii; internal globus pallidus; vastus lateralis muscle; Skeletal muscle tissue of rectus abdominis; right ventricle; tibia; Achilles tendon; mononuclear cell; monocyte / Top expressed in: gastrula; interventricular septum; mesenteric lymph nodes; granulocyte; calvaria; triceps brachii muscle; muscle of thigh; thymus; vastus lateralis muscle; medial head of gastrocnemius muscle; More reference expression data
BioGPS	More reference expression data
Gene ontology
Molecular function	protein binding; GTPase activator activity; guanyl-nucleotide exchange factor activity
Cellular component	cytosol; cell projection; lamellipodium
Biological process	positive regulation of apoptotic process; JNK cascade; regulation of Rho protein signal transduction; regulation of small GTPase mediated signal transduction; lamellipodium assembly; apoptotic process; positive regulation of GTPase activity; G protein-coupled receptor signaling pathway
Sources:Amigo / QuickGO
Orthologs
Databases	NCBI: entry; OMA: entry
Species	Human	Mouse
Entrez	9459	73341
Ensembl	ENSG00000129675	ENSMUSG00000031133
UniProt	Q15052	Q8K4I3
RefSeq (mRNA)	NM_001306177; NM_004840	NM_152801; NM_001358573
RefSeq (protein)	NP_001293106; NP_004831	NP_690014; NP_001345502; NP_001392097; NP_001392098; NP_001392099 NP_001392100; NP_001392101; NP_001392102; NP_001392103; NP_001392104; NP_001392105
Location (UCSC)	Chr X: 136.67 – 136.78 Mb	Chr X: 57.23 – 57.34 Mb
PubMed search
- Wikidata
View/Edit Human	View/Edit Mouse

Rho guanine nucleotide exchange factor 6 is a protein that, in humans, is encoded by the ARHGEF6 gene.

ARHGEF6 is commonly known as the p21-activated protein kinase exchange factor alpha (alpha-PIX or αPIX), because it was identified by binding to p21-activated kinase (PAK) and also contains a guanine nucleotide exchange factor domain.

== Domains and functions ==
αPIX is a multidomain protein that functions both as a signaling scaffold protein and as an enzyme. αPIX shares this domain structure and signaling function with the highly similar ARHGEF7/βPIX protein. αPIX contains a central DH/PH RhoGEF domain that functions as a guanine nucleotide exchange factor (GEF) for small GTPases of the Rho family, and specifically Rac and Cdc42. Like other GEFs, αPIX can promote both release of GDP from an inactive small GTP-binding protein and binding of GTP to promote its activation. Signaling scaffolds bind to specific partners to promote efficient signal transduction by arranging sequential elements of a pathway near each other to facilitate interaction/information transfer, and also by holding these partner protein complexes in specific locations within the cell to promote local or regional signaling. In the case of αPIX, its SH3 domain binds to partner proteins with appropriate polyproline motifs, and particularly to group I p21-activated kinases (PAKs) (PAK1, PAK2 and PAK3). PAK is bound to the αPIX SH3 domain in the inactive state, and activated Rac1 or Cdc42 binding to this PAK stimulates its protein kinase activity leading to downstream target protein phosphorylation; since αPIX can activate the “p21’’ small GTPases Rac1 or Cdc42 through its GEF activity, this αPIX/PAK/Rac complex exemplifies a scaffolding function. Structurally, αPIX assembles as a trimer through its carboxyl-terminal coiled-coil domain, and further interacts with dimers of GIT1 or GIT2 through a nearby GIT-binding domain to form oligomeric GIT-PIX complexes. Through this GIT-PIX complex, the scaffolding function of αPIX is amplified by also being able to hold GIT partners in proximity to αPIX partners. αPIX contains an amino-terminal Calponin Homology (CH) domain whose functions remain relatively poorly defined, but interacts with parvin/affixin family proteins.

Because the ARHGEF6 gene is located on the X chromosome so that males have only one copy, mutations in this gene in humans can cause X-chromosome-linked non-specific intellectual disability, as can mutations affecting its binding partner PAK3 whose gene is also located on the X chromosome. In animal models, loss of ARHGEF6 gene function is associated with neuronal synapse defects, immune T-cell migration and maturation defects, and hearing loss.

== Interactions ==
αPIX has been reported to interact with over 40 proteins.

Major interacting proteins include:

- Itself, or the highly-related ARHGEF7/βPIX via a trimeric coiled-coil interaction.
- GIT1 or GIT2 dimers via GIT-binding domain.
- p21-activated kinases (PAKs) 1, 2 and 3 via SH3 domain.
- c-Cbl via SH3 domain.
- Rho family GTP-binding protein family members Rac1 and Cdc42, activated via DHPH RhoGEF domain.

== See also ==
- Rho family of GTPases
- Scaffold protein
- Guanine nucleotide exchange factor
- X-linked intellectual disability
