= SHANK1 =

Protein-coding gene in the species Homo sapiens

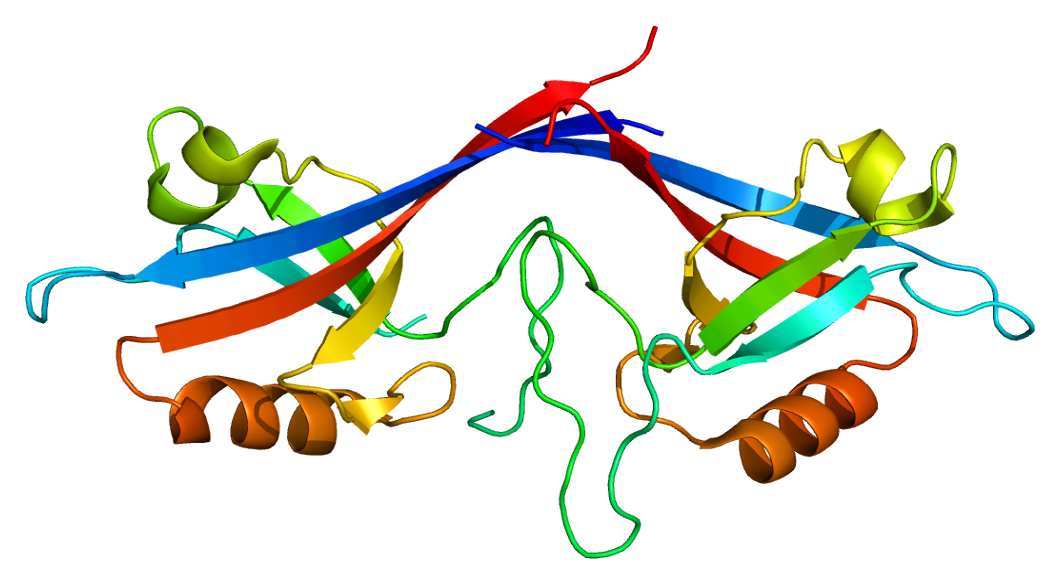

Identifiers
- Aliases: SHANK1, SPANK-1, SSTRIP, synamon, SH3 and multiple ankyrin repeat domains 1
- External IDs: OMIM: 604999; MGI: 3613677; GeneCards: SHANK1

Gene location (Human)
Chr.	Chromosome 19 (human)
Band	19q13.33	Start	50,659,255 bp
Band	19q13.33	End	50,719,802 bp

Gene location (Mouse)
Chr.	Chromosome 7 (mouse)
Band	7|7 B3	Start	43,959,677 bp
Band	7|7 B3	End	44,009,996 bp
RNA expression pattern
Bgee	Human / Mouse (ortholog); Top expressed in: anterior cingulate cortex; right frontal lobe; prefrontal cortex; amygdala; right hemisphere of cerebellum; primary visual cortex; dorsolateral prefrontal cortex; Brodmann area 9; hippocampus proper; middle temporal gyrus / Top expressed in: prefrontal cortex; primary motor cortex; temporal lobe; subiculum; cingulate gyrus; amygdala; lateral geniculate nucleus; piriform cortex; primary visual cortex; medial dorsal nucleus; More reference expression data
BioGPS	n/a
Gene ontology
Molecular function	somatostatin receptor binding; SH3 domain binding; ankyrin repeat binding; scaffold protein binding; protein C-terminus binding; protein binding; synaptic receptor adaptor activity; identical protein binding; ionotropic glutamate receptor binding; signaling receptor complex adaptor activity; protein-containing complex binding
Cellular component	cytoplasm; postsynaptic membrane; membrane; dendritic spine; synapse; excitatory synapse; intracellular anatomical structure; NMDA selective glutamate receptor complex; cell junction; dendrite; neuron projection; ionotropic glutamate receptor complex; postsynaptic density; cytosol; plasma membrane; Schaffer collateral - CA1 synapse; glutamatergic synapse; neuron spine
Biological process	cell differentiation; olfactory behavior; associative learning; neuromuscular process controlling balance; negative regulation of actin filament bundle assembly; positive regulation of dendritic spine development; nervous system development; regulation of AMPA receptor activity; dendritic spine morphogenesis; vocalization behavior; adult behavior; long-term memory; synapse maturation; positive regulation of excitatory postsynaptic potential; social behavior; habituation; determination of affect; righting reflex; protein localization to synapse; protein-containing complex assembly; postsynapse organization; synapse assembly; brain morphogenesis; synaptic assembly at neuromuscular junction; positive regulation of synaptic transmission, glutamatergic; long-term potentiation; postsynaptic density assembly
Sources:Amigo / QuickGO
Orthologs
Databases	NCBI: entry; OMA: entry
Species	Human	Mouse
Entrez	50944	243961
Ensembl	ENSG00000161681	ENSMUSG00000038738
UniProt	Q9Y566	D3YZU1
RefSeq (mRNA)	NM_016148	NM_001034115
RefSeq (protein)	NP_057232	NP_001029287
Location (UCSC)	Chr 19: 50.66 – 50.72 Mb	Chr 7: 43.96 – 44.01 Mb
PubMed search
- Wikidata
View/Edit Human	View/Edit Mouse

SH3 and multiple ankyrin repeat domains protein 1 is a protein that in humans is encoded by the SHANK1 gene.

== Interactions ==
SHANK1 has been shown to interact with:

- ARHGEF7,
- BAIAP2,
- DNM2,
- SPTAN1, and
- Somatostatin receptor 2.

== Clinical significance ==
SHANK1 is a scaffold protein that plays a critical role in the formation and maintenance of excitatory synapses in the brain. Mutations in the SHANK1 gene have been implicated in a number of neurodevelopmental disorders, including autism spectrum disorder (ASD), schizophrenia, and intellectual disability. In particular, the loss of SHANK1 expression has been linked to ASD, and SHANK1 mutations have been identified in individuals with ASD or other neurodevelopmental disorders. ASD, also known as "autism spectrum disorders", is identified as a group of conditions which cause characteristics in the human brain that lead to impairments. These impairments are such as communication, interest, and socialization issues or patterns of behavioral divergence.

Sato et al 2012 established the significant influence of the mutations and deletions of SHANK1 in males with ASD. This study consisted of 1,158 Canadian individuals and 456 European individuals who all had ASD. SHANK 1 is located on chromosome 19 in humans, while SHANK2 is located on chromosome 11, and SHANK3 on chromosome 22. The locus of SHANK1, in particular, is less studied in relation to ASD than SHANK2 and SHANK3. The objective of the study was to provide more context and analyze the specific protein, SHANK1, as a focal point for male ASD development caused by deletion, microdeletion, and/or mutation. Researchers found that a de novo deletion of the gene was males with high functioning ASD whereas 15,000 males used as a control group, did not have the deletion.

One particular focus of the study took 7 individuals which appeared to have deletions in chromosome 19 involving SHANK1. Of these 7, 4 were males who have high functioning ASD, which also happen to come from multigenerational detection of the inherited mutation and/ or deletion of SHANK1 gene. In that same group, 2 female individuals have SHANK1 deletion, however they did not present with ASD. The last individual of the group was a male who had an unrelated (not inherited) deletion of the SHANK1 gene while presenting ASD. Every individual in this study that presented with ASD was evaluated and diagnosed by an expert clinician using the Autism Diagnostic Observation Schedule (ADOS) and/or the Autism Diagnostic Interview-Revised (ADI-R). Individuals were selected from various hospitals and special clinical centers throughout Canada and Europe.

A laboratory test was run in order to identify the gene in the individuals using SYBR-Green-based real-time quantitative PCR (qPCR). The test was focused on family 1, the genetic locus in which the SHANK family is found. This allowed for primers to be used in order to establish the presence of any mutations, deletion, or microdeletions of SHANK1. Results indicated that deletion is 63.8 kb, and causes an elimination in exons 1-20 of the SHANK1 gene, as well as deletion in the gene CLEC11A. The CLEC11A gene (MIM 604713) is located on chromosome 2q14.1 and encodes a protein called osteoactivin. Osteoactivin is present in a variety of tissues, including bone, cartilage, and lung. The gene has been found to be a part of several biological processes, including bone remodeling, angiogenesis, and immune response. Mutations in the CLEC11A gene are associated with an increased risk of developing osteoporosis and other bone-related disorders.

In addition to SHANK1 being found to have developing ASD in males with the genetic deletion, the inheritance of the gene was also encountered from the chromosome of the studied individual which originated from the mother. It appeared that the mothers in these cases, carried two copies of the SHANK1 gene. This was not however, the case for presence of ASD in males with mutations of the gene, only deletion.

Researchers found that an unrelated ASD-affected male carrying an independent de novo deletion of SHANK1, supports the interpretation that the SHANK1 CNV segregating in family 1 is in fact the primary etiologic event which leads to the individual presenting ASD. In order to further support this claim, researchers also stated that continuous testing on case reports of multigenerational families would be required. The evidence supports that the mutation, deletion, or microdeletion of the SHANK1 gene is just as influential as SHANK2 and SHANK3 in causing male individuals to present with ASD.

The significance of the findings of the gene mutation extend beyond medical. They also provide understanding as to why there is a diagnosis bias for males versus females with ASD. It also allows for genetic interpretations of the differences in inherited forms of ASD and unrelated genetic mutations. This can have effects on the social aspect of an individual with ASD. Having tested and trusted evidence as to the origin of ASD is crucial as more and more people are diagnosed and the field of resources for these individuals continues to grow.
