= Haitham Amal =

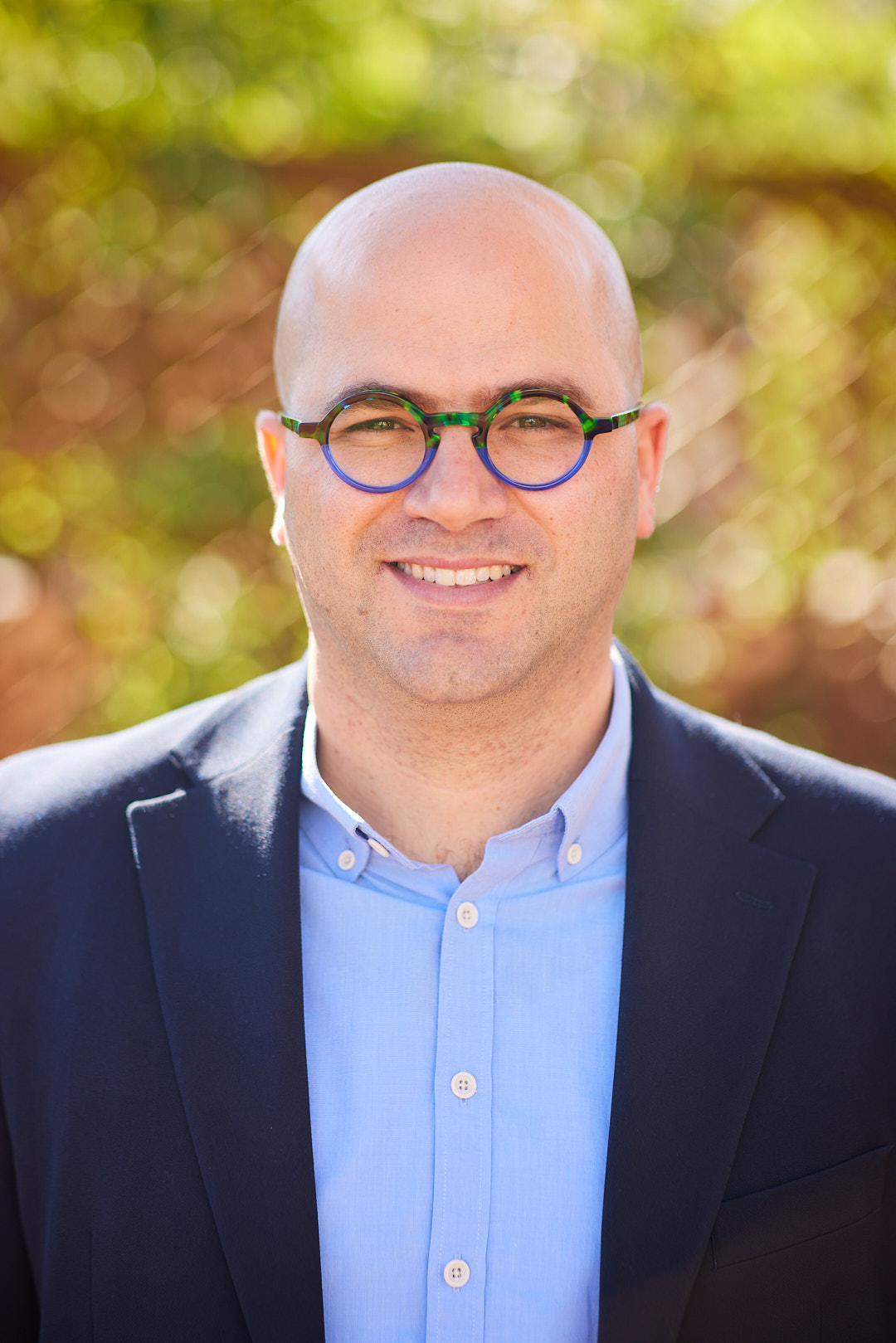
- Born: 1985 (age 40–41)
- Education: Tel Aviv University, Technion – Israel Institute of Technology, Massachusetts Institute of Technology
- Scientific career
- Fields: Neuropharmacology, Molecular biology, Autism
- Institutions: Hebrew University of Jerusalem, Harvard University

Haitham Amal (born October 14, 1985) is the Satell Family chair and professor of brain sciences and head of the laboratory of neuromics, cell signaling, and translational medicine at the Hebrew University of Jerusalem. He is recognized for his research on the role of nitric oxide in brain disorders, mainly Autism spectrum disorder (ASD).

== Education and career ==
Amal was born and raised in Haifa. He received a B.Sc. from the School of Pharmacy, Faculty of Medicine, Hebrew University of Jerusalem. He completed a MSc from the Department of Physiology and Pharmacology, Gray Faculty of Medical and Health Sciences, Tel Aviv University, where he researched the effects of cannabis on cognition and memory. In 2015, he earned a Ph.D. from the Department of Chemical Engineering and the Russell Berrie Nanotechnology Institute at the Technion – Israel Institute of Technology (2015). His doctoral thesis, titled “The unique chemical signature of cancer in exhaled breath”, was supervised by Hossam Haick. Amal was a Postdoctoral researcher at the Department of Biological Engineering, Massachusetts Institute of Technology (MIT), in the laboratory of Steven R. Tannenbaum from 2015 to 2019. His research involved proteomics, systems biology, biochemistry, pharmacology, and behavioral studies related to autism spectrum disorder and Alzheimer’s disease; during this period, he was an affiliate at the Stanley Center for Psychiatric Research, Broad Institute of MIT and Harvard University.

In 2019, Amal was appointed assistant professor at the Institute for Drug Research, School of Pharmacy, Faculty of Medicine, Hebrew University of Jerusalem, and in 2023 was appointed tenured associate professor. Since 2024, he has served as a visiting professor at Boston Children's Hospital and Harvard Medical School, Harvard University. He received research grants from the United States Department of Defense, the Israel Academy of Sciences and Humanities, and the German Research Foundation, and is the first international recipient of the Eagles Autism Foundation Research Grant. He was also awarded the Krill Prize from the Wolf Foundation. In 2025, He was named the Satell Family Chair for Brain Science. His laboratory is part of a research collective led by Stuart Lipton of the Scripps Research, which received a $17 million grant from the California Institute for Regenerative Medicine to study the link between environmental pollution and autism.

Amal is the founding partner of NeuroNOS, a company focused on the synthesis of small molecule therapeutics for autism spectrum disorder and other neurological conditions. It obtained an orphan drug designation from the FDA for the treatment of 22q13 deletion syndrome. Additionally, it received ophan drug designation for BA-101 for the treatment of Glioblastoma. He co-founded Point6 Bio, a company developing diagnostic models based on biomarkers for neurological disorders.

== Family ==
Haitham Amal is married to Rageda, an art therapist specializing in autism; they reside in Boston with their two children.

== Research ==
Amal’s research focuses on the biochemical pathways underlying neurological diseases. His work identifies nitric oxide (NO) as a regulator of neuronal development and synaptic plasticity via S-nitrosylation, particularly in Autism spectrum disorder (ASD). Analysis using SNOTRAP mass spectrometry indicates that SHANK3 mutations disrupt S-nitrosylation in the cortex and striatum, affecting proteins associated with vesicle release and synaptic transmission. Research on mitochondrial dysfunction in ASD has identified deficits in energy metabolism and the electron transport chain, alongside imbalances in calcium, oxidative stress, and apoptotic signaling that impact synaptic development. A study on mice found that arsenic induces cognitive deficits similar to those observed in ASD and Alzheimer’s disease. Mass spectrometry showed S-nitrosylation in mitochondrial and cell-death proteins, suggesting a convergence of environmental and genetic factors on nitric oxide pathways. Research indicates that NO contributes to ASD pathogenesis in Shank3 and CNTNAP2 models. The inhibition of neuronal NO synthase reversed molecular and behavioral phenotypes in mice and human iPSCs-derived neurons, suggesting NO as a potential therapeutic target. A comparative study identified similar synaptic and behavioral phenotypes in juvenile Shank3 and Cntnap2 mice across both sexes. These consistent molecular alterations suggest that neurodevelopmental disruptions resulting from these mutations manifest regardless of sex. An examination of environmental factors indicates that air pollution increases ASD risk by inducing neuroinflammation and oxidative stress. This effect appears most pronounced during prenatal development and early childhood among genetically susceptible individuals.

Amal developed diagnostic tools. He utilized nanoarray breath analysis to detect gastric cancer and precancerous lesions, and participated in the development of an AI nanoarray using gold and carbon nanoparticles to diagnose 17 diseases via exhaled breath with 86% accuracy. By identifying 13 conditions, it serves as a noninvasive screening method. He examined an application of breath analysis to identify ovarian cancer via volatile markers, achieving 71% diagnostic accuracy in malignant cases. In another study, Nanomaterial sensors analyzed VOCs fingerprints in HCC cell cultures, differentiating normal cells from those with varying metastatic potential. This suggests a non-invasive prognostic tool for subclinical metastasis.
