= BMF =

BMF may refer to:

- BMF, IATA code for Bakouma Airport in the Central African Republic
- Bcl-2-modifying factor, the protein encoded by the gene BMF
- BMF (record label), based in Ireland
- Be Military Fit, a UK fitness company (previously called British Military Fitness)
- Bird–Meertens formalism, a calculus for deriving computer programs from specifications
- Black Mafia Family, a former drug trafficking organization originally based in Detroit, Michigan
  - BMF (TV series), a 2021 television series about the Black Mafia Family
- Boston MedFlight
- Budapesti Műszaki Főiskola (Budapest Technical College), former name of Óbuda University
- British Marine Federation
- British Motorcyclists Federation
- British Museum Friends
- British Muslim Forum
- Bundesministerium der Finanzen, the German Federal Ministry of Finance
- Bundesministerium für Finanzen, the Austrian Ministry of Finance
- "B.M.F. (Blowin' Money Fast)", a song by Rick Ross
- Brain Mapping Foundation
- Bad motherfucker
- The BMF belt, a symbolic title handed out at UFC 244
- "BMF" (song), by SZA
