= TMEM132B =

Protein encoding gene in humans

Identifiers
- Aliases: TMEM132B, transmembrane protein 132B
- External IDs: MGI: 3609245; HomoloGene: 28135; GeneCards: TMEM132B; OMA:TMEM132B - orthologs

Gene location (Human)
Chr.	Chromosome 12 (human)
Band	12q24.31-q24.32	Start	125,186,386 bp
Band	12q24.31-q24.32	End	125,662,377 bp

Gene location (Mouse)
Chr.	Chromosome 5 (mouse)
Band	5|5 G1.1	Start	125,608,838 bp
Band	5|5 G1.1	End	125,869,647 bp
RNA expression pattern
Bgee	Human / Mouse (ortholog); Top expressed in: ventricular zone; ganglionic eminence; endothelial cell; middle temporal gyrus; Brodmann area 23; Brodmann area 46; sural nerve; superior frontal gyrus; prefrontal cortex; primary visual cortex / Top expressed in: dentate gyrus of hippocampal formation granule cell; superior frontal gyrus; hippocampus proper; primary visual cortex; ventricular zone; striatum of neuraxis; secondary oocyte; zygote; primary oocyte; hypothalamus; More reference expression data
BioGPS	n/a
Gene ontology
Molecular function	molecular function
Cellular component	membrane; integral component of membrane; cellular component
Biological process	biological process
Sources:Amigo / QuickGO
Orthologs
Species	Human	Mouse
Entrez	114795	208151
Ensembl	ENSG00000139364	ENSMUSG00000070498
UniProt	Q14DG7	n/a
RefSeq (mRNA)	NM_001286219; NM_052907; NM_001366854	NM_001190352
RefSeq (protein)	NP_001273148; NP_443139; NP_001353783	n/a
Location (UCSC)	Chr 12: 125.19 – 125.66 Mb	Chr 5: 125.61 – 125.87 Mb
PubMed search
- Wikidata
View/Edit Human	View/Edit Mouse

Transmembrane protein 132B is a protein encoding gene that encodes the human TMEM132B protein. Variant 1 of human TMEM132B consists of 1078 amino acids.

== Gene ==
The TMEM132B gene is located on chromosome 12 at 12q24.31 and contains 18 exons. In humans, exons 1-9 include the coding region and exons 10-18 include only 3' untranslated region (UTR). TMEM132B primarily localizes in the cytoplasm.

== Expression ==
Human TMEM132B is expressed in the brain as well as the fetal brain. Small amounts of TMEM132B have been found in the thyroid, salivary gland, prostate, intestinal organs, and the placenta.

TMEM132B is expressed under various conditions, most of which occur in the brain. One example of TMEM132B expression in the brain is seen in Parkinson's disease, particularly in the substantia nigra. The substantia nigra is located in the basal ganglia of the brain and is essential for controlling body movements. Microarray data suggests that individuals with Parkinson's disease have moderate to low TMEM132B expression (68%–75%) compared to those without Parkinson's disease (75%–91%).

== Protein ==
The human TMEM132B gene encodes a protein of 1078 amnio acids in length. Human TMEME132B has one transmembrane region and three N-glycosylation sites. TMEM132B has a predicted molecular weight of 119.5 kD and a predicted isoelectric point (pI) of 5.

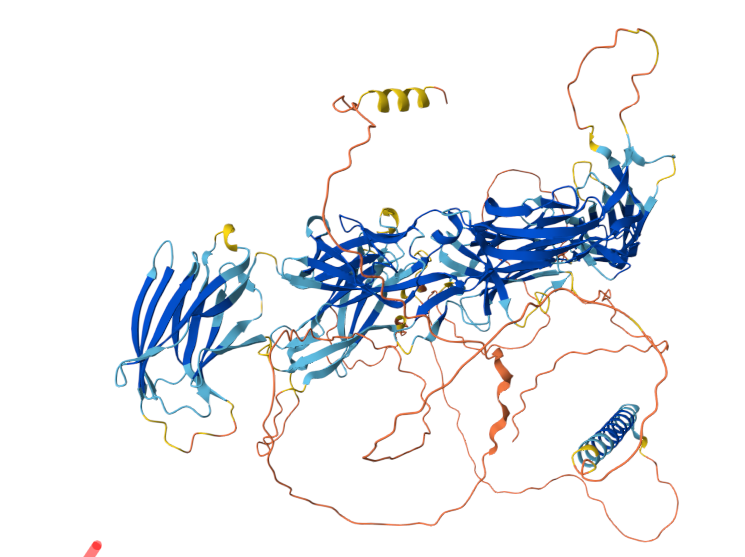
Tertiary structure for TMEM132B according to AlphaFold.

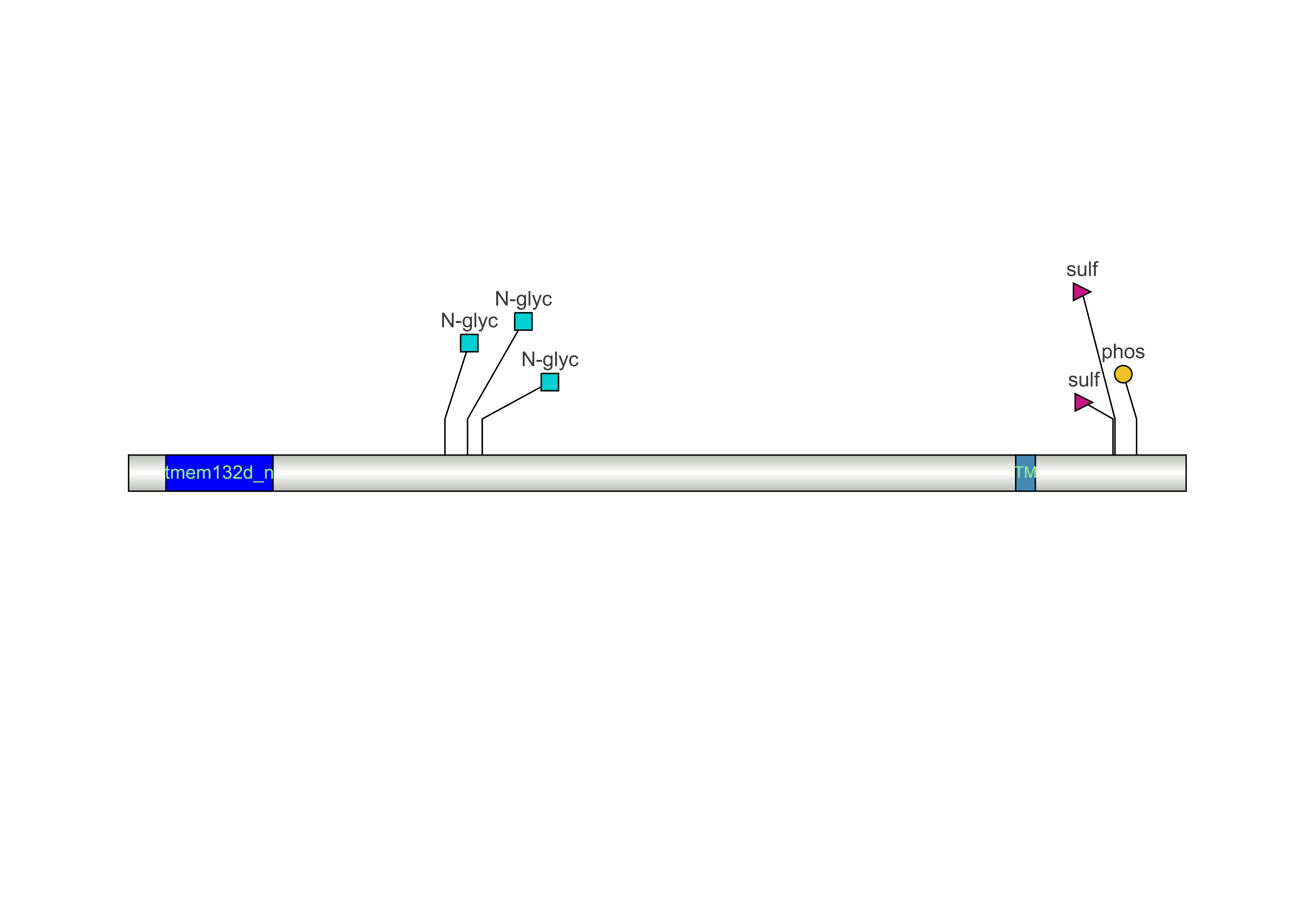
Schematic of Human TMEM132B. Yellow circles indicate phosphorylation sites, pink triangles indicate sulfonation sites, and cyan squares indicate glycosylation sites.

=== Interacting Proteins ===
TMEM132B has different proteins that interact with it. There are four main proteins that were found to have interactions with TMEM132B. Of the four that were found, two are located in the cytoplasm, one is in the cytosol, and one is in the postsynaptic membrane (see table 1).

Table 1. Proteins that interact with TMEM132B and their function.
Full Name	Abbreviated Name	Protein Function	Basis of Identification	Cell Location
Guanylate kinase-associated protein	DIgap1	Plays a role in the function and structure of synapse and is a scaffolding protein.	Anti bait co-immunoprecipitation	Intracellular side of the postsynaptic membrane
SNAP-25-interacting protein	Scrin1	In the SNARE complex. Regulates kinase activity and postsynaptic organization in the cytoplasm and cytoskeleton.	Cross-linking study	Cytoplasm
Ring finger protein 123	RNF123	Innate antiviral signaling inhibitor. Has E3 ubiquitin ligase activity. Cyclin-dependent kinase inhibitor.	Affinity Capture-MS	Cytoplasm and nucleus
Peptidylprolyl isomerase A (cyclophilin A)	PPIA	Protein folding enzyme. Important in protein folding and catalyzing certain peptide bonds.	Cross-Linking-MS (XL-MS)	Cytosol. It can be secreted to extracellular regions

== Evolution ==
=== Orthologs ===
Ortholog sequences for TMEM132B were found in primates, mammals, reptiles, birds, and amphibians. Amphibians were the last taxon group found that contained TMEM132B. Ortholog sequences were organized by median date of divergence with the farthest date of divergence being 352 MYA. See Table 2.

Table 2. 20 orthologs for TMEM132B.
Seq	Genus species	Common name	Taxon	Date of Div (MYA)	Seq Length (AA)	Seq ID %	Seq similarity %
1	Homo sapiens	Humans	Primates	0	1078	100	100
2	Theropithecus gelada	Gelada	Primates	29	1078	98.8	99.1
3	Chlorocebus sabaeus	Green Monkey	Primates	29	1083	96.3	97.1
4	Lemur catta	Ring-Tailed Lemur	Primates	74	1183	84.8	87.1
5	Mus musculus	House Mouse	Rodentia	87	1078	84.7	90.8
6	Bubalus bubalis	Water Buffalo	Even-Toed Ungulates	94	1084	86.4	92.4
7	Lynx rufus	Bobcat	Carnivore	94	1099	84.8	91.1
8	Monodelphis domestica	Gray Short-Tailed Opossum	Didelphidae	160	709	84.65	65.0
9	Vombatus ursinus	Common Wombat	Diprotodontia	160	1066	77.6	86.3
10	Tachyglossus aculeatus	Short-Beaked Echidna	Monotremata	180	1094	72.9	83.3
11	Terrapene triunguis	Three-Toed Box Turtle	Testudines	319	1090	71.8	82.2
12	Gallus gallus	Chicken	Aves	319	1062	71.3	82.6
13	Rhea pennata	Darwin's Rhea	Aves	319	1086	70.1	81.7
14	Gymnogyps californianus	California Condor	Aves	319	1087	69.9	81.0
15	Rhinatrema bivittatum	Two-Lined Caecilian	Caecilian	352	1087	66.3	79.3
16	Pelobates fuscus	Common Spadefoot	Pelobatidae	352	1108	62.1	74.6
17	Bufo bufo	Common Toad	Anura	352	1089	62.0	75.6
18	Pleurodeles waltl	Iberian Ribbed Newt	Salamander	352	1097	61.7	73.7
19	Xenopus laevis	African Clawed Frog	Anura	352	1101	59.8	74.0
20	Ambystoma mexicanum	Axolotl	Salamander	352	1122	59.7	73.0

=== Paralogs ===
TMEM132B has a lot of paralogs in humans. The main paralogs were TMEM132A, TMEM132C, TMEM132D, and TMEM132E. These four paralogs are what make up the human TMEM132 family.

Table 3. Paralogs for TMEM132B.
Sequence	Accession #	Seq Length (AA)	E-value	Identity %
TMEM132B	NP_443139.2	1078	0	100%
TMEM132D	KAI2568702.1	637	0	52.50%
TMEM132C	KAI2568693.1	1108	0	52.21%
TMEM132E	KAI2582325.1	1074	0	35.78%
TMEM132A	KAI2560231.1	1024	3.00E-133	34.37%
