= DYNLL2 =

Protein-coding gene in the species Homo sapiens

Identifiers
- Aliases: DYNLL2, DNCL1B, Dlc2, RSPH22, dynein light chain LC8-type 2
- External IDs: OMIM: 608942; MGI: 1915347; GeneCards: DYNLL2
Available structures
PDB	Ortholog search: PDBe RCSB
PDB	List of PDB id codes 2XQQ, 3P8M, 4D07, 1PWJ

Gene location (Human)
Chr.	Chromosome 17 (human)
Band	17q22	Start	58,083,419 bp
Band	17q22	End	58,095,542 bp

Gene location (Mouse)
Chr.	Chromosome 11 (mouse)
Band	11|11 C	Start	87,870,351 bp
Band	11|11 C	End	87,878,359 bp
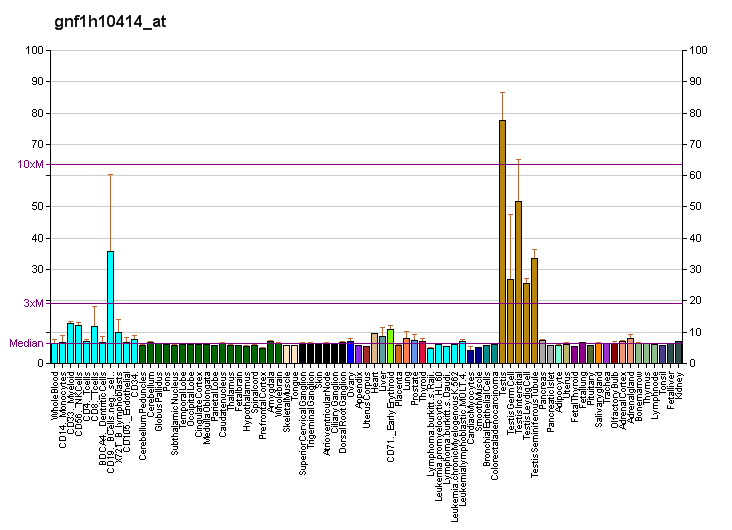
RNA expression pattern
Bgee	Human / Mouse (ortholog); Top expressed in: internal globus pallidus; myocardium of left ventricle; sperm; cardiac muscle tissue of right atrium; skin of arm; mucosa of ileum; pons; superior vestibular nucleus; pars compacta; ventral tegmental area / Top expressed in: motor neuron; mammillary body; lateral hypothalamus; lateral geniculate nucleus; seminiferous tubule; ventromedial nucleus; medial vestibular nucleus; dorsomedial hypothalamic nucleus; cingulate gyrus; lateral septal nucleus; More reference expression data
BioGPS	More reference expression data
Gene ontology
Molecular function	cytoskeletal motor activity; protein binding; plus-end-directed microtubule motor activity; dynein intermediate chain binding; dynein light intermediate chain binding; cytoskeletal protein binding; protein homodimerization activity; protein heterodimerization activity; scaffold protein binding
Cellular component	cytoplasm; cytosol; nucleus; membrane; ciliary tip; centrosome; microtubule; plasma membrane; microtubule associated complex; dynein complex; cytoskeleton; mitochondrion; cilium; myosin V complex; cytoplasmic dynein complex; myosin complex; postsynaptic density; postsynapse; glutamatergic synapse
Biological process	microtubule-based process; antigen processing and presentation of exogenous peptide antigen via MHC class II; endoplasmic reticulum to Golgi vesicle-mediated transport; positive regulation of protein insertion into mitochondrial membrane involved in apoptotic signaling pathway; macroautophagy; intraciliary transport involved in cilium assembly; transport along microtubule; cilium assembly; sister chromatid cohesion; transport
Sources:Amigo / QuickGO
Orthologs
Databases	NCBI: entry; OMA: entry
Species	Human	Mouse
Entrez	140735	68097
Ensembl	ENSG00000264364	ENSMUSG00000020483
UniProt	Q96FJ2	Q9D0M5
RefSeq (mRNA)	NM_080677	NM_001168471; NM_001168472; NM_026556
RefSeq (protein)	NP_542408	NP_001161943; NP_001161944; NP_080832
Location (UCSC)	Chr 17: 58.08 – 58.1 Mb	Chr 11: 87.87 – 87.88 Mb
PubMed search
- Wikidata
View/Edit Human	View/Edit Mouse

Dynein light chain 2, cytoplasmic is a protein that in humans is encoded by the DYNLL2 gene.

== Interactions ==
DYNLL2 has been shown to interact with DLG4, REDIC1, DLGAP1, MYO5A and BMF.
