= REDIC1 =

Protein-coding gene in humans

Identifiers
- Aliases: REDIC1, HEL-206, HEL-S-94, chromosome 12 open reading frame 40, C12orf40, Regulator Of DNA Class I Crossover Intermediates 1
- External IDs: GeneCards: REDIC1

Gene location (Human)
Chr.	Chromosome 12 (human)
Band	12q12	Start	39,626,167 bp
Band	12q12	End	39,908,300 bp
RNA expression pattern
Bgee	Human / Mouse (ortholog); Top expressed in: testicle; secondary oocyte; sperm; gonad; right testis; left testis; amniotic fluid; tonsil; subcutaneous adipose tissue; exocrine gland / n/a; More reference expression data
BioGPS	n/a
Orthologs
Databases	NCBI: entry; OMA: entry
Species	Human	Mouse
Entrez	283461	n/a
Ensembl	ENSG00000180116	n/a
UniProt	Q86WS4	n/a
RefSeq (mRNA)	NM_001031748; NM_001319247	n/a
RefSeq (protein)	NP_001026918; NP_001306176	n/a
Location (UCSC)	Chr 12: 39.63 – 39.91 Mb	n/a
PubMed search		n/a
- Wikidata
View/Edit Human

Regulator of DNA class I crossover intermediates 1, is a protein which in humans is encoded by the gene REDIC1 (previously C12orf40). It is involved in the process of recombination during meiosis.

== Gene ==
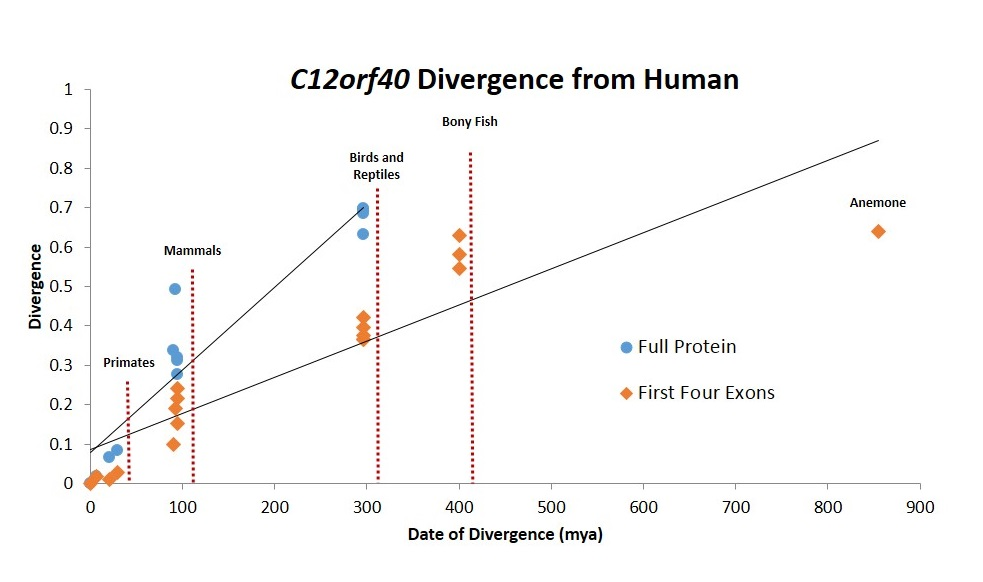
Evolution of the C12orf40 gene (and its more conserved sub-region of the first 4 exons) across several taxa. Information available from NCBI BLAST software.

=== Human gene ===
In humans, the gene for C12orf40 is located on chromosome 12. There are 13 exons in the canonical isoform that is transcribed into an mRNA of 2797 base pairs. Three other isoforms have been isolated.

=== Evolution ===
Homologs exist as distant as the green sea turtle and chickens at approximately 60% sequence identity, suggesting that the gene may have arisen in the amniotes after their divergence from other tetrapods; the first 4 exons are conserved with 36% identity as distantly as sea anemones.

== Protein ==
=== Properties ===
The human C12orf40 protein is 652 amino acids in length. Its molecular weight is predicted to be 74.52 kDa, and its isoelectric point 7.822. Amino acids 229-652 contain a domain of unknown function (DUF4552) which is conserved in vertebrates. C12orf40 is predicted to be a soluble protein with no transmembrane segments. Its secondary and tertiary structures are not currently known.

=== Interactions ===
Experimental evidence shows that C12orf40 has a physical interaction with dynein light chain 2 (DYNLL2). This protein is part of a complex that regulates the function of the motor protein dynein.

=== Expression ===
Within the cell, C12orf40 is predicted to be present in the nucleus based on signals within its sequence. An analysis of normal human tissues shows that C12orf40 expression occurs primarily in the testis, suggesting importance to the male reproductive system.

=== Clinical significance ===
The function of C12orf40 is not yet well understood. However, the three prime untranslated region (3' UTR) of C12orf40 is highly similar to the 3' UTR of the cystic fibrosis transmembrane conductance regulator (CFTR), which may mean that the two genes share certain expression patterns. In the fibroblasts of hypertrophic scars, exposure to the immunosuppressant Tacrolimus causes C12orf40 up-regulation. In pigs, a region homologous to human C12orf40 plays a role in arthrogryposis, a disease characterized by congenital fibrosis. The common thread of these studies suggests that C12orf40 may have a connection to the formation of healthy connective tissue.
