= DNM2 =

Protein-coding gene in the species Homo sapiens

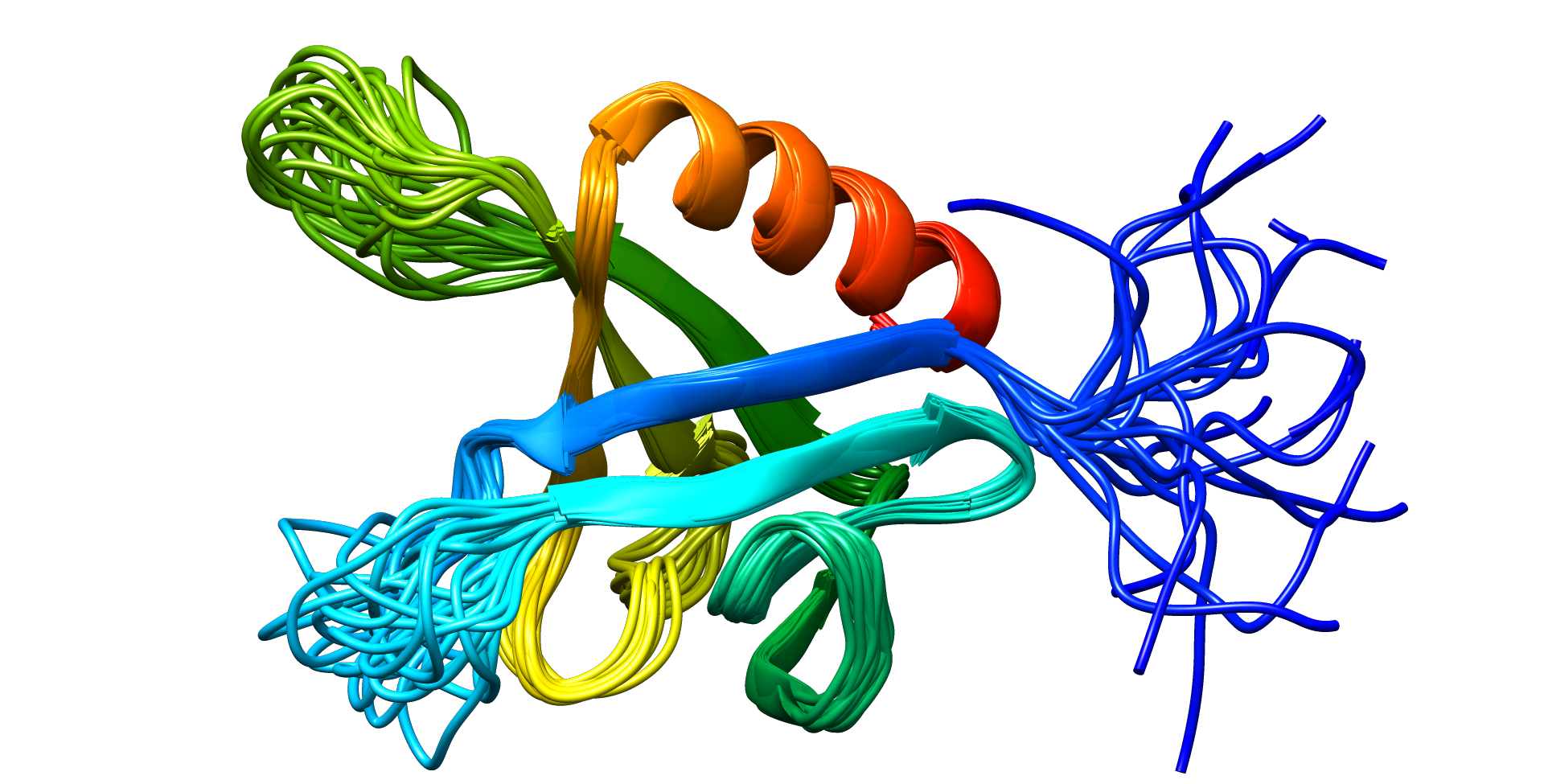

Identifiers
- Aliases: DNM2, CMT2M, CMTDI1, CMTDIB, DI-CMTB, DYN2, DYNII, LCCS5, dynamin 2
- External IDs: OMIM: 602378; MGI: 109547; GeneCards: DNM2
Available structures
PDB	Ortholog search: PDBe RCSB
PDB	List of PDB id codes 2YS1
Enzyme activity
EC #	BRENDA	ExPASy	KEGG	MetaCyc
3.6.5.5	↗	↗	↗	↗

Gene location (Human)
Chr.	Chromosome 19 (human)
Band	19p13.2	Start	10,718,055 bp
Band	19p13.2	End	10,833,488 bp

Gene location (Mouse)
Chr.	Chromosome 9 (mouse)
Band	9 A3|9 7.79 cM	Start	21,336,204 bp
Band	9 A3|9 7.79 cM	End	21,419,055 bp
RNA expression pattern
Bgee	Human / Mouse (ortholog); Top expressed in: granulocyte; mucosa of transverse colon; skin of leg; right lung; upper lobe of left lung; rectum; skin of abdomen; body of stomach; apex of heart; gastric mucosa / Top expressed in: granulocyte; renal corpuscle; ankle joint; lip; ascending aorta; tail of embryo; aortic valve; medullary collecting duct; endocardial cushion; secondary oocyte; More reference expression data
BioGPS	n/a
Gene ontology
Molecular function	nucleotide binding; nitric-oxide synthase binding; SH3 domain binding; phosphatidylinositol 3-kinase regulatory subunit binding; D2 dopamine receptor binding; GTP binding; protein binding; WW domain binding; protein-containing complex binding; enzyme binding; hydrolase activity; protein kinase binding; GTPase activity; microtubule binding
Cellular component	endocytic vesicle membrane; cytosol; endosome; centrosome; Golgi apparatus; postsynaptic membrane; membrane; postsynaptic density; focal adhesion; photoreceptor inner segment; clathrin-coated endocytic vesicle; Golgi membrane; plasma membrane; synapse; ruffle membrane; cell junction; trans-Golgi network; midbody; growth cone; perinuclear region of cytoplasm; clathrin-coated pit; phagocytic cup; microtubule; extracellular exosome; cytoskeleton; nucleus; lamellipodium; cell projection; cytoplasmic vesicle; phagocytic vesicle membrane; cytoplasm; mitochondrial membranes; axon; protein-containing complex; dendritic spine; dendritic spine head; presynapse; postsynaptic endocytic zone membrane; glutamatergic synapse; postsynaptic density, intracellular component
Biological process	negative regulation of membrane tubulation; G protein-coupled receptor internalization; positive regulation of phagocytosis; neuron projection morphogenesis; regulation of transcription, DNA-templated; endocytosis; regulation of axon extension; ventricular septum development; antigen processing and presentation of exogenous peptide antigen via MHC class II; transferrin transport; response to light stimulus; cellular response to X-ray; positive regulation of nitric oxide biosynthetic process; cellular response to dopamine; regulation of nitric-oxide synthase activity; receptor internalization; regulation of Rac protein signal transduction; negative regulation of transforming growth factor beta receptor signaling pathway; receptor-mediated endocytosis; coronary vasculature development; positive regulation of transcription, DNA-templated; positive regulation of P-type sodium:potassium-exchanging transporter activity; aorta development; positive regulation of endocytosis; positive regulation of substrate adhesion-dependent cell spreading; regulation of Golgi organization; G2/M transition of mitotic cell cycle; macropinocytosis; spermatogenesis; positive regulation of apoptotic process; synaptic vesicle transport; cellular response to nitric oxide; positive regulation of lamellipodium assembly; Golgi to plasma membrane transport; cellular response to carbon monoxide; signal transduction; response to cocaine; phagocytosis; mitochondrial fission; dynamin family protein polymerization involved in mitochondrial fission; membrane organization; membrane fusion; negative regulation of non-motile cilium assembly; synaptic vesicle budding from presynaptic endocytic zone membrane; synaptic vesicle endocytosis; regulation of synapse structure or activity; postsynaptic neurotransmitter receptor internalization; positive regulation of clathrin-dependent endocytosis
Sources:Amigo / QuickGO
Orthologs
Databases	NCBI: entry; OMA: entry
Species	Human	Mouse
Entrez	1785	13430
Ensembl	ENSG00000079805	ENSMUSG00000033335
UniProt	P50570	P39054
RefSeq (mRNA)	NM_004945; NM_001005360; NM_001005361; NM_001005362; NM_001190716	NM_001039520; NM_001253893; NM_001253894; NM_007871; NM_001357718 NM_001357719; NM_001357721
RefSeq (protein)	NP_001005360; NP_001005361; NP_001005362; NP_001177645; NP_004936	NP_001034609; NP_001240822; NP_001240823; NP_031897; NP_001344647 NP_001344648; NP_001344650
Location (UCSC)	Chr 19: 10.72 – 10.83 Mb	Chr 9: 21.34 – 21.42 Mb
PubMed search
- Wikidata
View/Edit Human	View/Edit Mouse

Dynamin-2 is a protein that in humans is encoded by the DNM2 gene.

== Function ==
Dynamins represent one of the subfamilies of GTP-binding proteins. These proteins share considerable sequence similarity over the N-terminal portion of the molecule, which contains the GTPase domain. Dynamins are associated with microtubules. They have been implicated in cell processes such as endocytosis and cell motility, and in alterations of the membrane that accompany certain activities such as bone resorption by osteoclasts. Dynamins bind many proteins that bind actin and other cytoskeletal proteins. Dynamins can also self-assemble, a process that stimulates GTPase activity. Four alternatively spliced transcripts encoding different proteins have been described. Additional alternatively spliced transcripts may exist, but their full-length nature has not been determined.

== Interactions ==
DNM2 has been shown to interact with:

- SHANK1,
- SHANK2, and
- SNX9.

== Clinical relevance ==
Mutations in this gene have been associated to cases of acute lymphoblastic leukaemia or congenital myopathy (centronuclear type).
