= Bcl-2-modifying factor =

Protein found in humans

BMF

Identifiers
- Aliases: BMF, Bcl2 modifying factor
- External IDs: OMIM: 606266; MGI: 2176433; GeneCards: BMF
Available structures
PDB	Ortholog search: PDBe RCSB
PDB	List of PDB id codes 2VOG

Gene location (Human)
Chr.	Chromosome 15 (human)
Band	15q15.1	Start	40,087,890 bp
Band	15q15.1	End	40,108,892 bp

Gene location (Mouse)
Chr.	Chromosome 2 (mouse)
Band	2|2 E5	Start	118,359,238 bp
Band	2|2 E5	End	118,380,168 bp
RNA expression pattern
Bgee	Human / Mouse (ortholog); Top expressed in: monocyte; bone marrow cell; granulocyte; islet of Langerhans; right lobe of thyroid gland; left lobe of thyroid gland; gallbladder; spleen; appendix; duodenum / Top expressed in: external carotid artery; internal carotid artery; medullary collecting duct; hand; trigeminal ganglion; left lung lobe; vas deferens; superior cervical ganglion; utricle; prostate; More reference expression data
BioGPS	n/a
Gene ontology
Molecular function	protein binding
Cellular component	mitochondrial outer membrane; cytosol; plasma membrane; acrosomal vesicle; myosin complex
Biological process	positive regulation of protein homooligomerization; positive regulation of release of cytochrome c from mitochondria; anoikis; positive regulation of intrinsic apoptotic signaling pathway; protein insertion into mitochondrial membrane involved in apoptotic signaling pathway; apoptotic process; positive regulation of apoptotic process; negative regulation of autophagy; cellular response to UV
Sources:Amigo / QuickGO
Orthologs
Databases	NCBI: entry; OMA: entry
Species	Human	Mouse
Entrez	90427	171543
Ensembl	ENSG00000104081	ENSMUSG00000040093
UniProt	Q96LC9	Q91ZE9
RefSeq (mRNA)	NM_001003940; NM_001003942; NM_001003943; NM_033503	NM_138313; NM_001311140; NM_001331221
RefSeq (protein)	NP_001003940; NP_001003942; NP_001003943; NP_277038	NP_001298069; NP_001318150; NP_612186
Location (UCSC)	Chr 15: 40.09 – 40.11 Mb	Chr 2: 118.36 – 118.38 Mb
PubMed search
- Wikidata
View/Edit Human	View/Edit Mouse

Bcl-2-modifying factor is a protein that in humans is encoded by the BMF gene.

The protein encoded by this gene belongs to the BCL2 protein family. BCL2 family members form hetero- or homodimers and act as anti- or pro-apoptotic regulators that are involved in a wide variety of cellular activities. This protein contains a single BCL2 homology domain 3 (BH3), and has been shown to bind BCL2 proteins and function as an apoptotic activator. This protein is found to be sequestered to myosin V motors by its association with dynein light chain 2, which may be important for sensing intracellular damage and triggering apoptosis. Alternatively spliced transcript variants encoding different isoforms have been identified.

== Interactions ==
Bcl-2-modifying factor has been shown to interact with Bcl-2 and DYNLL2.
