= DLGAP1 =

Protein-coding gene in the species Homo sapiens

Identifiers
- Aliases: DLGAP1, DAP-1, DAP-1-ALPHA, DAP-1-BETA, DAP1, DLGAP1A, DLGAP1B, GKAP, SAPAP1, hGKAP, discs large homolog associated protein 1, DLG associated protein 1
- External IDs: OMIM: 605445; MGI: 1346065; GeneCards: DLGAP1

Gene location (Human)
Chr.	Chromosome 18 (human)
Band	18p11.31	Start	3,496,032 bp
Band	18p11.31	End	4,455,307 bp

Gene location (Mouse)
Chr.	Chromosome 17 (mouse)
Band	17 E1.3|17 40.85 cM	Start	70,276,068 bp
Band	17 E1.3|17 40.85 cM	End	71,128,408 bp
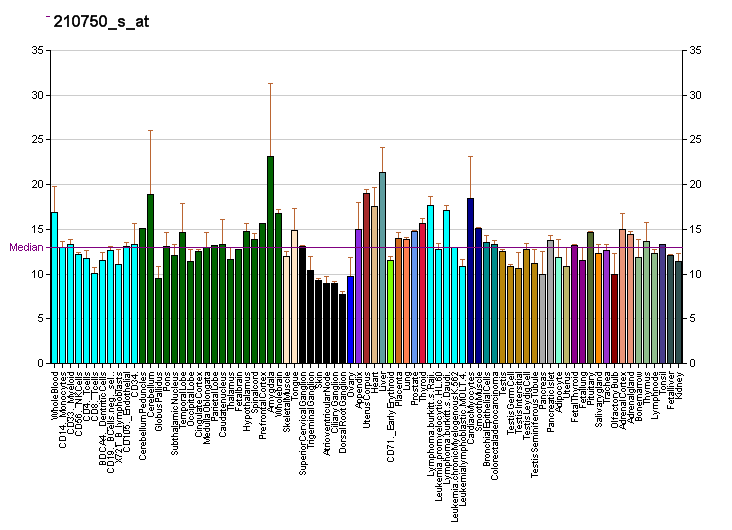

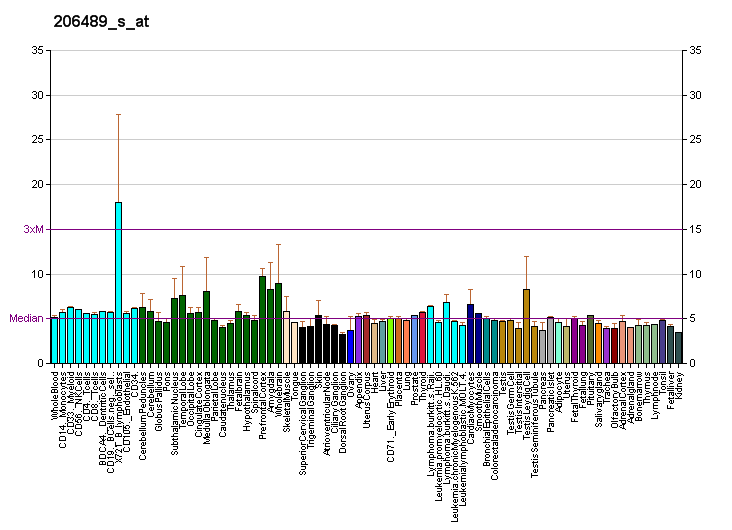
RNA expression pattern
Bgee	Human / Mouse (ortholog); Top expressed in: Brodmann area 23; endothelial cell; primary visual cortex; prefrontal cortex; pons; dorsolateral prefrontal cortex; Brodmann area 9; parietal lobe; superior frontal gyrus; right frontal lobe / Top expressed in: piriform cortex; subiculum; primary motor cortex; cingulate gyrus; subdivision of hippocampus; Region I of hippocampus proper; lateral septal nucleus; cerebellar vermis; lobe of cerebellum; anterior amygdaloid area; More reference expression data
BioGPS	More reference expression data
Gene ontology
Molecular function	protein binding; protein domain specific binding; protein-containing complex binding
Cellular component	cell junction; postsynaptic membrane; postsynaptic density; membrane; plasma membrane; synapse; cellular component
Biological process	signaling; chemical synaptic transmission
Sources:Amigo / QuickGO
Orthologs
Databases	NCBI: entry; OMA: entry
Species	Human	Mouse
Entrez	9229	224997
Ensembl	ENSG00000170579	ENSMUSG00000003279
UniProt	O14490	Q9D415
RefSeq (mRNA)	NM_001003809; NM_001242761; NM_001242762; NM_001242763; NM_001242764 NM_001242765; NM_001242766; NM_001308390; NM_004746	NM_001128180; NM_001128181; NM_027712; NM_177639; NM_001347411 NM_001347412; NM_001347413; NM_001347414; NM_001360665
RefSeq (protein)	NP_001003809; NP_001229690; NP_001229691; NP_001229692; NP_001229693 NP_001229694; NP_001229695; NP_001295319; NP_004737	NP_001121652; NP_001121653; NP_001334340; NP_001334341; NP_001334342 NP_001334343; NP_081988; NP_808307; NP_001347594
Location (UCSC)	Chr 18: 3.5 – 4.46 Mb	Chr 17: 70.28 – 71.13 Mb
PubMed search
- Wikidata
View/Edit Human	View/Edit Mouse

Disks large-associated protein 1 (DAP-1), also known as guanylate kinase-associated protein (GKAP), is a protein that in humans is encoded by the DLGAP1 gene. DAP-1 is known to be highly enriched in synaptosomal preparations of the brain, and present in the post-synaptic density.

== Function ==
This gene encodes the protein called guanylate kinase-associated protein (GKAP). GKAP binds to the SHANK2 and PSD-95 proteins, facilitating the assembly of the post-synaptic density of neurons. Dlgap1 has five 14-amino-acid repeats and three Pro-rich portions.

== Interactions ==
DLGAP1 has been shown to interact with:

- DLG1
- DLG4
- DYNLL1
- DYNLL2
- SHANK2

The interaction with PSD95 and S-SCAM is mediated by the GUK domain and it has been hypothesized that this might mean it can also interact with other GUK containing proteins.
