= 22q13 deletion syndrome =

Rare genetic syndrome

- Other names: Phelan–McDermid syndrome
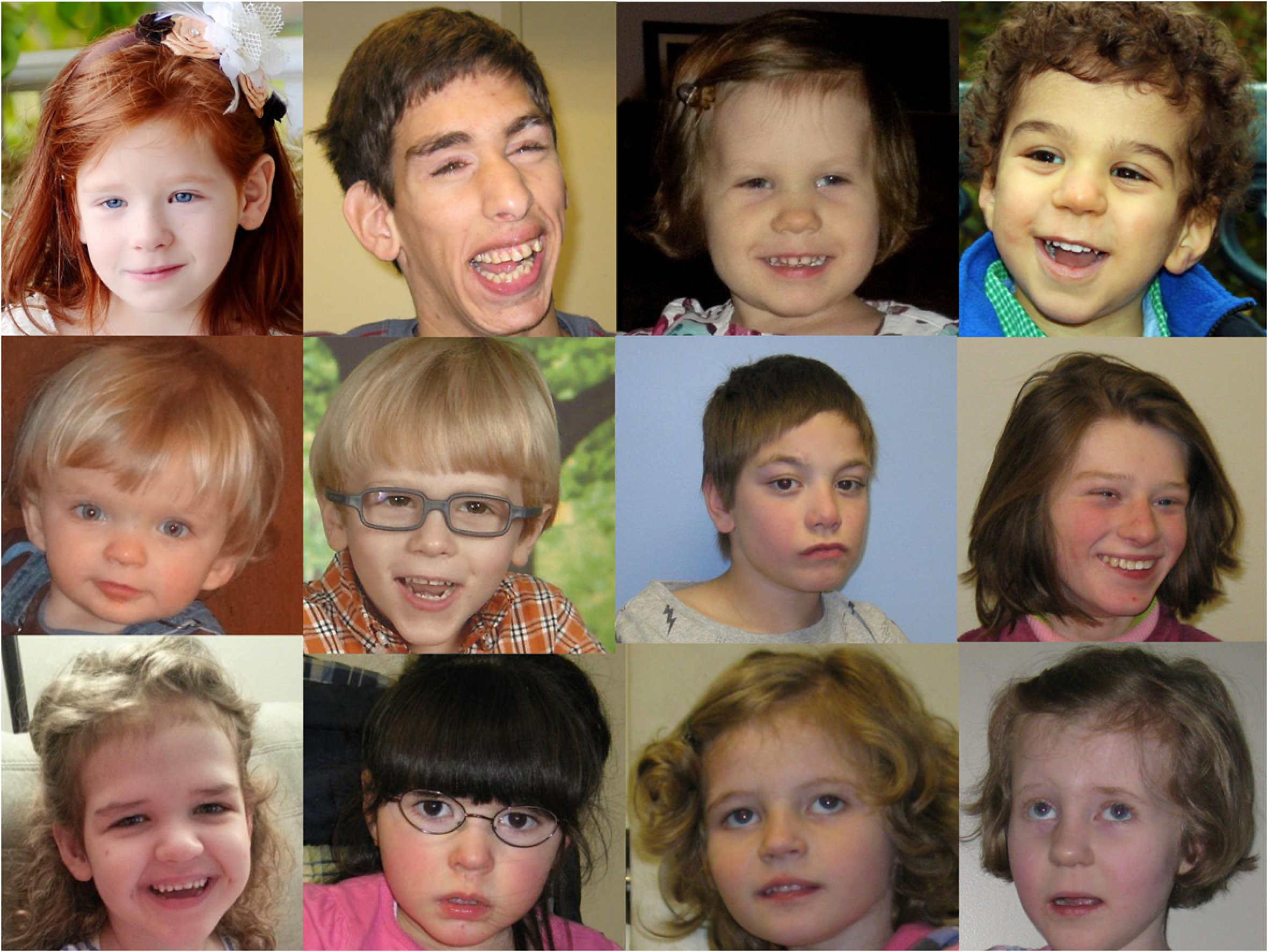
- Photos of people with PMS who have typical facial features of the syndrome, namely long eyelashes, pointed chin, and a bulbous nose
- Specialty: Genetics

22q13 deletion syndrome, known as Phelan–McDermid syndrome (PMS), is a genetic disorder caused by deletions or rearrangements on the q terminal end (long arm) of chromosome 22. Any abnormal genetic variation in the q13 region that presents with significant manifestations (phenotype) typical of a terminal deletion may be diagnosed as 22q13 deletion syndrome. There is disagreement among researchers as to the exact definition of 22q13 deletion syndrome. The Developmental Synaptopathies Consortium defines PMS as being caused by SHANK3 mutations, a definition that appears to exclude terminal deletions. The requirement to include SHANK3 in the definition is supported by many but not by those who first described 22q13 deletion syndrome.

Prototypical terminal deletion of 22q13 can be uncovered by karyotype analysis, but many terminal and interstitial deletions are too small. The availability of DNA microarray technology for revealing multiple genetic problems simultaneously has been the diagnostic tool of choice. The falling cost for the whole exome sequencing and, eventually, whole genome sequencing may replace DNA microarray technology for candidate evaluation. However, fluorescence in situ hybridization (FISH) tests remain valuable for diagnosing cases of mosaicism (mosaic genetics) and chromosomal rearrangements (e.g., ring chromosome, unbalanced chromosomal translocation). Although early researchers sought a monogenic (single gene genetic disorder) explanation, recent studies have not supported that hypothesis (see Etiology).

== Signs and symptoms ==
Affected individuals present with a broad array of medical and behavioral manifestations (tables 1 and 2). Patients are consistently characterized by global developmental delay, intellectual disability, speech abnormalities, Autism Spectrum Disorder (ASD)-like behaviors, hypotonia and mild dysmorphic features. Table 1 summarizes the dysmorphic and medical conditions that have been reported in individuals with PMS. Table 2 summarizes the psychiatric and neurological symptoms associated with PMS. Most of the studies include small samples or rely on parental reports or medical record reviews to collect information, which can account in part for the variability in the presentation of some of the presenting features. Larger prospective studies are needed to further characterize the phenotype.

Table 1: dysmorphic features and medical comorbid conditions that have been reported in individuals with Phelan–McDermid syndrome
Dysmorphic feature	Percentage (%)	Medical comorbidities	Percentage (%)
Macrocephaly	7–31	Hypothyroidism	3–6
Microcephaly	11–14	Sleep disturbance	41–46
Dolichocephaly	23–86	Gastroesophageal reflux	42–44
Long eyelashes	43–93	Increased pain threshold	10–88
Bulbous nose	47–80	Constipation/diarrhea	38–41
High-arched palate	25–47	Brain imaging abnormalities	7–75
Malocclusion/widely spaced teeth	19	Recurrent upper respiratory infections	8–53
Full cheeks	25	Renal abnormalities	17–26
Pointed chin	22–62	Lymphedema	8–53
Large fleshy hands	33–68	Seizures	14–41
Hypoplastic/dysplastic nails	3–78	Strabismus	6–26
Hyper-extensibility	25–61	Short stature	11–13
Abnormal spine curvature	22	Tall stature/accelerated growth	3–18
Sacral dimple	13–37	Cardiac defects	3–25
Syndactyly of toes 2 and 3	48	Precocious or delayed puberty	12

Table 2: psychiatric and neurologic manifestations associated with Phelan–McDermid syndrome
Psychiatric and neurologic manifestations	Percentage (%)
Autism spectrum disorder	>25
Intellectual disability	~100
Global developmental delay	~100
Absent or severely affected speech	>75
Sensory seeking behaviors (mouthing of objects)	>25
Teeth grinding	>25
Hyperactivity and inattention	>50
Stereotypical movements	>50
Hypotonia	>50
Fine and gross motor abnormalities	>90
Poor fine motor coordination	>90
Gait abnormalities	>90
Visual tracking abnormalities	>85
Seizure disorder	17–41
Brain structural abnormalities	44–100
Sleep problems	>40

== Cause ==
Various deletions affect the terminal region of the long arm of chromosome 22 (the paternal chromosome in 75% of cases,) from 22q13.3 to 22qter. Although the deletion is most typically a result of a de novo mutation, there is an inherited form resulting from familial chromosomal translocations involving the 22 chromosomes. In the de novo form, the size of the terminal deletion is variable and can go from 130 Kb (130,000 base pairs) to 9 Mb. Deletions smaller than 1 Mb are very rare (about 3%). The remaining 97% of terminal deletions impact about 30 to 190 genes (see list, below). At one time it was thought that deletion size was not related to the core clinical features. That observation led to an emphasis on the SHANK3 gene, which resides close to the terminal end of chromosome 22. Interest in SHANK3 grew as it became associated with autism spectrum disorder (ASD) and schizophrenia. Since then, twelve other genes on 22q13 (MAPK8IP2, CHKB, SCO2, SBF1, PLXNB2, MAPK12, PANX2, BRD1, CELSR1, WNT7B, TCF20) have been associated with autism spectrum disorder and/or schizophrenia (see references below). Some mutations of SHANK3 mimic 22q13 deletion syndrome, but SHANK3 mutations and microdeletions have quite variable impact.

Some of the core features of 22q13 deletion syndrome are dependent upon deletion size, and do not depend on the loss of SHANK3. As noted above, the distal 1 Mb of 22q is a gene rich region. There are too few clinical cases to statistically measure the relationship between deletion size and phenotype in this region. SHANK3 is also adjacent to a gene cluster (ARSA and MAPK8IP2) that has a high probability of contributing to ASD, suggesting the effects of SHANK3 deletion may be indistinguishable from other genetic losses. A landmark study of induced pluripotent stem cell neurons cultured from patients with 22q13 deletion syndrome shows that restoration of the SHANK3 protein produces a significant but incomplete rescue of membrane receptors, supporting both a substantial role for SHANK3 and an additional role for other genes in the distal 1 Mb of chromosome 22.

There is an interest in the impact of MAPK8IP2 (also called IB2) in 22q13 deletion syndrome. MAPK8IP2 is especially interesting because it regulates the balance between NMDA receptors and AMPA receptors. The genes SULT4A1 and PARVB may cause 22q13 deletion syndrome in cases of more proximal interstitial and large terminal deletions. There are about 187 protein-coding genes in the 22q13 region. A group of genes (MPPED1, CYB5R3, FBLN1, NUP50, C22ORF9, KIAA1644, PARVB, TRMU, WNT7B and ATXN10), as well as microRNAs may all contribute to loss of language, a feature that varies notably with deletion size. The same study found that macrocephaly seen in 22q13 deletion syndrome patients may be associated with WNT7B. FBLN1 is responsible for synpolydactyly as well as its contribution to the neurological manifestations (OMIM 608180).

RABL2B	ACR	SHANK3	ARSA	MAPK8IP2	CHKB	CPT1B	SYCE3	KLHDC7B	ODF3B	TYMP	SCO2
NCAPH2	LMF2	MIOX	ADM2	SBF1	PPP6R2	DENND6B	PLXNB2	MAPK11	MAPK12	HDAC10	TUBGCP6
SELO	TRABD	PANX2	MOV10L1	MLC1	IL17REL	PIM3	CRELD2	ALG12	ZBED4	BRD1	FAM19A5
FLJ32756	TBC1D22A	CERK	GRAMD4	CELSR1	TRMU	BC069212	GTSE1	TTC38	PKDREJ	CDPF1	PPARA
WNT7B	ATXN10	FBLN1	RIBC2	SMC1B	FAM118A	UPK3A	KIAA0930	NUP50	PHF21B	PRR5-ARHGAP8	LDOC1L
KIAA1644	PARVG	TRNA_SeC	PARVB	SAMM50	PNPLA3	PNPLA5	SULT4A1	EFCAB6	MPPED1	SCUBE1	TTLL12
TSPO	MCAT	BIK	TTLL1	PACSIN2	ARFGAP3	A4GALT	ATP5L2	DL490307	CYB5R3	RNU12	POLDIP3
SERHL2	RRP7A	NFAM1	TCF20	CYP2D6	NDUFA6	SMDT1	FAM109B	NAGA	WBP2NL	CENPM	TNFRSF13C
SHISA8	SREBF2	CCDC134	MEI1	C22orf46	NHP2L1	XRCC6	DESI1	PMM1	CSDC2	POLR3H	ACO2
PHF5A	TOB2	TEF	ZC3H7B	RANGAP1	CHADL	L3MBTL2	EP300	RBX1	DNAJB7	XPNPEP3	ST13
SLC25A17	MCHR1	MKL1	SGSM3	ADSL	TNRC6B	FAM83F	GRAP2	ENTHD1	CACNA1I	RPS19BP1	ATF4
SMCR7L	MGAT3	TAB1	SNORD43	RPL3	PDGFB	CBX7	APOBEC3H	APOBEC3F	APOBEC3D	APOBEC3C	APOBEC3B
CBX6	NPTXR	DNAL4	SUN2	GTPBP1	JOSD1	TOMM22	CBY1	FAM227A	DMC1	DDX17	KDELR3
KCNJ4	CSNK1E	TMEM184B	MAFF	MAFF	PLA2G6	BAIAP2L2	SLC16A8	PICK1	SOX10	POLR2F	C22orf23
MICALL1	EIF3L	ANKRD54	GALR3	GCAT	H1F0	TRIOBP	NOL12	LGALS1	SH3BP1	GGA1	LGALS2
CDC42EP1	CARD10	MFNG	ELFN2	CYTH4							

Table of protein-coding genes involved in 22q13 deletion syndrome (based on Human Genome Browser – hg38 assembly). Underline identifies 13 genes that are associated with autism. Bold identifies genes associated with hypotonia (based on Human Phenotype Browser search for 'hypotonia' and the OMIM database).

== Diagnosis and management ==
=== Clinical genetics and genetic testing ===
Genetic testing is necessary to confirm the diagnosis of PMS. A prototypical terminal deletion of 22q13 can be uncovered by karyotype analysis, but many terminal and interstitial deletions are too small to detect with this method. Chromosomal microarray should be ordered in children with suspected developmental delays or ASD. Most cases will be identified by microarray; however, small variations in genes might be missed. The falling cost for whole exome sequencing may replace DNA microarray technology for candidate gene evaluation. Biological parents should be tested with fluorescence in situ hybridization (FISH) to rule out balanced translocations or inversions. Balanced translocation in a parent increases the risk for recurrence and heritability within families (figure 3).

Clinical genetic evaluations and dysmorphology exams should be done to evaluate growth, pubertal development, and dysmorphic features (table 1) and screen for organ defects (table 2)

=== Cognitive and behavioral assessment ===
All patients should undergo comprehensive developmental, cognitive and behavioral assessments by clinicians with experience in developmental disorders. Cognitive evaluation should be tailored for individuals with significant language and developmental delays. All patients should be referred for specialized speech/language and occupational and physical therapy evaluations.

=== Neurological management ===
Individuals with PMS should be followed by a pediatric neurologist regularly to monitor motor development, coordination, and gait, as well as conditions that might be associated with hypotonia. Head circumference should be performed routinely up until 36 months. Given the high rate of seizure disorders (up to 41% of patients) reported in the literature in patients with PMS and its overall negative impact on development, an overnight video EEG should be considered early to rule out seizure activity. In addition, a baseline structural brain MRI should be considered to rule out the presence of structural abnormalities.

=== Nephrology ===
All patients should have a baseline renal and bladder ultrasonography, and a voiding cystourethrogram should be considered to rule out structural and functional abnormalities. Renal abnormalities are reported in up to 38% of patients with PMS. Vesicoureteral reflux, hydronephrosis, renal agenesis, dysplastic kidney, polycystic kidney, and recurrent urinary tract infections have all been reported in patients with PMS.

=== Cardiology ===
Congenital heart defects (CHD) are reported in samples of children with PMS with varying frequency (up to 25%)(29,36). The most common CHD include tricuspid valve regurgitation, atrial septal defects and patent ductus arteriosus. Cardiac evaluation, including echocardiography and electrocardiogram, should be considered.

=== Gastroenterology ===
Gastrointestinal symptoms are common in individuals with PMS. Gastroesophageal reflux, constipation, diarrhea and cyclic vomiting are frequently described.

Table 3: Clinical Assessment Recommendations in Phelan–McDermid Syndrome

Medical Specialty	Assessment Recommended
Primary Care/Development Pediatrics	Careful and routine monitoring
Primary Care/Development Pediatrics	Hearing Assessment
Primary Care/Development Pediatrics	Visual Assessment
Primary Care/Development Pediatrics	Monitoring of height, weight, and BMI
Primary Care/Development Pediatrics	Otolaryngology (ENT)
Primary Care/Development Pediatrics	Pediatric dentistry
Primary Care/Development Pediatrics	Physiatrist/physical therapy
Psychiatric and Psychology	Psychiatric evaluation with a focus on autism spectrum disorder
Psychiatric and Psychology	Autism Diagnostic Observation Schedule (ADOS)
Psychiatric and Psychology	Cognitive or Developmental Assessment
Psychiatric and Psychology	Speech and Language Evaluation/Therapy
Psychiatric and Psychology	Adaptive Function Testing
Psychiatric and Psychology	Educational Assessment
Psychiatric and Psychology	Occupational Therapy
Neurology	motor development, coordination, and gait monitoring, as well as conditions that might be associated with hypotonia, like neuromuscular scoliosis and feeding problems
Neurology	Overnight video EEG
Neurology	Structural brain MRI
Neurology	Head circumference up to 36 months
Nephrology	Renal and bladder ultrasonography
Cardiology	Echocardiogram
Cardiology	Electrocardiogram
Endocrinology	Thyroid function
Endocrinology	Nutritional assessment

== Epidemiology ==
The true prevalence of PMS has not been determined. More than 1,200 people have been identified worldwide according to the Phelan–McDermid Syndrome Foundation The Cleveland Clinc records about 2,200-2,500 people, as well as it occurring in 2 to 10 of every 1 million live births. However, it is believed to be underdiagnosed due to inadequate genetic testing and lack of specific clinical features. It is known to occur with equal frequency in males and females. Studies using chromosomal microarray for diagnosis indicate that at least 0.5% of cases of ASD can be explained by mutations or deletions in the SHANK3 gene. In addition, when ASD is associated with ID, SHANK3 mutations or deletions have been found in up to 2% of individuals.

== History ==
The first case of PMS was described in 1985 by Watt et al., who described a 14-year-old boy with severe intellectual disability, mild dysmorphic features and absent speech, which was associated with terminal loss of the distal arm of chromosome 22. In 1988, Phelan et al. described a similar clinical presentation associated with a de novo deletion in 22q13.3. Subsequent cases were described in the following years with a similar clinical presentation. Phelan et al. (2001), compared 37 subjects with 22q13 deletions with features of 24 cases described in the literature finding that the most common features were global developmental delay, absent or delayed speech and hypotonia. In 2001, Bonaglia et al., described a case that associated the 22q.13 deletion syndrome with a disruption of the SHANK3 gene (also called ProSAP2). The following year, Anderlid et al. (2002), refined the area in 22q13 presumably responsible for the common phenotypic presentation of the syndrome to a 100kb in 22q13.3. Out of the three genes affected, SHANK3 was identified as the critical gene due to its expression pattern and function. Wilson et al. (2003) evaluated 56 patients with the clinical presentation of PMS, all of whom had a functional loss of one copy of the SHANK3 gene. However, later the same group demonstrated that loss of SHANK3 gene was not an essential requirement for the disorder.

== See also ==
- List of syndromes
- Toxidrome
- Symptom
- Sequence (medicine)
- Characteristics of syndromic ASD conditions
