= SNX27 =

Protein-coding gene in humans

Identifiers
- Aliases: SNX27, MRT1, MY014, sorting nexin family member 27, sorting nexin 27
- External IDs: OMIM: 611541; MGI: 1923992; GeneCards: SNX27
Available structures
PDB	Ortholog search: PDBe RCSB
PDB	List of PDB id codes 4HAS

Gene location (Human)
Chr.	Chromosome 1 (human)
Band	1q21.3	Start	151,612,006 bp
Band	1q21.3	End	151,699,091 bp

Gene location (Mouse)
Chr.	Chromosome 3 (mouse)
Band	3|3 F2.1	Start	94,404,851 bp
Band	3|3 F2.1	End	94,490,023 bp
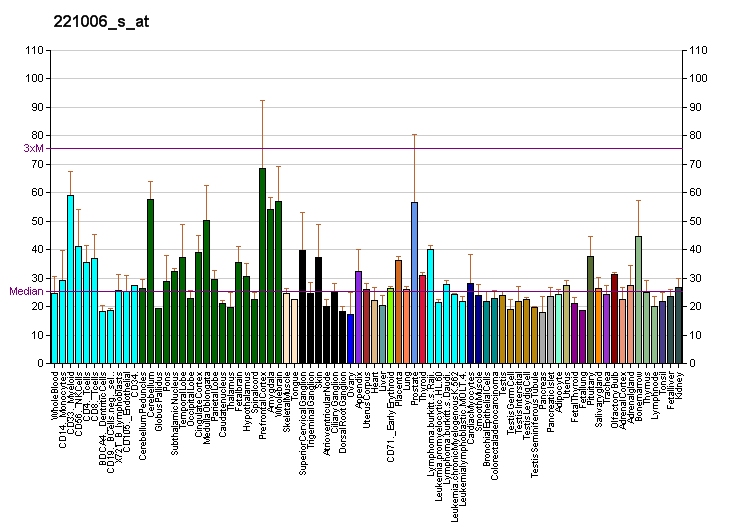
RNA expression pattern
Bgee	Human / Mouse (ortholog); Top expressed in: internal globus pallidus; optic nerve; external globus pallidus; superior vestibular nucleus; inferior ganglion of vagus nerve; lateral nuclear group of thalamus; ventral tegmental area; subthalamic nucleus; monocyte; pars compacta / Top expressed in: otic vesicle; tail of embryo; otolith organ; utricle; Rostral migratory stream; ventromedial nucleus; lateral septal nucleus; dentate gyrus of hippocampal formation granule cell; hand; spermatocyte; More reference expression data
BioGPS	More reference expression data
Gene ontology
Molecular function	phosphatidylinositol-3-phosphate binding; protein binding; phosphatidylinositol binding; lipid binding
Cellular component	early endosome membrane; membrane; nucleoplasm; retromer complex; early endosome; immunological synapse; WASH complex; cytoplasm; endosome; cytosol
Biological process	establishment of natural killer cell polarity; endosome to lysosome transport; endosomal transport; protein transport; intracellular protein transport; signal transduction
Sources:Amigo / QuickGO
Orthologs
Databases	NCBI: entry; OMA: entry
Species	Human	Mouse
Entrez	81609	76742
Ensembl	ENSG00000143376	ENSMUSG00000028136
UniProt	Q96L92	Q3UHD6
RefSeq (mRNA)	NM_030918; NM_001330723	NM_001082484; NM_029721
RefSeq (protein)	NP_001317652; NP_112180	NP_001075953; NP_083997
Location (UCSC)	Chr 1: 151.61 – 151.7 Mb	Chr 3: 94.4 – 94.49 Mb
PubMed search
- Wikidata
View/Edit Human	View/Edit Mouse

Sorting nexin family member 27, also known as SNX27, is a human gene.

This gene encodes a member of the sorting nexin family, a diverse group of cytoplasmic and membrane-associated proteins involved in endocytosis of plasma membrane receptors and protein trafficking through these compartments. All members of this protein family contain a phosphoinositide binding domain (PX domain). A highly similar protein in mice is responsible for the specific recruitment of an isoform of the serotonin 5-hydroxytryptamine 4 receptor into early endosomes, suggesting the analogous role for the human protein.
