= SHANK2 =

Protein-coding gene in the species Homo sapiens

Identifiers
- Aliases: SHANK2, AUTS17, CORTBP1, CTTNBP1, ProSAP1, SHANK, SPANK-3, SH3 and multiple ankyrin repeat domains 2
- External IDs: OMIM: 603290; MGI: 2671987; GeneCards: SHANK2

Gene location (Human)
Chr.	Chromosome 11 (human)
Band	11q13.3-q13.4	Start	70,467,854 bp
Band	11q13.3-q13.4	End	71,252,577 bp

Gene location (Mouse)
Chr.	Chromosome 7 (mouse)
Band	7|7 F5	Start	143,555,665 bp
Band	7|7 F5	End	143,978,231 bp
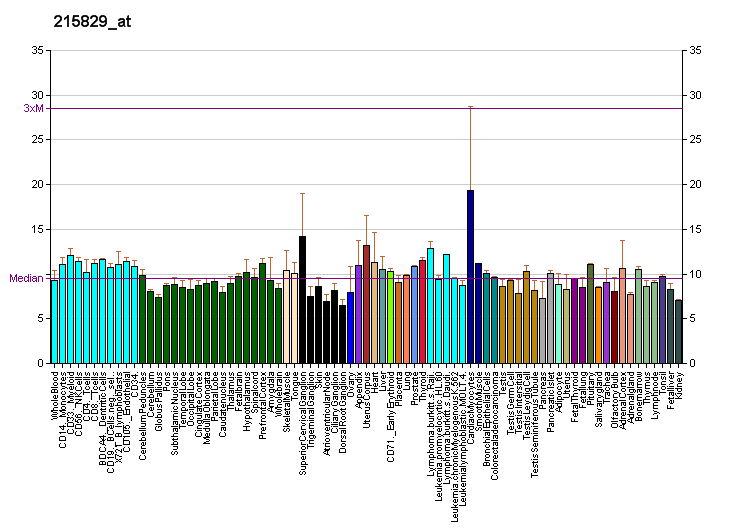

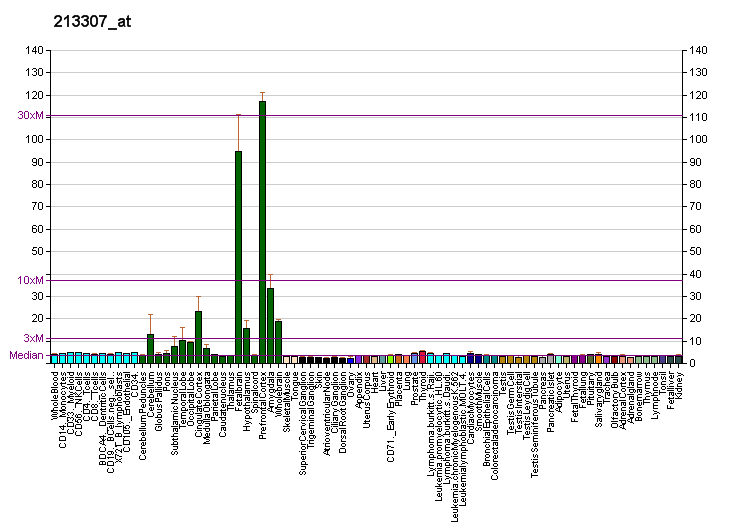

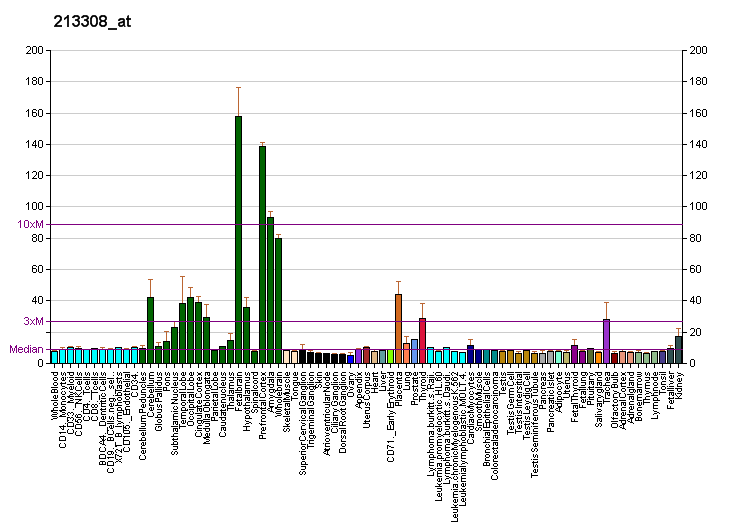
RNA expression pattern
Bgee	Human / Mouse (ortholog); Top expressed in: Brodmann area 23; bronchial epithelial cell; middle temporal gyrus; Region I of hippocampus proper; entorhinal cortex; corpus epididymis; Epithelium of choroid plexus; endothelial cell; retinal pigment epithelium; primary visual cortex / Top expressed in: primary visual cortex; superior frontal gyrus; dentate gyrus of hippocampal formation granule cell; otolith organ; utricle; cerebellar cortex; lobe of cerebellum; zygote; substantia nigra; neural layer of retina; More reference expression data
BioGPS	More reference expression data
Gene ontology
Molecular function	SH3 domain binding; protein binding; synaptic receptor adaptor activity; ionotropic glutamate receptor binding; signaling receptor complex adaptor activity
Cellular component	cytoplasm; postsynaptic membrane; cell projection; membrane; postsynaptic density; neurofilament; photoreceptor inner segment; growth cone; plasma membrane; dendritic spine; photoreceptor outer segment; synapse; brush border membrane; cell junction; soma; apical plasma membrane; ciliary membrane; neuron projection; ionotropic glutamate receptor complex; cytosol; cellular component; dendrite; neuron spine
Biological process	learning; vocalization behavior; adult behavior; long-term depression; social behavior; synapse assembly; long-term potentiation; brain morphogenesis; synaptic assembly at neuromuscular junction; positive regulation of synaptic transmission, glutamatergic; dendritic spine morphogenesis; positive regulation of dendritic spine development; postsynaptic density assembly; regulation of AMPA receptor activity; positive regulation of excitatory postsynaptic potential
Sources:Amigo / QuickGO
Orthologs
Databases	NCBI: entry; OMA: entry
Species	Human	Mouse
Entrez	22941	210274
Ensembl	ENSG00000162105	ENSMUSG00000037541
UniProt	Q9UPX8	Q80Z38
RefSeq (mRNA)	NM_012309; NM_133266; NM_001379226	NM_001081370; NM_001113373
RefSeq (protein)	NP_036441; NP_573573; NP_001366155	NP_001074839; NP_001106844
Location (UCSC)	Chr 11: 70.47 – 71.25 Mb	Chr 7: 143.56 – 143.98 Mb
PubMed search
- Wikidata
View/Edit Human	View/Edit Mouse

SH3 and multiple ankyrin repeat domains protein 2 is a protein that in humans is encoded by the SHANK2 gene. Two alternative splice variants, encoding distinct isoforms, are reported. Additional splice variants exist but their full-length nature has not been determined.

== Function ==
This gene encodes a protein that is a member of the Shank family of synaptic proteins that may function as molecular scaffolds in the postsynaptic density (PSD). Shank proteins contain multiple domains for protein-protein interaction, including ankyrin repeats, an SH3 domain, a PSD-95/Dlg/ZO-1 domain, a sterile alpha motif domain, and a proline-rich region. This particular family member contains a PDZ domain, a consensus sequence for cortactin SH3 domain-binding peptides and a sterile alpha motif. The alternative splicing demonstrated in Shank genes has been suggested as a mechanism for regulating the molecular structure of Shank and the spectrum of Shank-interacting proteins in the PSDs of adult and developing brain.

It is thought that SHANK2 might play a role in synaptogenesis by attaching metabotropic glutamate receptors (mGluRs) to an existing pool of NMDA receptors (NMDA-R), bylinking to the NMDA-R through PSD-95, and the mGluRs through HOMER1. An alternative hypothesis is that the Homer/Shank/GKAP/PSD-95 assembly mediates physical association of the NMDAR with IP3R/RYR and intracellular Ca2+ stores.

== Interactions ==
SHANK2 has been shown to interact with:

- ARHGEF7,
- Cortactin,
- DLG4,
- DLGAP1, and
- DNM2.

== Associations with neuropsychiatric disease ==
Mutations in SHANK2 have been associated with autism spectrum disorder (ASD) and schizophrenia. In particular, heterozygous loss-of-function mutations have a near-complete penetrance in ASD. Neurons generated from people with ASD and SHANK2 mutations develop larger dendritic trees and more synaptic connections than those from healthy controls. In addition, common mutations in SHANK2 have been linked to bipolar disorder.
