= GIT1 =

Protein-coding gene in humans

Identifiers
- Aliases: GIT1, GIT ArfGAP 1, p95-APP1
- External IDs: OMIM: 608434; MGI: 1927140; GeneCards: GIT1

Gene location (Human)
Chr.	Chromosome 17 (human)
Band	17q11.2	Start	29,573,475 bp
Band	17q11.2	End	29,594,054 bp

Gene location (Mouse)
Chr.	Chromosome 11 (mouse)
Band	11|11 B5	Start	77,384,388 bp
Band	11|11 B5	End	77,398,612 bp
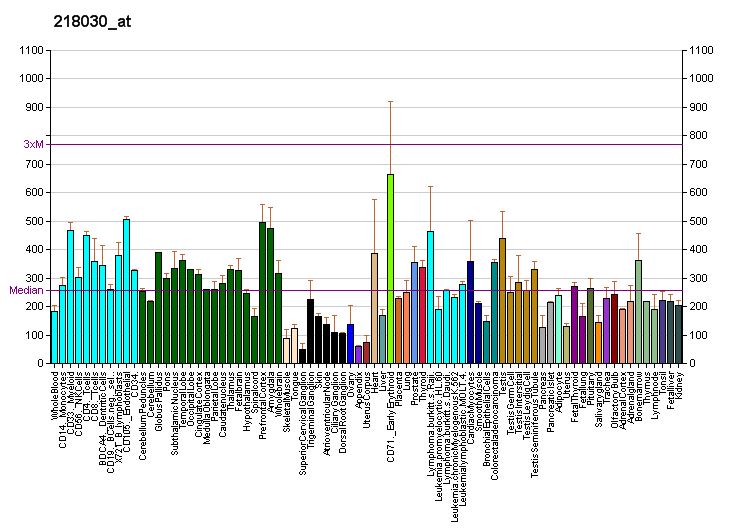
RNA expression pattern
Bgee	Human / Mouse (ortholog); Top expressed in: right frontal lobe; cingulate gyrus; anterior cingulate cortex; olfactory bulb; left testis; amygdala; prefrontal cortex; cerebellar vermis; putamen; right testis / Top expressed in: superior frontal gyrus; primary visual cortex; perirhinal cortex; entorhinal cortex; dentate gyrus of hippocampal formation granule cell; CA3 field; ankle joint; seminiferous tubule; spermatid; hippocampus proper; More reference expression data
BioGPS	More reference expression data
Gene ontology
Molecular function	protein-containing complex binding; protein binding; metal ion binding; GTPase activator activity
Cellular component	membrane; focal adhesion; cytoplasm; cytosol; calyx of Held
Biological process	ephrin receptor signaling pathway; positive regulation of GTPase activity; regulation of cytokinesis; regulation of G protein-coupled receptor signaling pathway; presynaptic modulation of chemical synaptic transmission; regulation of synaptic vesicle exocytosis
Sources:Amigo / QuickGO
Orthologs
Databases	NCBI: entry; OMA: entry
Species	Human	Mouse
Entrez	28964	216963
Ensembl	ENSG00000108262	ENSMUSG00000011877
UniProt	Q9Y2X7	Q68FF6
RefSeq (mRNA)	NM_001085454; NM_014030	NM_001004144; NM_001374758
RefSeq (protein)	NP_001078923; NP_054749	NP_001004144; NP_001361687
Location (UCSC)	Chr 17: 29.57 – 29.59 Mb	Chr 11: 77.38 – 77.4 Mb
PubMed search
- Wikidata
View/Edit Human	View/Edit Mouse

ARF GTPase-activating protein GIT1 is an enzyme that in humans is encoded by the GIT1 gene.

GIT1 contains an ARFGAP domain, Anykrin repeats, and a GRK-interacting domain. The Arf-GAP domain, which enables it to act as a GTPase activating protein (GAP) for the Arf family of GTPases, has been shown to be involved in phosphorylation and inhibition of the ADRB2. If synaptic localization of GIT1 is disturbed, then this is known to affect dendritic spine morphology and formation—this is thought to occur through the Rac1/PAK1/LIMK/CFL1 pathway.

== Interactions ==
GIT1 has been shown to interact with:

- ARHGEF7,
- Beta adrenergic receptor kinase,
- GIT2,
- PCLO,
- PLCG1,
- PPFIA4
- PTK2, and
- liprin-alpha-1.
