= P21-activated kinases =

p21 activated kinases (PAKs) are members of a family of enzymes. They serve as targets for the small GTP binding proteins CDC42 and Rac and have been implicated in a wide range of biological activities.

Members include:

- PAK1, regulating cell motility and morphology
- PAK2, possibly playing a role in apoptosis
- PAK3, possibly for dendritic development and for the rapid cytoskeletal reorganization in dendritic spines associated with synaptic plasticity
- PAK4, a mediator of filopodia formation
- PAK5, a mediator of filopodia formation
- PAK6, involved in cytoskeleton rearrangement
