= SHANK3 =

Protein-coding gene in humans

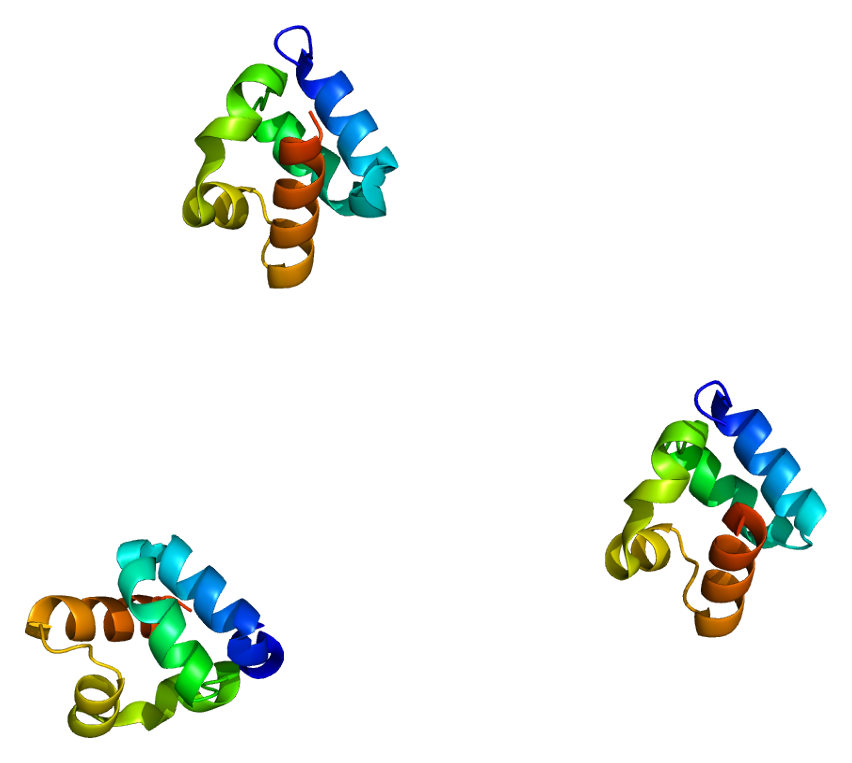

Identifiers
- Aliases: SHANK3, DEL22q13.3, PROSAP2, PSAP2, SCZD15, SPANK-2, SH3 and multiple ankyrin repeat domains 3
- External IDs: OMIM: 606230; MGI: 1930016; GeneCards: SHANK3

Gene location (Human)
Chr.	Chromosome 22 (human)
Band	22q13.33	Start	50,674,415 bp
Band	22q13.33	End	50,733,212 bp

Gene location (Mouse)
Chr.	Chromosome 15 (mouse)
Band	15|15 E3	Start	89,383,826 bp
Band	15|15 E3	End	89,444,464 bp
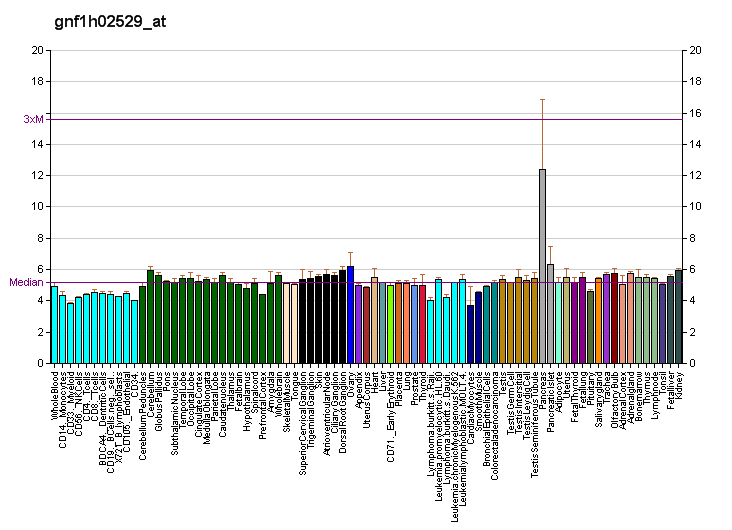

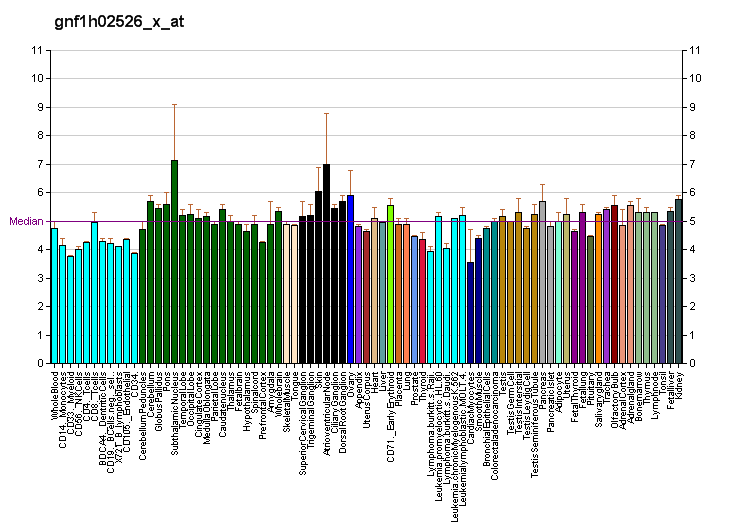

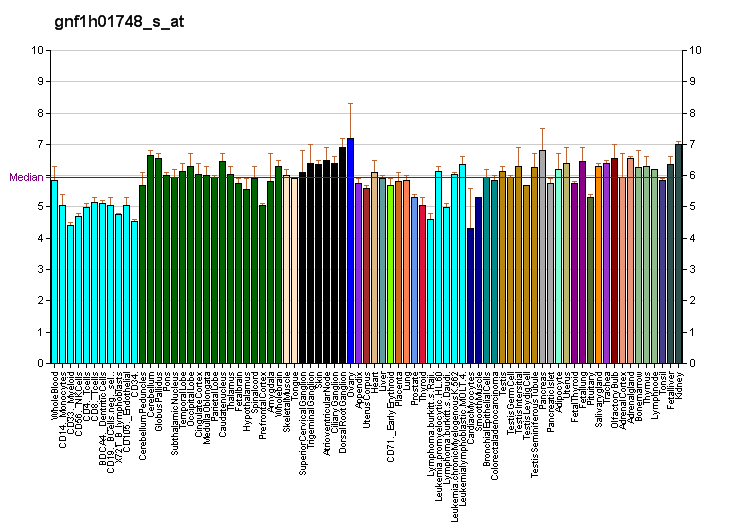
RNA expression pattern
Bgee	Human / Mouse (ortholog); Top expressed in: right hemisphere of cerebellum; cerebellar vermis; lateral nuclear group of thalamus; spleen; cardiac muscle tissue of right atrium; apex of heart; entorhinal cortex; postcentral gyrus; sural nerve; myocardium of left ventricle / Top expressed in: medial dorsal nucleus; dentate gyrus of hippocampal formation granule cell; medial geniculate nucleus; olfactory tubercle; cerebellar cortex; superior frontal gyrus; primary visual cortex; lobe of cerebellum; lateral geniculate nucleus; cerebellar vermis; More reference expression data
BioGPS	More reference expression data
Gene ontology
Molecular function	SH3 domain binding; scaffold protein binding; zinc ion binding; protein C-terminus binding; protein binding; synaptic receptor adaptor activity; actin binding; ionotropic glutamate receptor binding; protein self-association; signaling receptor complex adaptor activity
Cellular component	cytoplasm; postsynaptic membrane; cell projection; membrane; plasma membrane; dendritic spine; synapse; cell junction; ciliary membrane; neuron spine; neuron projection; postsynaptic density; cytosol; extrinsic component of cytoplasmic side of plasma membrane; ionotropic glutamate receptor complex; dendrite
Biological process	positive regulation of long-term synaptic potentiation; positive regulation of synapse structural plasticity; NMDA glutamate receptor clustering; regulation of long-term synaptic depression; positive regulation of glutamate receptor signaling pathway; postsynaptic density assembly; negative regulation of actin filament bundle assembly; negative regulation of cell volume; positive regulation of AMPA receptor activity; memory; learning; positive regulation of dendritic spine development; MAPK cascade; striatal medium spiny neuron differentiation; AMPA glutamate receptor clustering; dendritic spine morphogenesis; vocal learning; vocalization behavior; adult behavior; positive regulation of synaptic transmission, glutamatergic; positive regulation of long-term neuronal synaptic plasticity; regulation of long-term synaptic potentiation; positive regulation of excitatory postsynaptic potential; social behavior; guanylate kinase-associated protein clustering; synapse assembly; regulation of dendritic spine morphogenesis; brain morphogenesis; axon guidance; synaptic assembly at neuromuscular junction; long-term potentiation; regulation of AMPA receptor activity
Sources:Amigo / QuickGO
Orthologs
Databases	NCBI: entry; OMA: entry
Species	Human	Mouse
Entrez	85358	58234
Ensembl	ENSG00000251322	ENSMUSG00000022623
UniProt	Q9BYB0	Q4ACU6
RefSeq (mRNA)	NM_001080420; NM_001372044	NM_021423
RefSeq (protein)	NP_277052	NP_067398
Location (UCSC)	Chr 22: 50.67 – 50.73 Mb	Chr 15: 89.38 – 89.44 Mb
PubMed search
- Wikidata
View/Edit Human	View/Edit Mouse

SH3 and multiple ankyrin repeat domains 3 (Shank3), also known as proline-rich synapse-associated protein 2 (ProSAP2), is a protein that in humans is encoded by the SHANK3 gene on chromosome 22. Additional isoforms have been described for this gene but they have not yet been experimentally verified.

== Function ==
This gene is one of the 3-member Shank gene family (Shank1-3). The gene encodes a protein that contains 5 interaction domains or motifs including the ankyrin repeats domain (ANK), a src 3 domain (SH3), a proline-rich domain, a PDZ domain and a sterile α motif domain (SAM). Shank proteins are multidomain scaffold proteins of the postsynaptic density that connect neurotransmitter receptors, ion channels, and other membrane proteins to the actin cytoskeleton and G-protein-coupled signaling pathways. Shank proteins also play a role in synapse formation and dendritic spine maturation.

== Clinical significance ==
Mutations in this gene are associated with autism spectrum disorder. This gene is often missing in patients with 22q13.3 deletion syndrome (Phelan–McDermid syndrome), although not in all cases.

== Interactions ==
SHANK3 has been shown to interact with ARHGEF7.

== Mouse models ==
Mouse models of SHANK3 include N-terminal knock-outs and a PDZ domain knock-out all of which also show social interaction deficits and variable other phenotypes. Most of these mice are homozygous knock-outs whereas all the human SHANK3 mutations have been heterozygous.

In an inducible knockout, restoration of SHANK3 expression in adult mice promoted dendritic spine growth and recovered normal grooming behaviour and voluntary social interaction. However, the reduced locomotion, anxiety and rotarod deficits remained. Germline restoration of the gene's expression rescued all measured phenotypes. Experiments on different developmental windows suggested that early intervention was more effective in restoring behavioural traits.

== Rat models ==
A rat model of SHANK3 was developed using zinc finger nucleases targeting exon 6 of the ankyrin (ANK) repeat domain. The deletion (-68bp) resulted in reduction of the full length SHANK3a protein. It is unclear if the expression of other isoforms (b and c) of SHANK3 is affected in this rodent model. The shank3 mutant rats have deficits in long-term social recognition memory but not short-term social recognition memory as well as deficits in attention. These are symptons of impaired synaptic plasticity. In humans, 5 patients have been described harboring varying mutations in exon 6 of the SHANK3 protein.
