= GIT2 =

Protein-coding gene in humans

Identifiers
- Aliases: GIT2, CAT-2, CAT2, PKL, GIT ArfGAP 2
- External IDs: OMIM: 608564; MGI: 1347053; GeneCards: GIT2

Gene location (Human)
Chr.	Chromosome 12 (human)
Band	12q24.11	Start	109,929,804 bp
Band	12q24.11	End	109,996,389 bp

Gene location (Mouse)
Chr.	Chromosome 5 (mouse)
Band	5|5 F	Start	114,727,407 bp
Band	5|5 F	End	114,775,517 bp
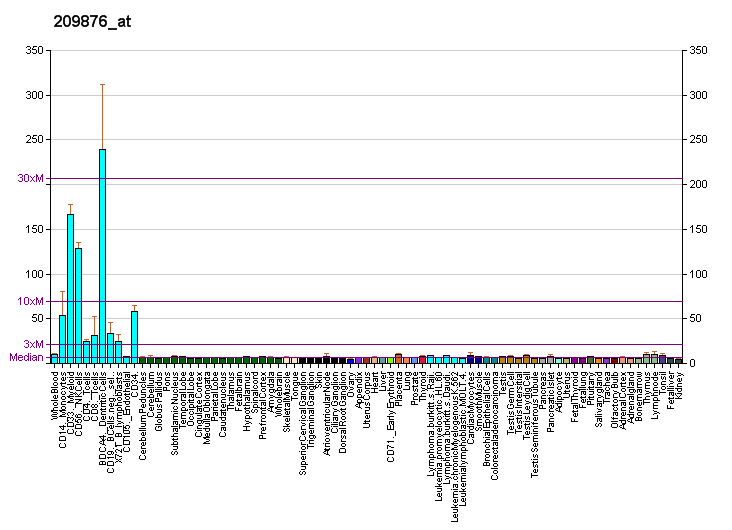

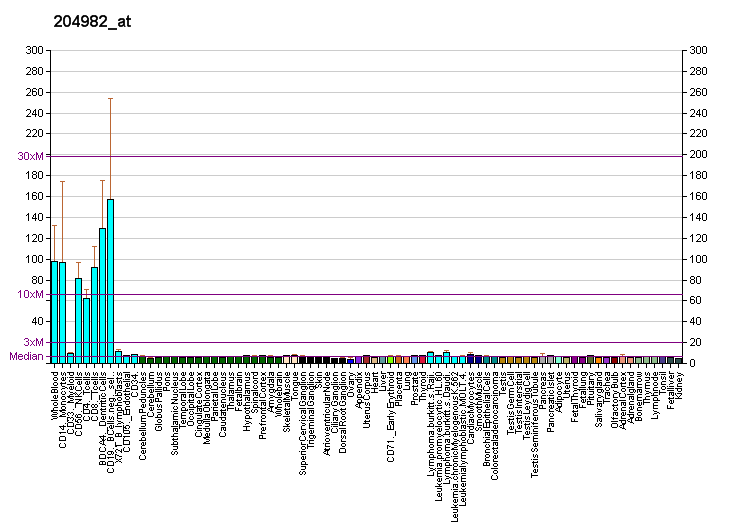
RNA expression pattern
Bgee	Human / Mouse (ortholog); Top expressed in: monocyte; middle temporal gyrus; Brodmann area 23; granulocyte; right hemisphere of cerebellum; blood; body of pancreas; visceral pleura; spleen; bone marrow / Top expressed in: primary oocyte; thymus; granulocyte; internal carotid artery; secondary oocyte; zygote; Rostral migratory stream; external carotid artery; cumulus cell; endothelial cell of lymphatic vessel; More reference expression data
BioGPS	More reference expression data
Gene ontology
Molecular function	protein binding; metal ion binding; GTPase activator activity
Cellular component	focal adhesion; nucleoplasm
Biological process	positive regulation of GTPase activity; regulation of G protein-coupled receptor signaling pathway
Sources:Amigo / QuickGO
Orthologs
Databases	NCBI: entry; OMA: entry
Species	Human	Mouse
Entrez	9815	26431
Ensembl	ENSG00000139436	ENSMUSG00000041890
UniProt	Q14161	Q9JLQ2
RefSeq (mRNA)	NM_001135213; NM_001135214; NM_014776; NM_057169; NM_057170 NM_139201; NM_001330153; NM_001330154	NM_001077359; NM_001077360; NM_019834; NM_001347400
RefSeq (protein)	NP_001128685; NP_001128686; NP_001317082; NP_001317083; NP_055591 NP_476510; NP_476511; NP_631940	NP_001070827; NP_001070828; NP_001334329; NP_062808
Location (UCSC)	Chr 12: 109.93 – 110 Mb	Chr 5: 114.73 – 114.78 Mb
PubMed search
- Wikidata
View/Edit Human	View/Edit Mouse

ARF GTPase-activating protein GIT2 is an enzyme that in humans is encoded by the GIT2 gene.

== Function ==
This gene encodes a member of the GIT protein family. GIT proteins interact with G protein-coupled receptor kinases and possess ADP-ribosylation factor (ARF) GTPase-activating protein (GAP) activity. This gene undergoes extensive alternative splicing; although ten transcript variants have been described, the full length sequence has been determined for only four variants. The various isoforms have functional differences, with respect to ARF GAP activity and to G protein-coupled receptor kinase 2 binding.

== Interactions ==
GIT2 has been shown to interact with GIT1.
