= PAK2 =

Mammalian protein found in Homo sapiens

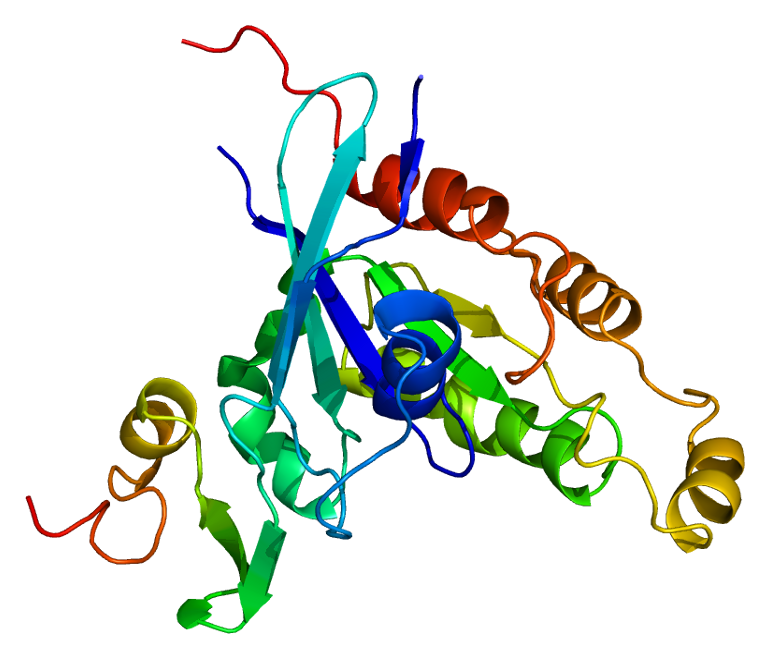

Identifiers
- Aliases: PAK2, PAK65, PAKgamma, p21 (RAC1) activated kinase 2
- External IDs: OMIM: 605022; MGI: 1339984; GeneCards: PAK2
Available structures
PDB	Ortholog search: PDBe RCSB
PDB	List of PDB id codes 3PCS
Enzyme activity
EC #	BRENDA	ExPASy	KEGG	MetaCyc
2.7.11.1	↗	↗	↗	↗

Gene location (Human)
Chr.	Chromosome 3 (human)
Band	3q29	Start	196,739,857 bp
Band	3q29	End	196,832,647 bp

Gene location (Mouse)
Chr.	Chromosome 16 (mouse)
Band	16 B2|16 22.4 cM	Start	31,835,108 bp
Band	16 B2|16 22.4 cM	End	31,898,160 bp
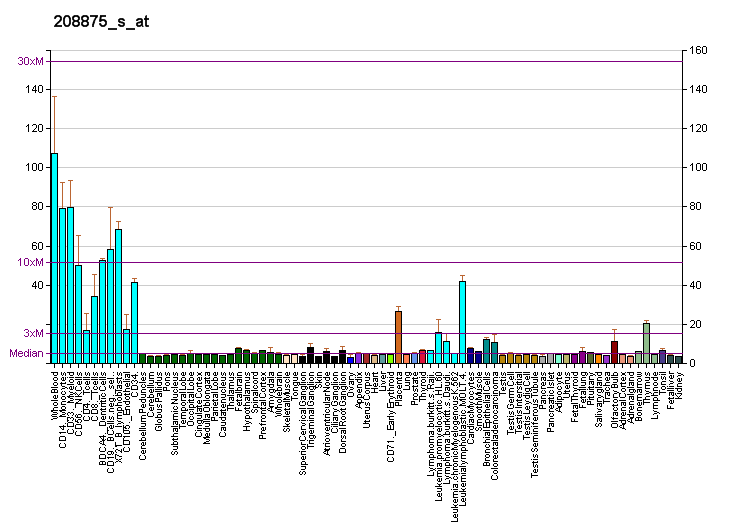

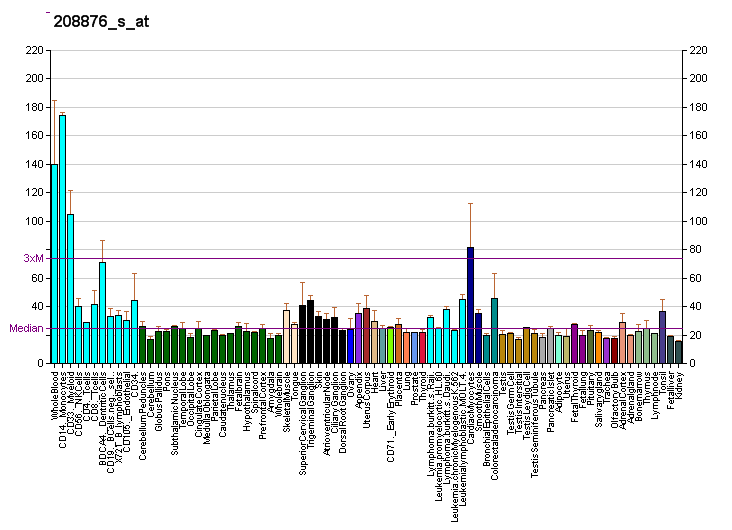

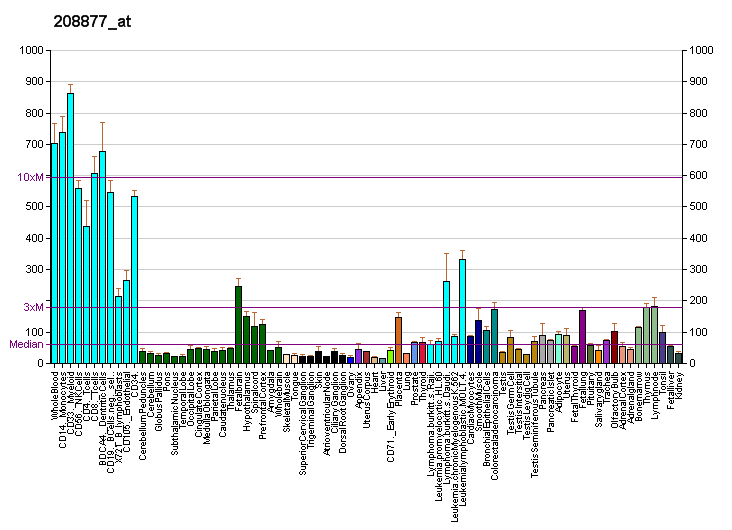
RNA expression pattern
Bgee	Human / Mouse (ortholog); Top expressed in: ganglionic eminence; corpus callosum; ventricular zone; monocyte; superficial temporal artery; Epithelium of choroid plexus; stromal cell of endometrium; Achilles tendon; pericardium; buccal mucosa cell / Top expressed in: Paneth cell; granulocyte; Ileal epithelium; retinal pigment epithelium; aortic valve; ciliary body; vestibular membrane of cochlear duct; renal corpuscle; utricle; ascending aorta; More reference expression data
BioGPS	More reference expression data
Gene ontology
Molecular function	transferase activity; protein kinase activity; nucleotide binding; protein tyrosine kinase activator activity; kinase activity; protein serine/threonine kinase activity; protein binding; catalytic activity; identical protein binding; ATP binding; protein kinase binding; cadherin binding; small GTPase binding
Cellular component	membrane; plasma membrane; perinuclear region of cytoplasm; nucleus; cytoplasm; cytosol; postsynaptic density; glutamatergic synapse
Biological process	negative regulation of protein kinase activity; phosphorylation; T cell costimulation; cellular response to organic cyclic compound; stimulatory C-type lectin receptor signaling pathway; mitigation of host defenses by virus; Fc-epsilon receptor signaling pathway; protein phosphorylation; dendritic spine development; negative regulation of cysteine-type endopeptidase activity involved in execution phase of apoptosis; vascular endothelial growth factor receptor signaling pathway; peptidyl-serine phosphorylation; positive regulation of peptidyl-tyrosine phosphorylation; positive regulation of extrinsic apoptotic signaling pathway; protein autophosphorylation; regulation of growth; metabolism; T cell receptor signaling pathway; signal transduction; positive regulation of protein tyrosine kinase activity; apoptotic process; negative regulation of apoptotic process; viral process; Rho protein signal transduction; regulation of mitotic cell cycle; cell migration; actin cytoskeleton organization; stress-activated protein kinase signaling cascade; regulation of apoptotic process; regulation of MAPK cascade; interleukin-12-mediated signaling pathway; activation of protein kinase activity
Sources:Amigo / QuickGO
Orthologs
Databases	NCBI: entry; OMA: entry
Species	Human	Mouse
Entrez	5062	224105
Ensembl	ENSG00000180370	ENSMUSG00000022781
UniProt	Q13177	Q8CIN4
RefSeq (mRNA)	NM_002577	NM_177326
RefSeq (protein)	NP_002568	NP_796300
Location (UCSC)	Chr 3: 196.74 – 196.83 Mb	Chr 16: 31.84 – 31.9 Mb
PubMed search
- Wikidata
View/Edit Human	View/Edit Mouse

Serine/threonine-protein kinase PAK 2 is an enzyme that in humans is encoded by the PAK2 gene.

PAK2 is one of three members of Group I PAK family of serine/threonine kinases. The PAKs are evolutionary conserved. PAK2 and its cleaved fragment localize in both the cytoplasmic or nuclear compartments. PAK2 signaling modulates apoptosis, endothelial lumen formation, viral pathogenesis, and cancer including, breast, hepatocarcinoma, gastric and cancer, at-large, and, based on its kinase activity alone, peripheral nerve myelination during embryonic development.

== Discovery ==
The human PAK2 was identified as a downstream effector of Rac or Cdc42.

== Gene and spliced variants ==
The PAK2 gene is about 92.7-kb long. The gene contains 15 exons and generates three alternatively spliced transcripts - two of which code proteins of 524 amino acids and 221 amino acids, while the third one is a 371-bp non-coding RNA transcript(Gene from review) There are two transcripts generated from the murine PAK2 gene, a 5.7-kb transcript coding a 524 amino acids long polypeptide and a 1.2-kb long non-coding RNA transcript.

== Protein domains ==
Similar to PAK1, PAK2 contains a p21-binding domain (PBD) and an auto-inhibitory domain (AID) and exists in an inactive conformation.

The p21 activated kinases (PAK) are critical effectors that link Rho GTPases to cytoskeleton reorganization and nuclear signaling. The PAK proteins are a family of serine/threonine kinases that serve as targets for the small GTP binding proteins, CDC42 and RAC1, and have been implicated in a wide range of biological activities. The protein encoded by this gene is activated by proteolytic cleavage during caspase-mediated apoptosis, and may play a role in regulating the apoptotic events in the dying cell.

== Function ==
The p21 activated kinases (PAK) are critical effectors that link Rho GTPases to cytoskeleton reorganization and nuclear signaling. The PAK proteins are a family of serine/threonine kinases that serve as targets for the small GTP binding proteins, CDC42 and RAC1, and have been implicated in a wide range of biological activities. The protein encoded by this gene is activated by proteolytic cleavage during caspase-mediated apoptosis, and may play a role in regulating the apoptotic events in the dying cell. Finally, while both PAK 1 and PAK 2 proteins have been shown to be elevated during the embryonic phase, PAK 2 kinase activity specifically has been demonstrated to be a requirement during the myelenation of developing nerves.

== Upstream activators ==
PAK2 kinase activity is stimulated by transforming growth factor β in fibroblasts, by proteinase inhibitor alpha2-macroglobulin binding to GRP78 in prostate cancer cells, by its phosphorylation by AMP-activated protein kinase in stem and cancer cells and eryptosis. PAK2 is cleaved through activated caspase-3 in fibroblast and cancer cells exposed to ultraviolet, hyperosmotic shock, and ionizing radiation.

== Inhibitors ==
The levels of PAK2 activation in experimental systems are inhibited by synthetic PAK-inhibitors and miRs. For example, FRAX1036 differentially inhibits PAK2 and PAK1 activities; FRAX597 suppresses PAK2 activity in neurofibromatosis type 2 (NF2)-associated tumorigenesis; and miR-23b and miR-137 inhibits PAK2 expression in tumor cells. Insulin stimulation of neuronal cells also antagonizes PAK2 kinase activity, leading to an increased glucose uptake.

== Downstream targets ==
PAK2-mediated phosphorylation of merlin at S518 modulates its tumor suppressor activity, c-Jun phosphorylation at T2, T8, T89, T93 and T286 contributes to the growth of growth factor-stimulated melanoma cells, Caspase-7 phosphorylation at S30, T173 and S239 inhibits apoptotic activity in breast cancer cells, Paxillin phosphorylation at S272 and S274 activates ADAM10 protease, and STAT5 phosphorylation at S779 modulates BCL-ABL-mediated leukemogenesis. PAK2 activity negatively regulates the function and expression of c-Myc: PAK2 phosphorylation of c-Myc at T358-S373-T400 inhibits its transactivation function and PAK2 depletion stimulates c-Myc expression during granulocyte-monocyte lineage.
