= L27 domain =

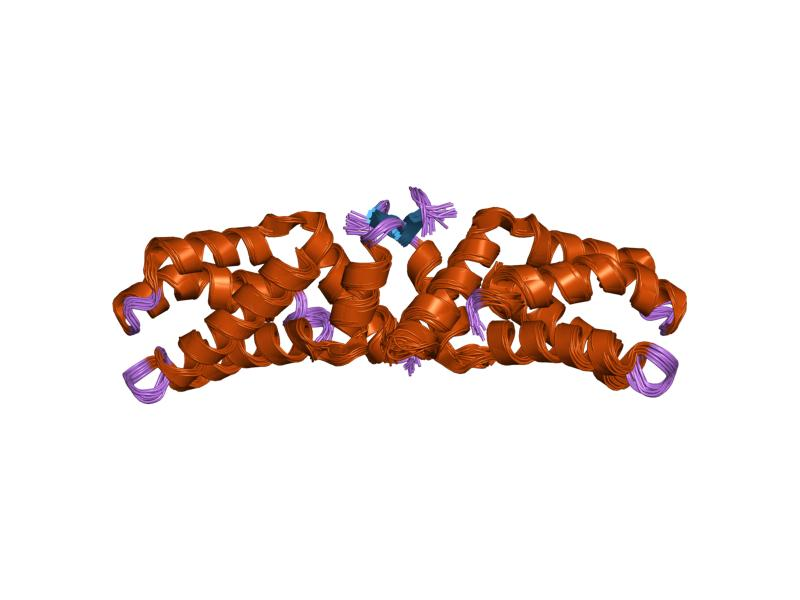
- Structure of presynaptic protein SAP97.

Identifiers
- Symbol: L27
- Pfam: PF02828
- InterPro: IPR014775
Available protein structures:
- Pfam: structures / ECOD
- PDB: RCSB PDB; PDBe; PDBj
- PDBsum: structure summary
- PDB: 1rso, 1va8, 1y74, 1zl8

L27_1
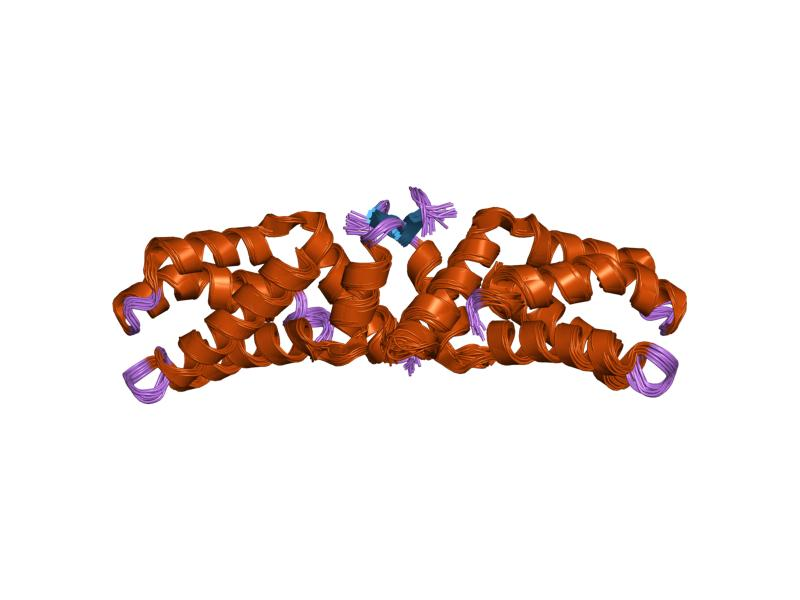
- hetero-tetrameric l27 (lin-2, lin-7) domain complexes as organization platforms of supra-molecular assemblies

Identifiers
- Symbol: L27_1
- Pfam: PF09058
- InterPro: IPR015143
Available protein structures:
- Pfam: structures / ECOD
- PDB: RCSB PDB; PDBe; PDBj
- PDBsum: structure summary

L27_2
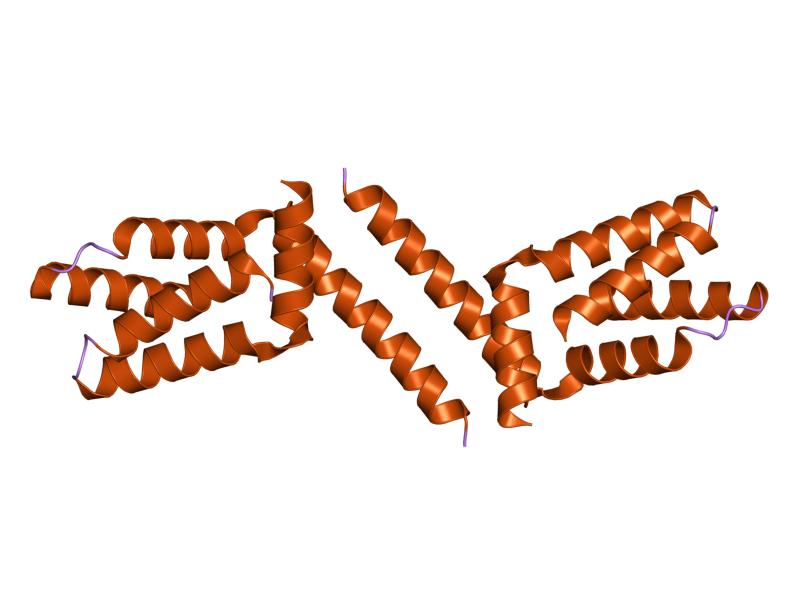
- 2.1 angstrom crystal structure of the pals-1-l27n and patj l27 heterodimer complex

Identifiers
- Symbol: L27_2
- Pfam: PF09045
- InterPro: IPR015132
Available protein structures:
- Pfam: structures / ECOD
- PDB: RCSB PDB; PDBe; PDBj
- PDBsum: structure summary

L27_N
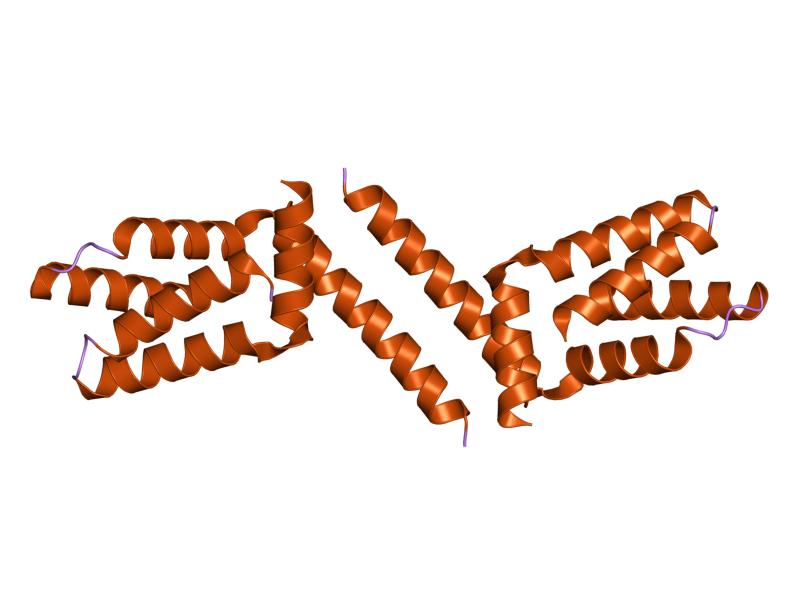
- 2.1 angstrom crystal structure of the pals-1-l27n and patj l27 heterodimer complex

Identifiers
- Symbol: L27_N
- Pfam: PF09060
- InterPro: IPR015145
Available protein structures:
- Pfam: structures / ECOD
- PDB: RCSB PDB; PDBe; PDBj
- PDBsum: structure summary

The L27 domain is a protein domain that is found in receptor targeting proteins Lin-2 and Lin-7 (LIN7A, LIN7B, LIN7C), as well as some protein kinases and human MPP2 protein. The L27 domain is a protein interaction module that exists in a large family of scaffold proteins, functioning as an organisation centre of large protein assemblies required for the establishment and maintenance of cell polarity. L27 domains form specific heterotetrameric complexes, in which each domain contains three alpha-helices. The L27_2 domain is a protein-protein interaction domain capable of organising scaffold proteins into supramolecular assemblies by formation of heteromeric L27_2 domain complexes. L27_2 domain-mediated protein assemblies have been shown to play essential roles in cellular processes including asymmetric cell division, establishment and maintenance of cell polarity, and clustering of receptors and ion channels. Members of this family form specific heterotetrameric complexes, in which each domain contains three alpha-helices. The two N-terminal helices of each L27_2 domain pack together to form a tight, four-helix bundle in the heterodimer, whilst the third helix of each L27_2 domain forms another four-helix bundle that assembles the two units of the heterodimer into a tetramer.

The L27_N domain is often found at the N-terminus of the L27 domain. It plays a role in the biogenesis of tight junctions and in the establishment of cell polarity in epithelial cells. Each L27_N domain consists of three alpha-helices, the first two of which form an antiparallel coiled-coil. Two L27 domains come together to form a four-helical bundle with the antiparallel coiled-coils formed by the first two helices. The third helix of each domain forms another coiled-coil packing at one end of the four-helix bundle, creating a large hydrophobic interface: the hydrophobic interactions are the major force that drives heterodimer formation.
