= PXDC1 =

Identifiers
- Aliases: PXDC1, C6orf145, PX domain containing 1
- External IDs: MGI: 1914145; GeneCards: PXDC1

Gene location (Human)
| Chr. | Chromosome 6 (human) |
| Band | 6p25.2 | Start | 3,722,614 bp |
| Band | 6p25.2 | End | 3,751,713 bp |

Gene location (Mouse)
| Chr. | Chromosome 13 (mouse) |
| Band | 13 A3.3|13 | Start | 34,811,817 bp |
| Band | 13 A3.3|13 | End | 34,837,469 bp |
RNA expression pattern
| Bgee | Human / Mouse (ortholog); Top expressed in: ascending aorta; Descending thoracic aorta; popliteal artery; tibial arteries; right coronary artery; saphenous vein; right lobe of liver; left coronary artery; subcutaneous adipose tissue; vena cava / Top expressed in: left lobe of liver; right lung lobe; molar; otolith organ; utricle; epithelium of small intestine; endothelial cell of lymphatic vessel; semi-lunar valve; jejunum; aortic valve; More reference expression data |
| BioGPS | n/a |
Orthologs
| Databases | NCBI: entry; OMA: entry |
| Species | Human | Mouse |
| Entrez | 221749 | 66895 |
| Ensembl | ENSG00000168994 | ENSMUSG00000021411 |
| UniProt | Q5TGL8 | Q8JZU6 |
| RefSeq (mRNA) | NM_183373 | NM_025831; NM_001382845 |
| RefSeq (protein) | NP_899229 | NP_080107; NP_001369774 |
| Location (UCSC) | Chr 6: 3.72 – 3.75 Mb | Chr 13: 34.81 – 34.84 Mb |
| PubMed search |
- Wikidata
| View/Edit Human | View/Edit Mouse |

The PX (Phox homology) domain-containing 1, also known as PXDC1 and C6orf145, is a protein which in humans is encoded by the protein coding gene PXDC1. Transcript variant 1 is the longest transcript at 1,878 bp and encodes the longest isoform which is 231 amino acids long. It is predicted to be involved in enabling phosphatidylinositol binding activity. The tissues with the highest expression include the liver, placenta, and gallbladder.

== Gene ==
=== Common aliases ===
PXDC1 is also known as c6orf145.

=== Number of exons ===
Homo sapiens PXDC1 transcript variant 1 contains 8 exons, with 5 of them in the coding sequence.

=== Span of gene ===
Found on chromosome 6 (6p25.2) in the minus strand and spans 29,095 bp.

== mRNA ==
=== Transcript variants ===
| Transcript variant | Accession # | Length (nt) | Exons | Protein isoform | Accession # | Length (aa) | Molecular Weight (kDa) |
| Variant 1 | NM_183373.4 | 1878 | 1-5 | 1 | NP_899229.2 | 231 | 27 |
| Variant X2 | XM_011514393.4 | 1718 | 2-5 | X1 | XP_011512695.1 | 170 | 19 |

Transcript variants of PXDC1 gene.

=== Expression pattern ===
PXDC1 is ubiquitously expressed in variable amounts across all tissues. The fold difference in expression ranges from 2x-11x. The tissues with the highest expression are the liver, placenta, kidney, and gallbladder.

=== Conceptual translation ===
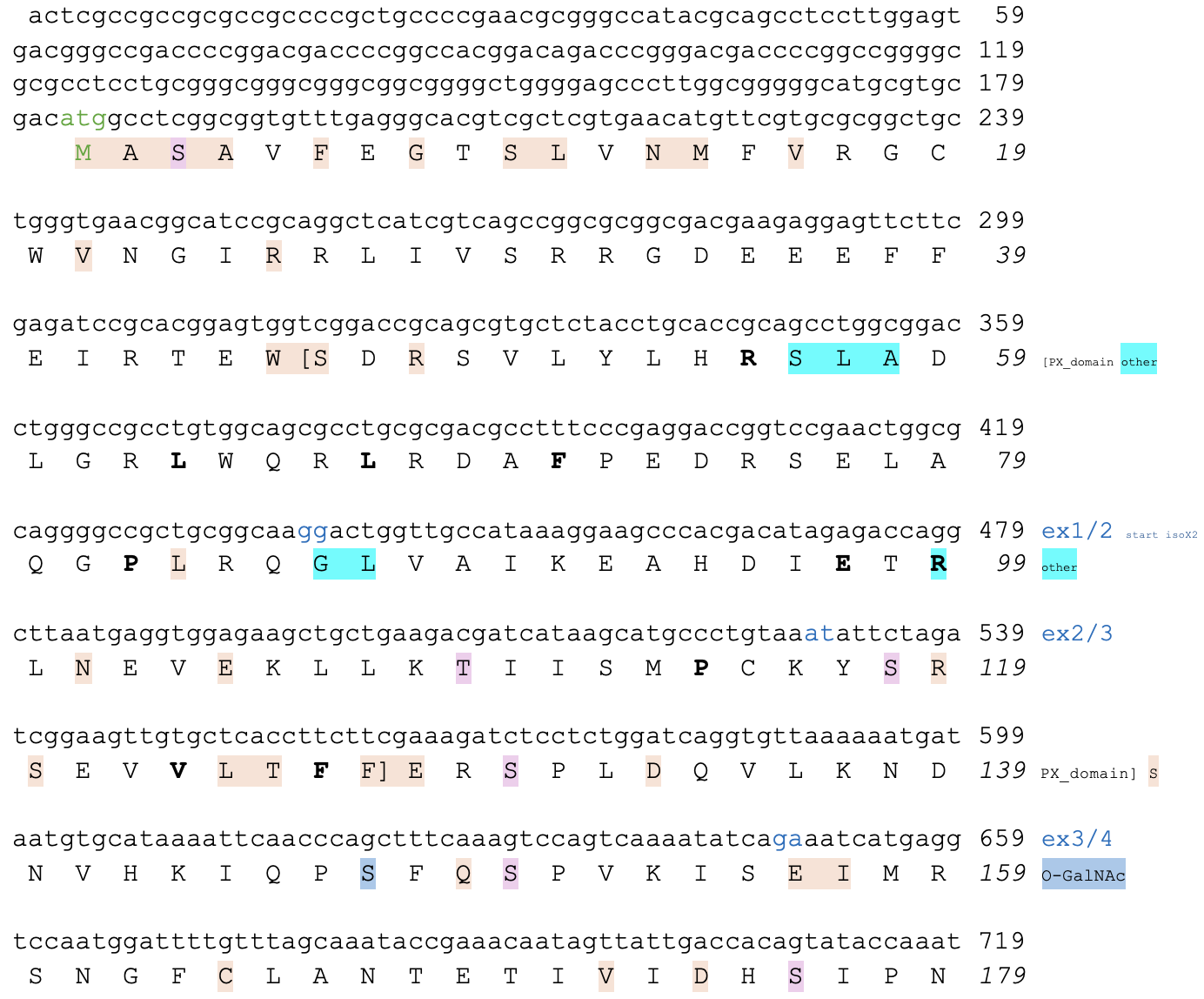
Part 1 of conceptual translation of human PXDC1 isoform 1.

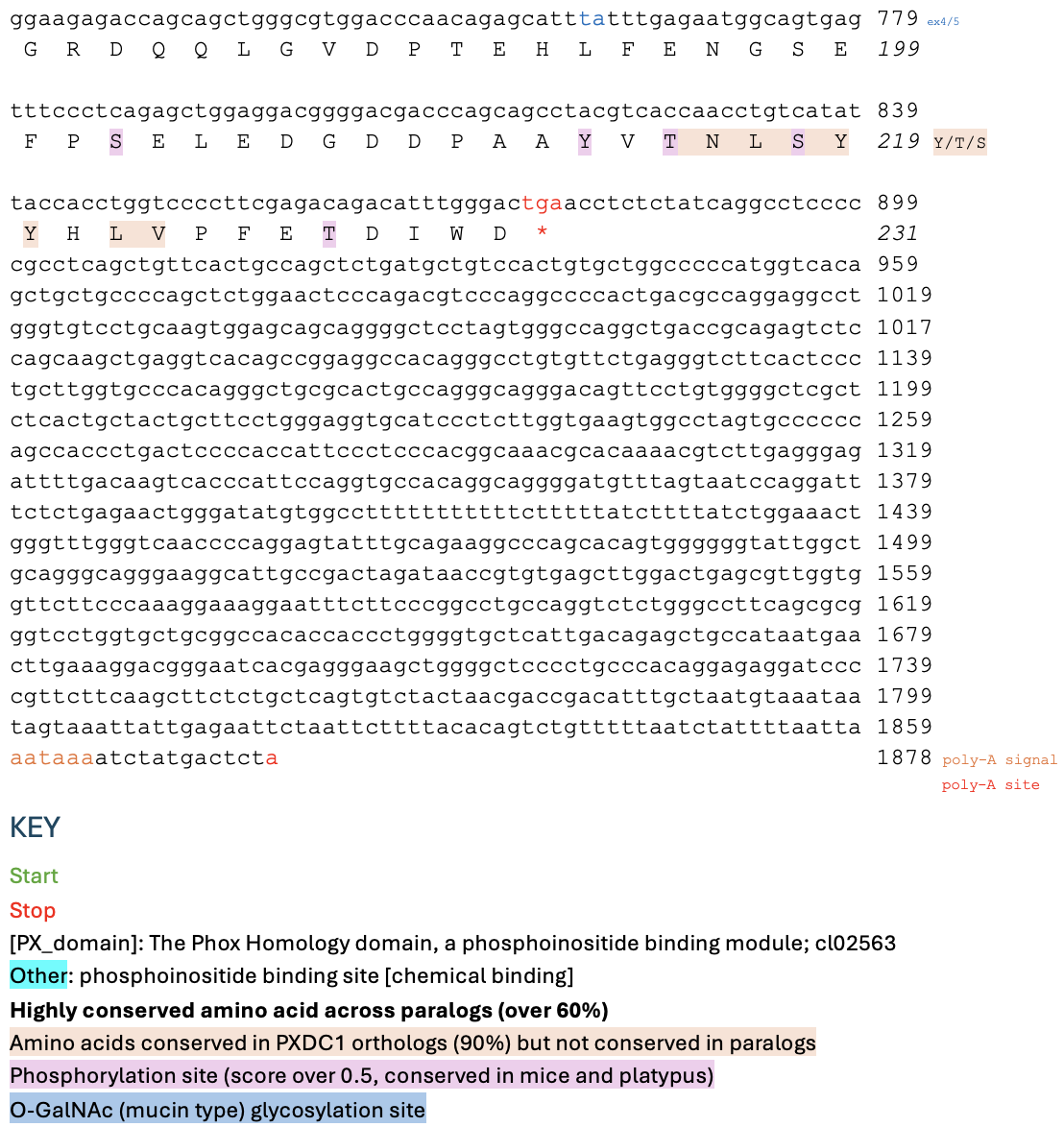
Part 2 and key of conceptual translation of human PXDC1 isoform 1.

== Protein ==
=== Known isoforms ===
Transcript variants are shown in previous mRNA heading. These encode two isoforms:

- PXDC1 isoform 1: 231 amino acids
- PXDC1 isoform X1: 170 amino acids

The information below pertains to isoform 1.

=== MW, pI, amino acid composition ===
The mass of the protein is about 27 kDa and has a pI of 5. The composition of amino acids is comparable to that of a typical human protein, however the difference between the number of lysine and arginine residues compared to that of glutamate and aspartate is negative compared to the average human protein. This is consistent with the observed pI, which indicates acidity.

=== Domains and motifs ===
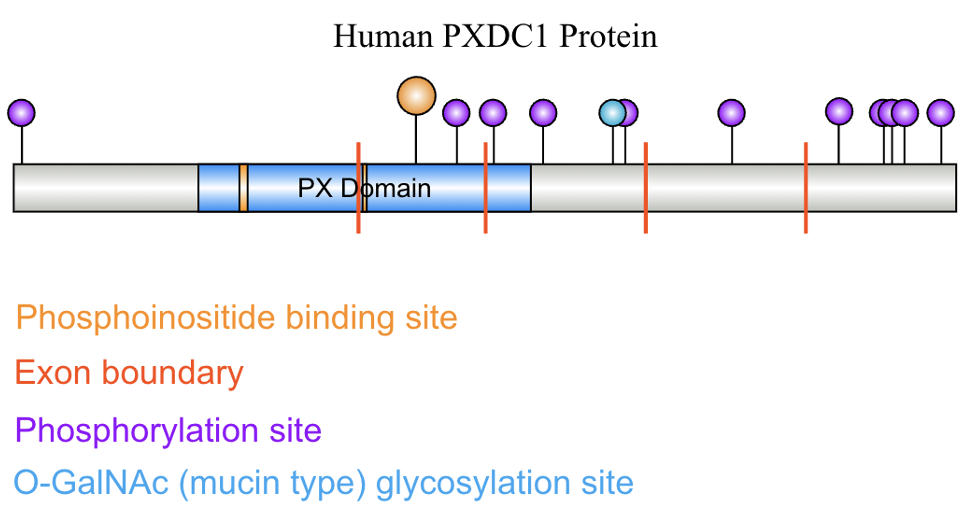
Protein diagram for human PXDC1 highlighting domains, exon boundaries, and predicted post-translational modifications.

=== Post-translational modifications ===
| Location | Kinase | Full name |
| S3 | cdc2 | Cyclin-dependent kinase 1 |
| T109 | PKC | Protein Kinase C |
| S118 | unsp | - |
| S130 | unsp | - |
| S150 | cdk5 | Cyclin-dependent kinase 5 |
| S176 | unsp | - |
| S202 | unsp | - |
| Y213 | unsp | - |
| T215 | PKG | Protein Kinase G |
| S218 | DNAPK | DNA-dependent protein kinase |
| T227 | CKII | Casein Kinase 2 |

Phosphorylation sites in PXDC1 protein.

Residue S147 is also predicted to be O-GalNAc (mucin type) glycosylated.

=== Structure ===
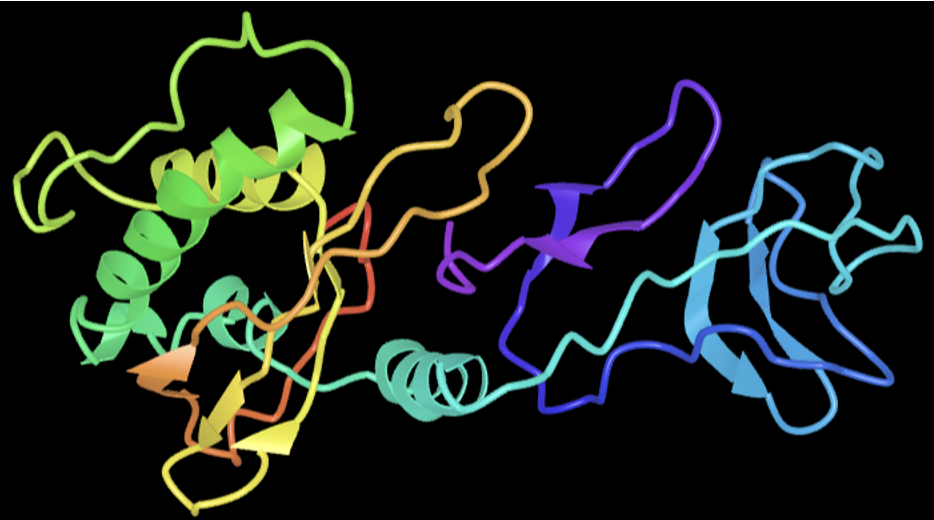
Predicted secondary and tertiary structure of PXDC1 human protein. Coloring is red for N terminus and purple for C terminus with progression through rainbow colors.

=== Subcellular localization ===
Localized to the cytosolic face of the plasma membrane, and is associated peripherally.

=== Protein interactions ===
| Interactor | Full Name | Description | Score |
| LIN7C | Protein lin-7 homolog C | Plays a role in establishing/maintaining the asymmetric distribution of channels/receptors at the plasma membrane of polarized cells. | 0.731 |
| RABGAP1L | Rab GTPase-activating protein 1-like | GTP-hydrolysis activating protein (GAP) for small GTPase RAB22A. Plays a role in endocytosis and intracellular protein transport. | 0.623 |
| LIN7B | Protein lin-7 homolog B | Plays a role in establishing/maintaining the asymmetric distribution of channels/receptors at the plasma membrane of polarized cells. | 0.610 |

Table 4. Common interactors that were found with PXDC1.

== Homology ==
=== Orthologs ===
PXDC1 orthologs are present in mammals, birds, reptiles, amphibians, bony fish, cartilaginous fish, and jawless fish, but not in any invertebrates, plants, protists, fungi, or bacteria. The protein sequence is highly conserved with over 75% similarity back to cartilaginous fish.

| Class | Genus and Species | Common Name | Taxonomic Group | Median Date of Divergence (MYA) | Accession # | Sequence Length (aa) | Identity (%) | Similarity (%) |
| Mammalia | Homo sapiens | Human | Primates | 0 | NP_899229.2 | 231 | 100 | 100 |
| Mammalia | Mus musculus | Mouse | Rodents | 87 | NP_080107.3 | 231 | 92 | 94 |
| Mammalia | Phascolarctos cinereus | Koala | Marsupials | 160 | XP_020829466.1 | 231 | 90 | 94 |
| Mammalia | Notamacropus eugenii | Tammar wallaby | Marsupials | 160 | XP_072459796.1 | 231 | 89 | 94 |
| Mammalia | Ornithorhynchus anatinus | Platypus | Monotremes | 180 | XP_001508393.1 | 231 | 87 | 92 |
| Aves | Gallus gallus | Chicken | Fowl | 319 | XP_040520929.1 | 231 | 84 | 92 |
| Reptilia | Pogona vitticeps | Central bearded dragon | Squamata | 319 | XP_020645452.1 | 231 | 86 | 92 |
| Reptilia | Mauremys mutica | Yellowpond turtle | Turtles | 319 | XP_044863675.1 | 231 | 86 | 92 |
| Amphibia | Ambystoma mexicanum | Axolotl | Salamanders | 352 | XP_069469606.1 | 231 | 86 | 92 |
| Amphibia | Microcaecilia unicolor | Tiny cayenne caecilian | Caecilians | 352 | XP_030064485.1 | 230 | 85 | 92 |
| Amphibia | Bufo bufo | Common toad | Anura | 352 | XP_040288672.1 | 231 | 81 | 91 |
| Fish | Protopterus annectens | West African lungfish | Lobe-finned fish | 408 | XP_043937493.1 | 231 | 73 | 87 |
| Fish | Latimeria chalumnae | West Indian Ocean coelacanth | Lobe-finned fish | 415 | XP_006007320.1 | 231 | 84 | 90 |
| Fish | Seriola dumerili | Greater amberjack | Ray-finned fish | 429 | XP_022604539.1 | 233 | 73 | 86 |
| Fish | Liparis tanakae | Tanaka's snailfish | Ray-finned fish | 429 | TNN44386.1 | 230 | 73 | 86 |
| Fish | Carcharodon carcharias | Great white shark | Sharks | 462 | XP_041039133.1 | 228 | 76 | 89 |
| Fish | Pristiophorus japonicus | Japanese sawshark | Sawsharks | 462 | XP_070735904.1 | 228 | 76 | 88 |
| Fish | Callorhinchus milii | Elephant shark | Chimaeras | 462 | XP_007900829.1 | 230 | 74 | 86 |
| Fish | Leucoraja erinaceus | Little skate | Skates | 462 | XP_055509634.1 | 227 | 62 | 76 |
| Fish | Myxine glutinosa | Atlantic hagfish | Hagfish | 563 | XP_067972370.1 | 263 | 36 | 48 |

Table of orthologs to human PXDC1.

==== Evolution speed ====
PXDC1 has a slow evolution rate compared to that of the fibrinogen alpha chain. It has a speed similar to that of cytochrome c.

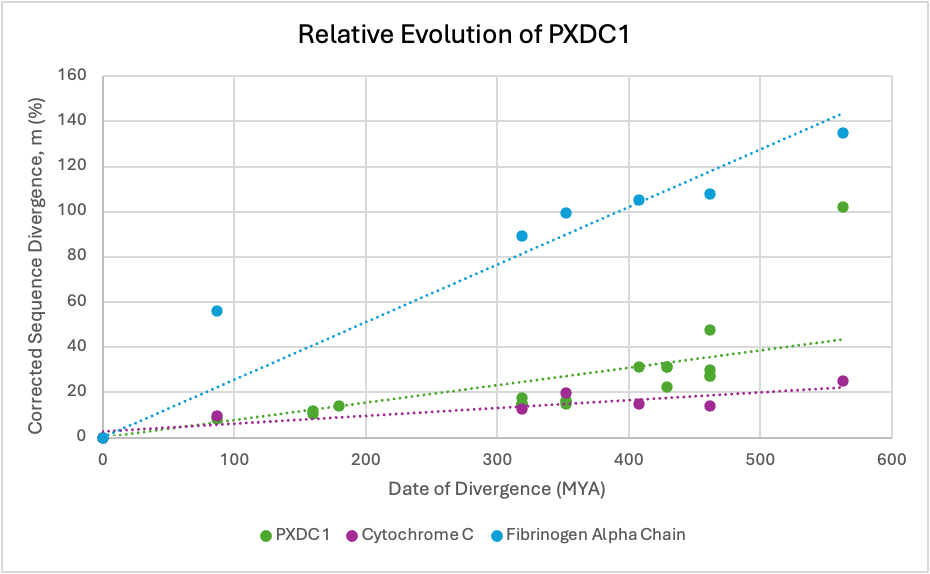
Graph of relative evolution of PXDC1 compared to that of cytochrome c and the fibrinogen alpha chain. All 20 orthologs were used to construct the PXDC1 line.

=== Paralogs ===
There are no direct paralogs of PXDC1, however, there are 49 proteins in humans that also contain the PX domain. Within this superfamily, there is a class of proteins similar to PXDC1 in that the only domain present is PX. These are highlighted in the table below.

| Protein | Accession # | Sequence Length (aa) | Similarity (%) | Domain Similarity (%) |
| PXDC1 | NP_899229.2 | 231 | 100 | 100 |
| HS1BP3 | NP_071905.3 | 392 | 18.4 | 28.6 |
| SNX3 | NP_003786.1 | 162 | 22.1 | 26.3 |
| SNX11 | AAD27834.1 | 264 | 24.5 | 21.4 |
| SNX12 | AAD48491.1 | 162 | 22.3 | 21.2 |
| SNX24 | NP_054754.1 | 169 | 27 | 20.1 |
| SNX10 | AAD27833.1 | 201 | 24.7 | 17.9 |
| SNX22 | NP_079074.2 | 193 | 11.2 | 9 |

== Clinical significance ==
Various studies have been conducted in which PXDC1 expression levels have been monitored. In dioxin (TCDD) sensitive mice, PXDC1 expression in the liver significantly repressed after exposure. This suggests PXDC1 may have a role in sensitivity to this toxin. Another study showed that in the process of differentiation of dental pulp stem cells, PXDC1 was one of the genes whose expression was significantly down-regulated. This suggests it has a role in osteo/odontoblast differentiation. It has also been shown that PXDC1 has a parent-of-origin expression bias, which favored the paternal allele. It is also less than 100 kB away from a known imprinted gene FAM50B. Along with this, PXDC1 had a 2:1 paternal expression bias in lymphoblastoid cell lines and whole blood.
