= L27 =

L27 or L-27 may refer to:

- L27 domain, a protein domain
- 60S ribosomal protein L27
- Buick L27 engine, a V6 automobile engine
- Cessna L-27, a light utility aircraft of the U.S. Air Force
- HMS L27, a submarine of the Royal Navy
- HMS Hastings (L27), a sloop of the Royal Navy
- Klemm L 27, a German training aircraft
- Lectionary 27, a medieval Greek manuscript
