= CZIB =

Protein-coding gene in humans

Identifiers
- Aliases: CZIB, chromosome 1 open reading frame 123, C1orf123, CXXC motif containing zinc binding protein
- External IDs: MGI: 1921348; GeneCards: CZIB

Gene location (Human)
Chr.	Chromosome 1 (human)
Band	1p32.3	Start	53,214,099 bp
Band	1p32.3	End	53,220,634 bp

Gene location (Mouse)
Chr.	Chromosome 4 (mouse)
Band	4|4 C7	Start	107,747,010 bp
Band	4|4 C7	End	107,756,581 bp
RNA expression pattern
Bgee	Human / Mouse (ortholog); Top expressed in: tendon of biceps brachii; body of uterus; right coronary artery; muscle layer of sigmoid colon; popliteal artery; tibial arteries; right ovary; canal of the cervix; left uterine tube; left ovary / Top expressed in: genital tubercle; tail of embryo; neural layer of retina; lens; yolk sac; ventricular zone; dentate gyrus of hippocampal formation granule cell; spermatocyte; neural tube; muscle of thigh; More reference expression data
BioGPS	n/a
Gene ontology
Molecular function	molecular function; zinc ion binding; metal ion binding
Cellular component	extracellular exosome
Biological process	biological process
Sources:Amigo / QuickGO
Orthologs
Databases	NCBI: entry; OMA: entry
Species	Human	Mouse
Entrez	54987	74098
Ensembl	ENSG00000162384	ENSMUSG00000028608
UniProt	Q9NWV4	Q8BHG2
RefSeq (mRNA)	NM_001304759; NM_001304760; NM_017887	NM_028754; NM_001347160
RefSeq (protein)	NP_001291688; NP_001291689; NP_060357	NP_001334089; NP_083030
Location (UCSC)	Chr 1: 53.21 – 53.22 Mb	Chr 4: 107.75 – 107.76 Mb
PubMed search
- Wikidata
View/Edit Human	View/Edit Mouse

CXXC motif containing zinc binding protein is a protein that in humans is encoded by the gene CZIB (previously C1orf123). Misfolded mutant variants of this zinc-binding protein have been found to interact with CCS (an enzyme-activating protein), but the full length version does not.

== Gene ==
CZIB is a gene located in the human genome on the short arm of chromosome 1 at p32.2, between 53,679,771 base pairs and 53,686,289 base pairs. It is 6,519 bases long with 8 exons and encodes the C1orf123 protein, also known as UPF0587.

Gene Neighborhood

The following genes are close to CZIB on chromosome 1

-LRP8:This gene encodes a member of the low density lipoprotein receptor (LDLR) family, a cell surface protein that plays a role in both signal transduction and receptor-mediated endocytosis of specific ligands for lysosomal degradation.

-CPT2: This gene encodes a nuclear protein that is transported to the mitochondrial inner membrane.

-MAGOH: Encodes protein that is a component of a splicing-dependent multiprotein exon junction complex (EJC) deposited at splice junction on mRNAs.

-SLC1A7: Transports L-glutamate. Its associated chloride conductance may participate in visual processing.

== Protein ==
The CZIB protein is 160 amino acids in length and weighs 18.0 kdal. It has an isoelectric point of 4.73 and belongs to the domain/family DUF866 which consists of many hypothetical eukaryotic proteins of unknown function, all of them with a length around 165 residues. Aliases of the protein include FLJ20580 and UPF0587 Protein

== Homology ==
CZIB has many orthologs in close and distant species including primates, mammals, reptiles, birds, invertebrates, moss and yeast. The protein sequences are highly conserved throughout these species, although mRNA transcripts of the gene have only been found in primates. There are no paralogs of C1orf123.

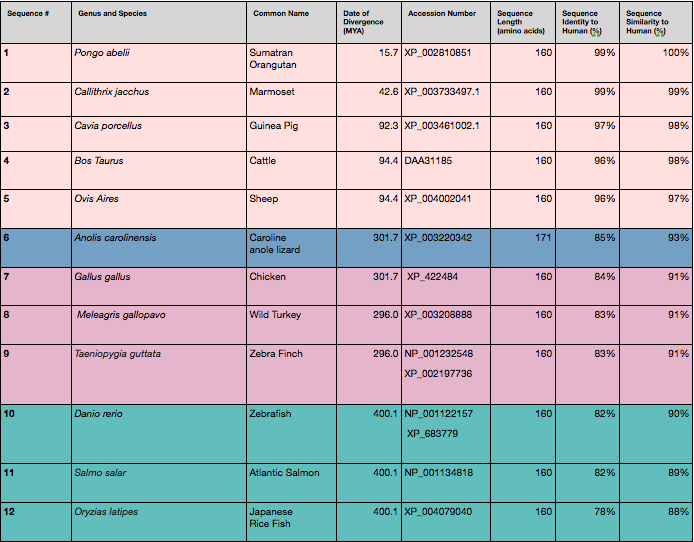
Orthologs of C1orf123

Phylogenetic Tree

== Structure ==
The C1orf123 protein has no transmembrane regions so is therefore likely not a transmembrane protein. Three post-translational modification sites have been experimentally found, including a phosphotyrosine, phosphoserine, and glycyl-lysine isopeptide. A portion of the 3' UTR of C1orf123 has 100% identity with the mRNA for Homo sapiens carnitine palmitoyltransferase 2 is a nuclear gene that encodes mitochondrial protein. This gene works with carnitine palmitoyltransferase I, and the encoded protein oxidizes long-chain fatty acids in the mitochondria. C1orf123 protein secondary structure has been found to be very similar to that of MAL13P1.257 protein. C1orf123 protein is thought to have seven beta-sheet regions and one alpha helix region and according to the Phyre2 program, there is 100% confidence that the structure of 95% of the C1orf123 protein matches the hypothetical protein MAL13P1.257. The MAL13P1.257 is a hypothetical conserved plasmodium protein of unknown function

== Gene expression ==
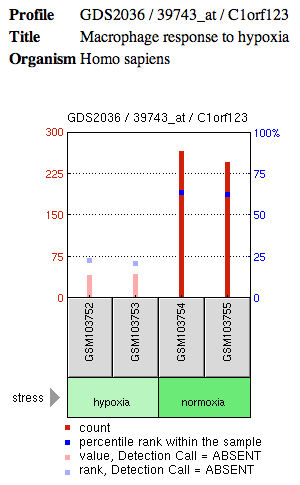
C1orf123 Expression Under Hypoxic Conditions

Various gene expression data has shown that "C1orf123" is expressed in varying amounts within the human body. It is most highly expressed in nerve and pituitary glands and not expressed in other body sites such as ear, esophagus, larynx, and tonsil. When health states were compared for the expression of "C1orf123" it was found that expression of the gene increased in adrenal tumors and decreased to below normal levels in kidney and lung tumors. For developmental stages, "C1orf123" is most highly expressed in the fetus and not at all expressed in neonates and infants. For the most part, "C1orf123" is expressed in relatively average amounts in the human body with the exception of CD34+ and CD56+NK cells where expression is twice the amount of the average. GEO profiles give some insight into the expression of "C1orf123" under varying conditions. Expression of the gene is seen to be absent under hypoxic conditions as seen in the figure below. GEO profiles also show that expression of "C1orf123" does not change in papillary thyroid cancer or chlamydia pneumonia infection.

== Clinical significance ==
The loss of the short arm of chromosome 1, the part of chromosome 1 that C1orf123 is located on, cause and parathyroid gland tumorigenesis resulting in hyperparathyroidism. 60% of the tumors tested showed an alteration on either 1p or the MEN1 locus or both. The conclusion of this study is that the short arm of chromosome 1 contains at least two different tumor suppressor genes involved in parathyroid tumorigenesis.
