= C15orf61 =

Gene on human chromosome 15

Identifiers
- Aliases: C15orf61, chromosome 15 open reading frame 61
- External IDs: MGI: 1916728; GeneCards: C15orf61

Gene location (Human)
Chr.	Chromosome 15 (human)
Band	15q23	Start	67,521,131 bp
Band	15q23	End	67,530,146 bp

Gene location (Mouse)
Chr.	Chromosome 9 (mouse)
Band	9|9 C	Start	63,301,729 bp
Band	9|9 C	End	63,306,528 bp
RNA expression pattern
Bgee	Human / Mouse (ortholog); Top expressed in: secondary oocyte; vastus lateralis muscle; myocardium of left ventricle; biceps brachii; tibialis anterior muscle; endothelial cell; Skeletal muscle tissue of biceps brachii; deltoid muscle; body of tongue; Skeletal muscle tissue of rectus abdominis / Top expressed in: right kidney; seminiferous tubule; proximal tubule; muscle of thigh; lens; lumbar subsegment of spinal cord; embryo; superior frontal gyrus; spermatocyte; primary visual cortex; More reference expression data
BioGPS	n/a
Orthologs
Databases	NCBI: entry; OMA: entry
Species	Human	Mouse
Entrez	145853	69478
Ensembl	ENSG00000189227	ENSMUSG00000032403
UniProt	A6NNL5	Q0VG49
RefSeq (mRNA)	NM_001143936	NM_027090
RefSeq (protein)	NP_001137408	NP_081366
Location (UCSC)	Chr 15: 67.52 – 67.53 Mb	Chr 9: 63.3 – 63.31 Mb
PubMed search
- Wikidata
View/Edit Human	View/Edit Mouse

Chromosome 15 open reading frame 61 (c15orf61) is a uncharacterized, human-protein coding gene. This gene encodes a 157-amino-acid protein with a molecular weight of 18.1kDa. C15orf61 is evolutionarily conserved and has orthologs in various species, including mammals, birds, reptiles, amphibians, fishes, and invertebrates.

== Gene ==
Locus

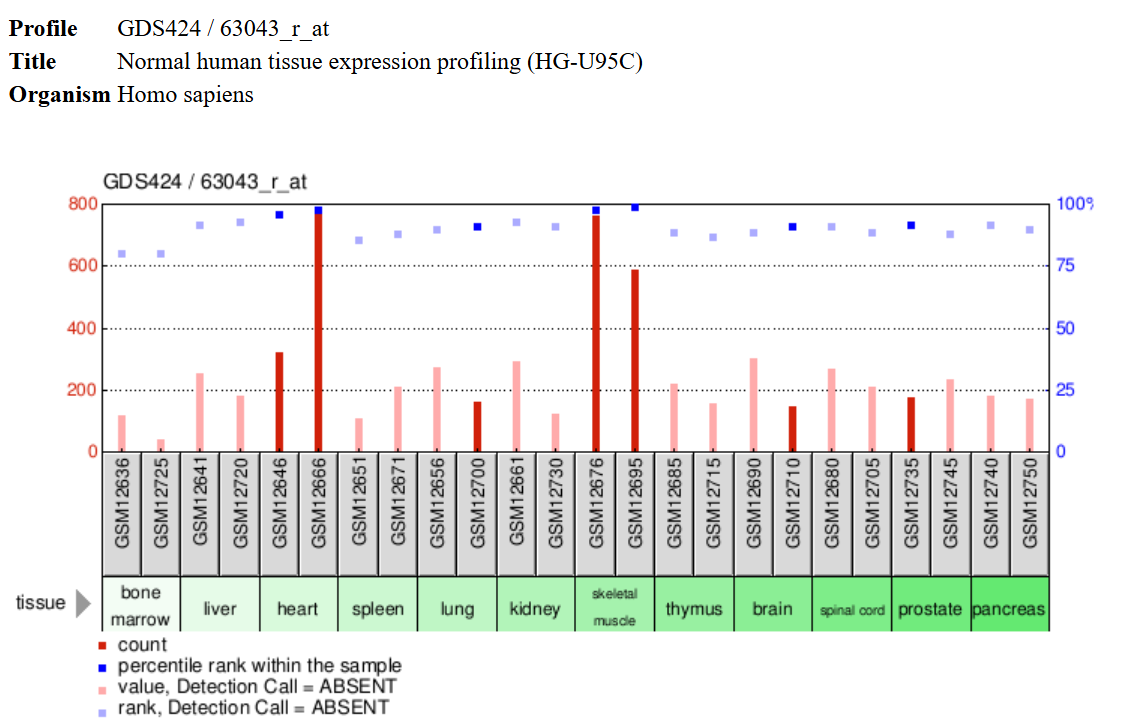
Microarray of tissue expression of c15orf61 in humans

C15orf61 is composed of two exons and spans from base pair 67,521,131 to 67,530,146 on the plus strand. C15orf61 is flanked by the gene IQCH upstream and the gene MAP2K5 downstream.

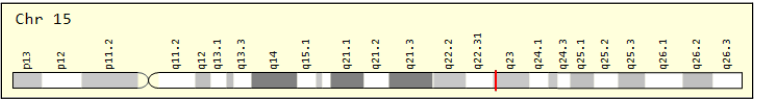
C15orf61 Ideogram. C15orf61 is located at position 15q23.

=== Expression ===
C15orf61 is ubiquitously expressed across human tissues with moderate variability. Expression of c15orf61 is highest in skeletal muscle, fat, and cerebellum brain tissues.

== mRNA ==
C15orf61 contains 4,193 nucleotides. There are no known isoforms for c15orf61.

== Protein ==
The protein encoded by c15orf61 is 157 amino acids long. The theoretical molecular weight is 18.1kDa and the predicted isoelectric point is 9.9. The isoelectric point of c15orf61 is higher than the average human protein.

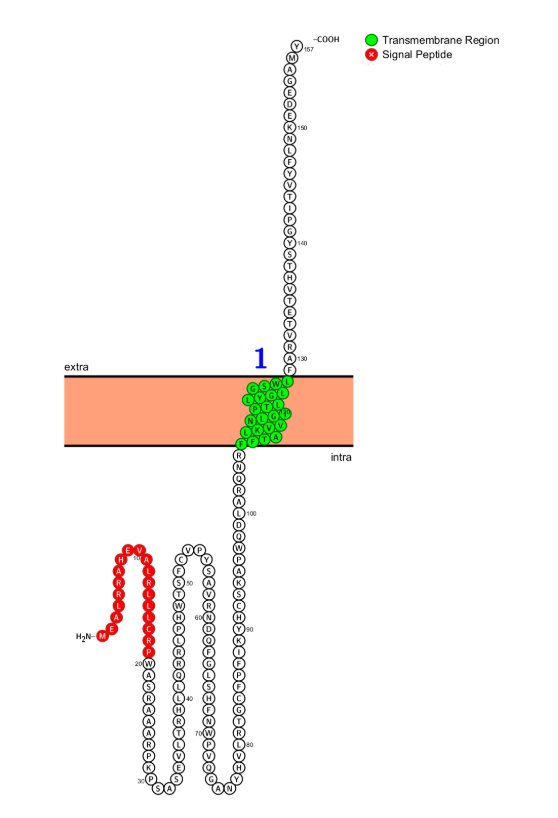
Illustration of protein encoded by c15orf61, including the signal peptide and transmembrane region. Tertiary structure of c15orf61 protein

=== Domains and motifs ===
C15orf61 is part of the conserved protein domain family DUF4528. A L27 domain, associated with protein-protein interactions was also identified. C15orf61 is rich in histidine, arginine and tryptophan, and deficient in aspartate compared to other human proteins.

==== Subcellular localization and topology ====
The protein encoded by c15orf61 has a signal peptide consisting of amino acids 1-19. There is also one transmembrane region. The protein is predicted to be localized in the mitochondria with a 95% confidence. However, it is also predicted at a lower confidence (30.4%) to be cytoplasmic. The high isoelectric point of 9.9, which would suggest mitochondrial localization due to the high pH of the mitochondrial matrix.

=== Post-translational modifications ===
The protein encoded by c15orf61 has been shown to be phosphorylated at position 31-34 by Casein Kinase II. A tyrosine kinase phosphorylation was identified at positions 150-157. There is also a cleavage site to cleave the 19 amino acid N-terminal signal peptide.

=== Secondary and tertiary structure ===
The structure of the protein encoded by c15orf61 consists of alpha helices and beta strands. A predicted tertiary structure of the protein encoded by c15orf61 is shown to the right.

== Protein Interactions ==
Protein name	Function	Basis of identification	Subcellular location
CTLA4 (cytotoxic T-lymphocyte-associated protein 4)	Member of the immunoglobulin superfamily and encodes a protein which transmits an inhibitory signal to T cells	Co-immuno precipitation	Golgi apparatus
TNIP2 (TNFAIP3 interacting protein 2)	Encodes a protein which acts as an inhibitor of NFkappaB activation. The encoded protein is also involved in MAP/ERK signaling pathway	Co-immuno precipitation	Cytosol
VIPR2 (vasoactive intestinal peptide receptor 2)	Receptor for VIP as well as PACAP-38 and -27, the activity of this receptor is mediated by G proteins which activate adenylyl cyclase	Co-immuno precipitation	Cytosol
ORF7B (SARS-CoV-2 accessory protein 7B)	Interferes with the host’s innate immune response by targeting and suppressing TOM70, part of the mitochondrial antiviral-signaling protein (MAVS) pathway	Co-immuno precipitation	Host mitochondria

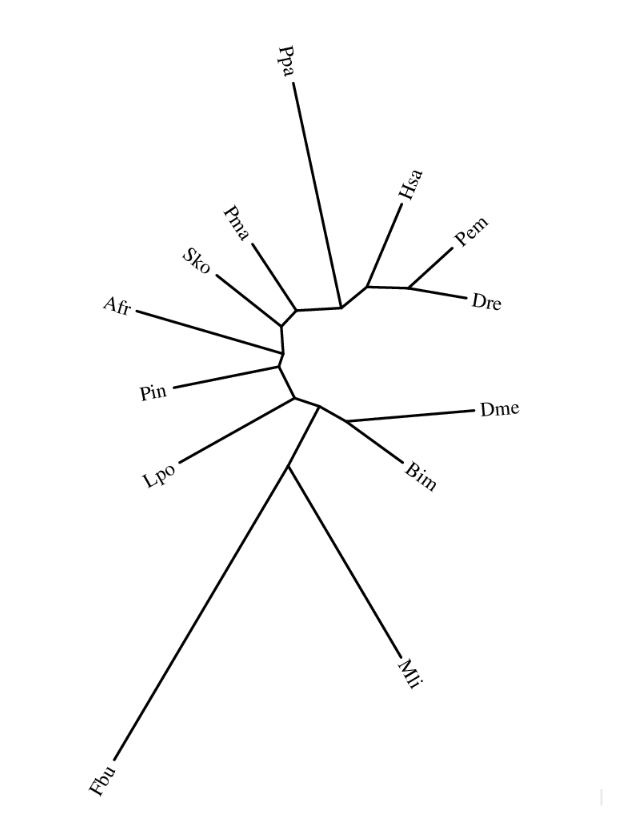
Phylogenetic tree of c15orf61 in humans and orthologs, identified by species name abbreviations.

== Homology and evolution ==
=== Orthologs ===
C15orf61 shows high sequence identity in mammals, with human and mouse proteins sharing over 92% identity. The protein length is consistent across most species, though some invertebrates, such as worms and flukes, show significantly lower sequence identity (ranging from 36.9% to 54.1%) and longer evolutionary divergence.

Phylogenetic analysis indicates that the corrected sequence divergence increases with taxonomic distance, reflecting the evolutionary history and functional conservation of the protein.

Below is a table of a variety of orthologs for human c15orf61. Table includes closely, moderately, and distantly related orthologs, listed in descending order of the date of divergence.

Animal type	Species name	Common name	Taxonomic group	Date of divergence (MYA)	Percent identity	Seq similarity	Accession number
Mammal	Homo sapiens	Human	Mammalia	0	100%	100.0%	NP_001137408
Mammal	Galeopterus variegatus	Sunda flying lemur	Dermoptera	79	95.5%	96.8%	XP_008581098
Mammal	Mus musculus	House mouse	Rodentia	87	92.3%	95.5%	NP_081366
Mammal	Ailuropoda melanoleuca	Giant panda	Carnivora	94	94.9%	95.5%	XP_034516667
Bird	Gallus gallus	Chicken	Galliformes	319	74.5%	82.2%	NP_001269258
Reptile	Euleptes europaea	European leaf-toed gecko	Squamata	319	70.7%	80.9%	XP_056721932
Amphibian	Xenopus laevis	African clawed frog	Anura	352	69.4%	80.9%	XP_018108803
Fish	Betta splendens	Siamese fighting fish	Perciformes	429	64.6%	74.7%	XP_029010739
Fish	Periophthalmus magnuspinnatus	Korean giant-fin mudskipper	Gobiiformes	429	63.9%	74.1%	XP_033824044
Fish	Danio rerio	Zebrafish	Cyprinidae	429	63.3%	70.9%	NP_001076422
Fish	Hypanus sabinus	Antlatic stingray	Myliobatiformes	462	48.2%	59.4%	XP_059808977
Fish	Petromyzon marinus	Sea lamprey	Agnathans	536	59.2%	71.3%	XP_032804365
Invertebrate	Saccoglossus kowalevskii	Acorn worm	Enteropneusta	619	54.1%	67.2%	XP_002740887
Invertebrate	Bombus impatiens	Common eastern bumblebee	Insecta	686	53.5%	70.4%	XP_012237208
Invertebrate	Penaeus indicus	Indian prawn	Decapoda	686	48.5%	62.0%	XP_063605333
Invertebrate	Limulus polyphemus	Antlantic horseshoe crab	Xiphosura	686	45.9%	56.4%	XP_013780284
Invertebrate	Drosophila melanogaster	Fruit fly	Insecta	686	44.7%	57.9%	NP_788708
Invertebrate	Artemia franciscana	Brine shrimp	Branchiopoda	686	49.1%	67.9%	XP_065579866
Invertebrate	Ischnura elegans	Blue-tailed damselfly	Insecta	686	47.8%	66.0%	XP_046398922
Invertebrate	Fasciolopsis buski	Giant intestinal fluke	Trematoda	686	36.9%	52.9%	KAA0199948
Invertebrate	Macrostomum lignano	Flatworm	Macrostomida	686	44.3%	62.0%	PAA50735.1
Invertebrate	Paralvinella palmiformis	Palm worm	Terebellida	686	39.9%	48.7%	KAK2159949

=== Evolution ===
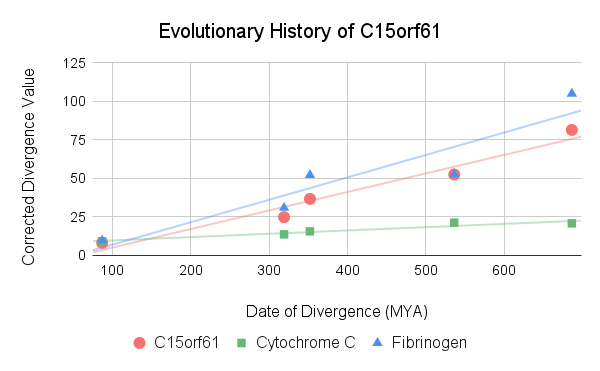
Divergence graph of c15orf61, fibrinogen, and cytochrome c

The rate of evolution of c15orf61 was compared to that of cytochrome c and fibrinogen. C15orf61 appears to be evolving at a moderate pace, slower than fibrinogen alpha chain but faster than cytochrome c. This suggests that C15orf61 is not under intense evolutionary pressure to evolve rapidly, but is in a complex that has the ability to mutate over time.

== Clinical significance ==
=== Disease association ===
C15ord61 has been implicated to be involved in mitochondrial function, having shown significant negative correlation between c15orf61 and mitochondrial respiratory conductance. Research has also suggested C15orf61 potentially influences transcriptional regulation in immune and neuronal tissues, having significantly different levels of expression in tissues taken from patients with autoimmune disorders such as rheumatoid arthritis, diabetes, and multiple sclerosis.
