= KCNJ4 =

Protein-coding gene in the species Homo sapiens

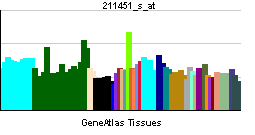

Identifiers
- Aliases: KCNJ4, HIR, HIRK2, HRK1, IRK-3, IRK3, Kir2.3, potassium voltage-gated channel subfamily J member 4, potassium inwardly rectifying channel subfamily J member 4
- External IDs: OMIM: 600504; MGI: 104743; GeneCards: KCNJ4
Available structures
PDB	Ortholog search: PDBe RCSB
PDB	List of PDB id codes 3GJ9

Gene location (Human)
Chr.	Chromosome 22 (human)
Band	22q13.1	Start	38,426,327 bp
Band	22q13.1	End	38,455,199 bp

Gene location (Mouse)
Chr.	Chromosome 15 (mouse)
Band	15 E1|15 37.74 cM	Start	79,367,915 bp
Band	15 E1|15 37.74 cM	End	79,389,442 bp
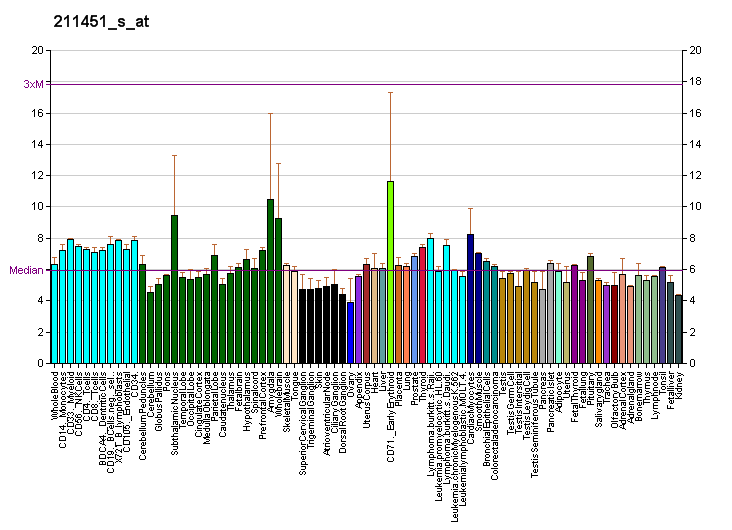

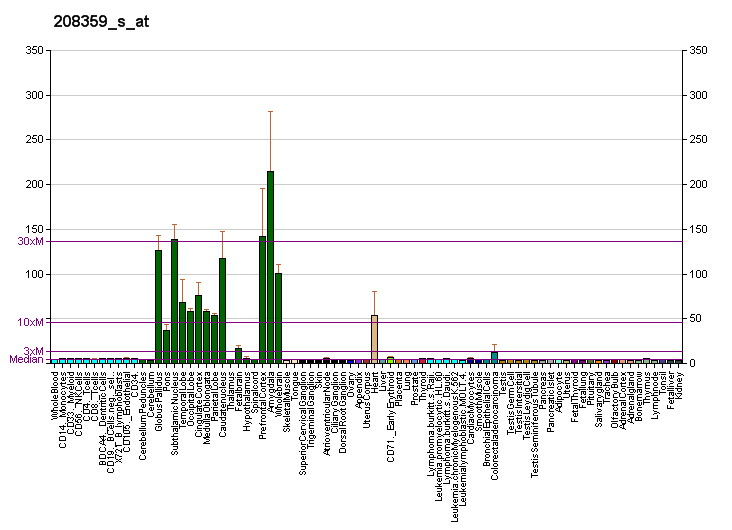
RNA expression pattern
Bgee	Human / Mouse (ortholog); Top expressed in: endothelial cell; middle temporal gyrus; Brodmann area 10; Brodmann area 23; frontal pole; superior frontal gyrus; postcentral gyrus; Brodmann area 46; Region I of hippocampus proper; entorhinal cortex / Top expressed in: superior frontal gyrus; primary visual cortex; perirhinal cortex; dentate gyrus of hippocampal formation granule cell; entorhinal cortex; prefrontal cortex; hippocampus proper; nucleus accumbens; CA3 field; primary motor cortex; More reference expression data
BioGPS	More reference expression data
Gene ontology
Molecular function	protein binding; voltage-gated ion channel activity; PDZ domain binding; inward rectifier potassium channel activity; G-protein activated inward rectifier potassium channel activity
Cellular component	synapse; cytoplasmic vesicle membrane; voltage-gated potassium channel complex; cell junction; integral component of membrane; membrane; cytoplasmic vesicle; basolateral plasma membrane; postsynaptic membrane; plasma membrane
Biological process	regulation of ion transmembrane transport; ion transport; potassium ion transport; potassium ion import across plasma membrane; cardiac conduction
Sources:Amigo / QuickGO
Orthologs
Databases	NCBI: entry; OMA: entry
Species	Human	Mouse
Entrez	3761	16520
Ensembl	ENSG00000168135	ENSMUSG00000044216
UniProt	P48050	P52189
RefSeq (mRNA)	NM_152868; NM_004981	NM_008427
RefSeq (protein)	NP_004972; NP_690607	n/a
Location (UCSC)	Chr 22: 38.43 – 38.46 Mb	Chr 15: 79.37 – 79.39 Mb
PubMed search
- Wikidata
View/Edit Human	View/Edit Mouse

Inward rectifier potassium channel 4, also known as K_{ir}2.3, is a protein encoded in the human by the KCNJ4 gene.

== Function ==
Several different potassium channels are known to be involved with electrical signaling in the nervous system. One class is activated by depolarization whereas a second class is not. The latter are referred to as inwardly rectifying K+ channels, and they have a greater tendency to allow potassium to flow into the cell rather than out of it. This asymmetry in potassium ion conductance plays a key role in the excitability of muscle cells and neurons. The protein encoded by this gene is an integral membrane protein and member of the inward rectifier potassium channel family. The encoded protein has a small unitary conductance compared to other members of this protein family. Two transcript variants encoding the same protein have been found for this gene.

== Interactions ==
KCNJ4 has been shown to interact with:

- CASK,
- DLG1
- DLG4,
- LIN7B, and
- LIN7C.

== See also ==
- Inward-rectifier potassium ion channel
