= KCNJ12 =

Protein-coding gene in the species Homo sapiens

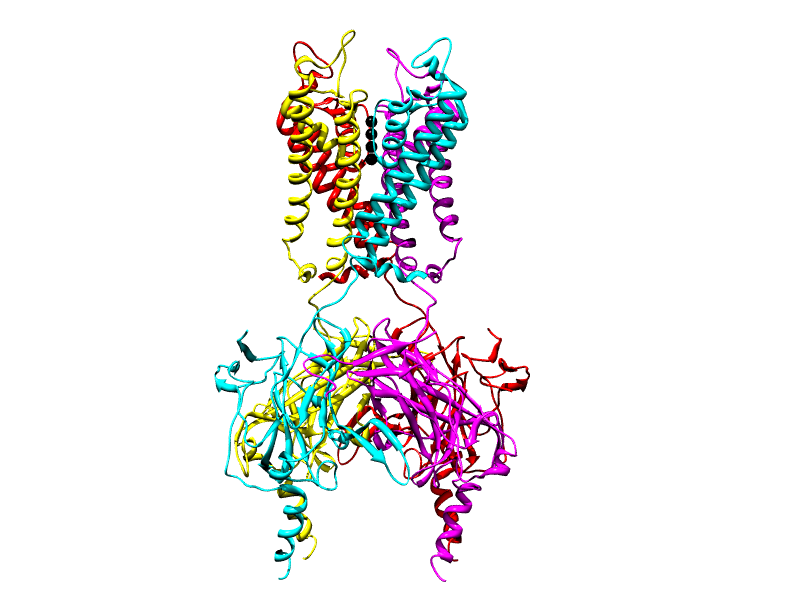

Identifiers
- Aliases: KCNJ12, IRK-2, IRK2, KCNJN1, Kir2.2, Kir2.2v, hIRK, hIRK1, hkir2.2x, kcnj12x, potassium voltage-gated channel subfamily J member 12, potassium inwardly rectifying channel subfamily J member 12
- External IDs: OMIM: 602323; MGI: 108495; GeneCards: KCNJ12

Gene location (Human)
Chr.	Chromosome 17 (human)
Band	17p11.2	Start	21,376,357 bp
Band	17p11.2	End	21,419,870 bp

Gene location (Mouse)
Chr.	Chromosome 11 (mouse)
Band	11 B2|11 37.96 cM	Start	60,913,390 bp
Band	11 B2|11 37.96 cM	End	60,961,957 bp
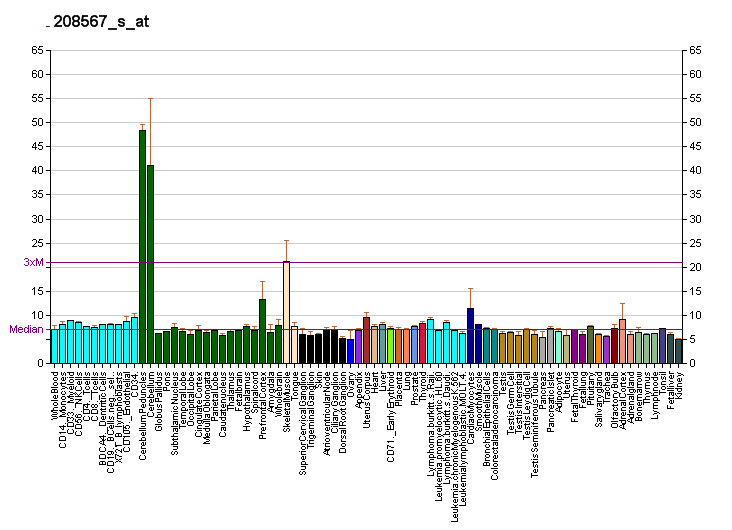

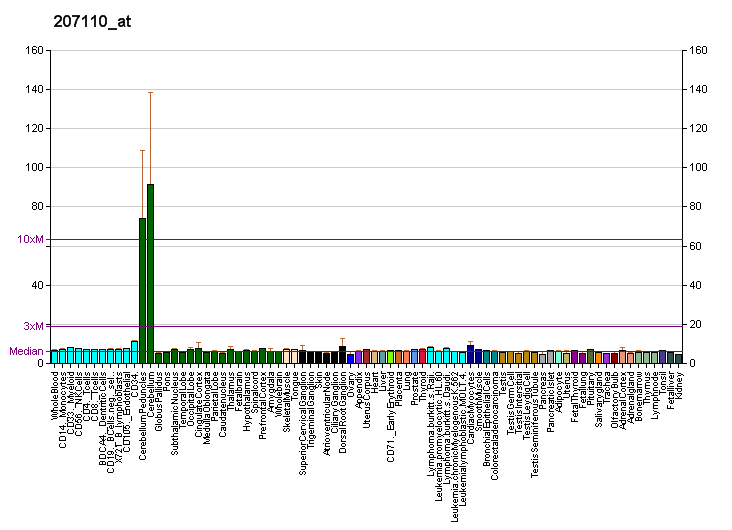
RNA expression pattern
Bgee	Human / Mouse (ortholog); Top expressed in: Skeletal muscle tissue of rectus abdominis; cerebellar vermis; muscle of thigh; cerebellar hemisphere; right hemisphere of cerebellum; gastrocnemius muscle; quadriceps femoris muscle; vastus lateralis muscle; tibialis anterior muscle; Skeletal muscle tissue of biceps brachii / Top expressed in: muscle of thigh; cerebellar cortex; lumbar spinal ganglion; sternocleidomastoid muscle; lens; triceps brachii muscle; skeletal muscle tissue; knee joint; temporal muscle; quadriceps femoris muscle; More reference expression data
BioGPS	More reference expression data
Gene ontology
Molecular function	inward rectifier potassium channel activity; voltage-gated ion channel activity; G-protein activated inward rectifier potassium channel activity; protein binding
Cellular component	integral component of membrane; intrinsic component of membrane; plasma membrane; integral component of plasma membrane; membrane
Biological process	potassium ion transport; regulation of ion transmembrane transport; muscle contraction; regulation of heart contraction; protein homotetramerization; ion transport; potassium ion import across plasma membrane; cardiac conduction
Sources:Amigo / QuickGO
Orthologs
Databases	NCBI: entry; OMA: entry
Species	Human	Mouse
Entrez	3768	16515
Ensembl	ENSG00000184185	ENSMUSG00000042529
UniProt	Q14500	P52187
RefSeq (mRNA)	NM_021012	NM_001267593; NM_010603
RefSeq (protein)	NP_066292	NP_001254522; NP_034733
Location (UCSC)	Chr 17: 21.38 – 21.42 Mb	Chr 11: 60.91 – 60.96 Mb
PubMed search
- Wikidata
View/Edit Human	View/Edit Mouse

ATP-sensitive inward rectifier potassium channel 12 is a lipid-gated ion channel that in humans is encoded by the KCNJ12 gene.

== Function ==
This gene encodes an inwardly rectifying K^{+} channel that may be blocked by divalent cations. This protein is thought to be one of multiple inwardly rectifying channels that contribute to the cardiac inward rectifier current (IK1). The gene is located within the Smith–Magenis syndrome region on chromosome 17.

== Interactions ==
KCNJ12 has been shown to interact with:

- APBA1,
- CASK,
- DLG1,
- DLG2,
- DLG3,
- DLG4,
- LIN7A
- LIN7B, and
- LIN7C.

== See also ==
- Inward-rectifier potassium channel
