= APBA1 =

Protein-coding gene in the species Homo sapiens

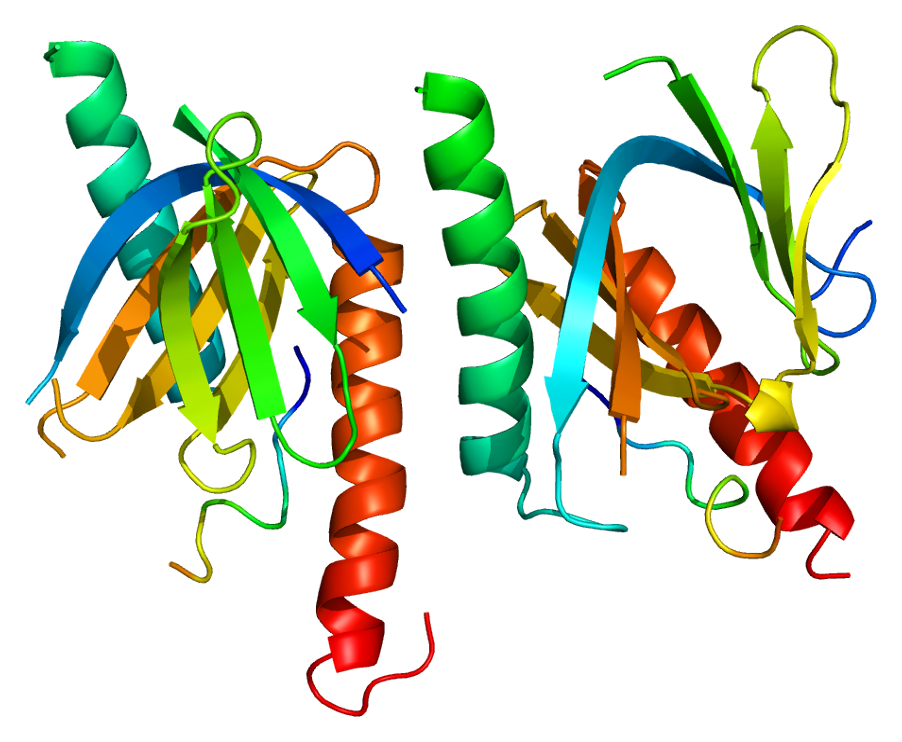

Identifiers
- Aliases: APBA1, D9S411E, LIN10, MINT1, X11, X11A, X11ALPHA, amyloid beta precursor protein binding family A member 1
- External IDs: OMIM: 602414; MGI: 1860297; GeneCards: APBA1
Available structures
PDB	Ortholog search: PDBe RCSB
PDB	List of PDB id codes 1AQC, 1U37, 1U38, 1U39, 1U3B, 1X11, 1X45, 1Y7N

Gene location (Human)
Chr.	Chromosome 9 (human)
Band	9q21.12	Start	69,427,532 bp
Band	9q21.12	End	69,672,371 bp

Gene location (Mouse)
Chr.	Chromosome 19 (mouse)
Band	19|19 B	Start	23,736,251 bp
Band	19|19 B	End	23,926,960 bp
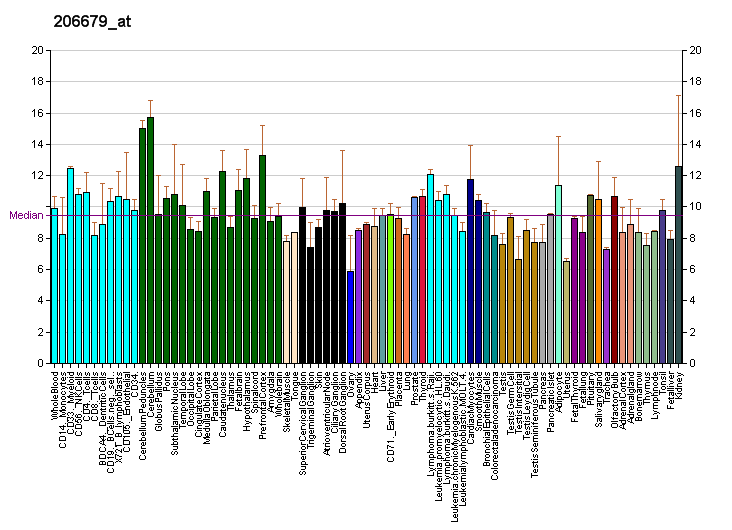
RNA expression pattern
Bgee	Human / Mouse (ortholog); Top expressed in: superior frontal gyrus; prefrontal cortex; right frontal lobe; temporal lobe; amygdala; anterior cingulate cortex; dorsolateral prefrontal cortex; hypothalamus; Brodmann area 9; nucleus accumbens / Top expressed in: habenula; ventral tegmental area; visual cortex; primary visual cortex; dentate gyrus of hippocampal formation granule cell; pontine nuclei; inferior colliculi; central gray substance of midbrain; medial dorsal nucleus; subiculum; More reference expression data
BioGPS	More reference expression data
Gene ontology
Molecular function	amyloid-beta binding; protein binding
Cellular component	cytoplasm; cytosol; membrane; synaptic vesicle; perinuclear region of cytoplasm; nucleus; neuron projection; Golgi apparatus; presynaptic active zone membrane; Schaffer collateral - CA1 synapse; glutamatergic synapse; plasma membrane; dendritic spine; synapse
Biological process	locomotory behavior; multicellular organism growth; axo-dendritic transport; in utero embryonic development; nervous system development; glutamate secretion; cell adhesion; regulation of gene expression; protein transport; intracellular protein transport; gamma-aminobutyric acid secretion; neurotransmitter secretion; chemical synaptic transmission; protein-containing complex assembly; regulation of synaptic vesicle exocytosis
Sources:Amigo / QuickGO
Orthologs
Databases	NCBI: entry; OMA: entry
Species	Human	Mouse
Entrez	320	319924
Ensembl	ENSG00000107282; ENSG00000276497	ENSMUSG00000024897
UniProt	Q02410	B2RUJ5
RefSeq (mRNA)	NM_001163	NM_177034
RefSeq (protein)	NP_001154	NP_796008
Location (UCSC)	Chr 9: 69.43 – 69.67 Mb	Chr 19: 23.74 – 23.93 Mb
PubMed search
- Wikidata
View/Edit Human	View/Edit Mouse

Amyloid beta A4 precursor protein-binding family A member 1 is a protein that in humans is encoded by the APBA1 gene.

== Function ==
The protein encoded by this gene is a member of the X11 protein family. It is a neuronal adaptor protein that interacts with the Alzheimer's disease amyloid precursor protein (APP). It stabilises APP and inhibits production of proteolytic APP fragments including the A beta peptide that is deposited in the brains of Alzheimer's disease patients. This gene product is believed to be involved in signal transduction processes. It is also regarded as a putative vesicular trafficking protein in the brain that can form a complex with the potential to couple synaptic vesicle exocytosis to neuronal cell adhesion.

== Interactions ==
APBA1 has been shown to interact with KCNJ12, CCS, CASK and Amyloid precursor protein.
