= CASK =

Protein-coding gene in humans

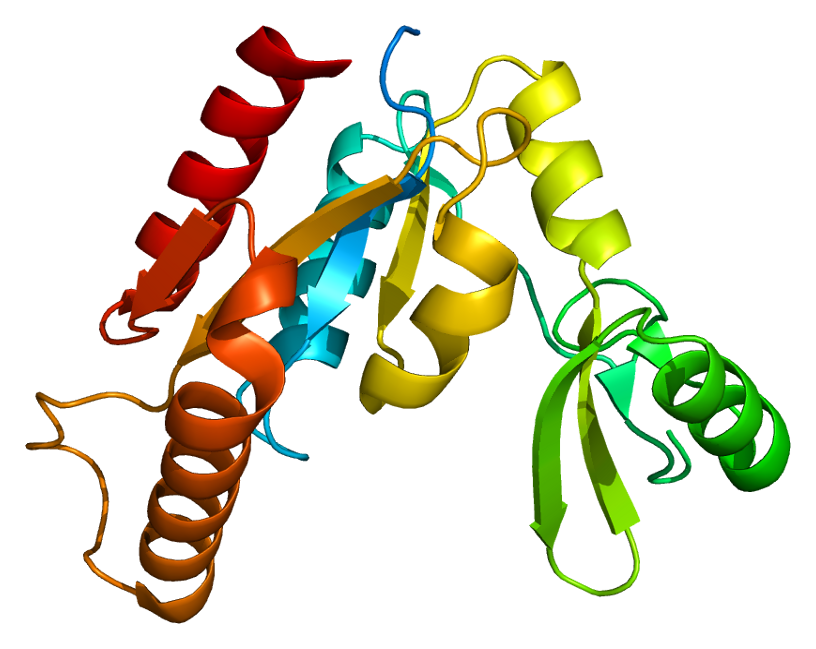

Identifiers
- Aliases: CASK, CAGH39, CAMGUK, CMG, FGS4, LIN2, MICPCH, MRXSNA, TNRC8, calcium/calmodulin-dependent serine protein kinase (MAGUK family), calcium/calmodulin dependent serine protein kinase, hCASK
- External IDs: OMIM: 300172; MGI: 1309489; GeneCards: CASK
Available structures
PDB	Ortholog search: PDBe RCSB
PDB	List of PDB id codes 1KGD, 1KWA, 1ZL8, 3C0G, 3C0H, 3C0I, 3MFR, 3MFS, 3MFT, 3MFU, 3TAC
Enzyme activity
EC #	BRENDA	ExPASy	KEGG	MetaCyc
2.7.11.1	↗	↗	↗	↗

Gene location (Human)
Chr.	X chromosome (human)
Band	Xp11.4	Start	41,514,934 bp
Band	Xp11.4	End	41,923,554 bp

Gene location (Mouse)
Chr.	X chromosome (mouse)
Band	X A1.1|X 8.43 cM	Start	13,383,319 bp
Band	X A1.1|X 8.43 cM	End	13,717,606 bp
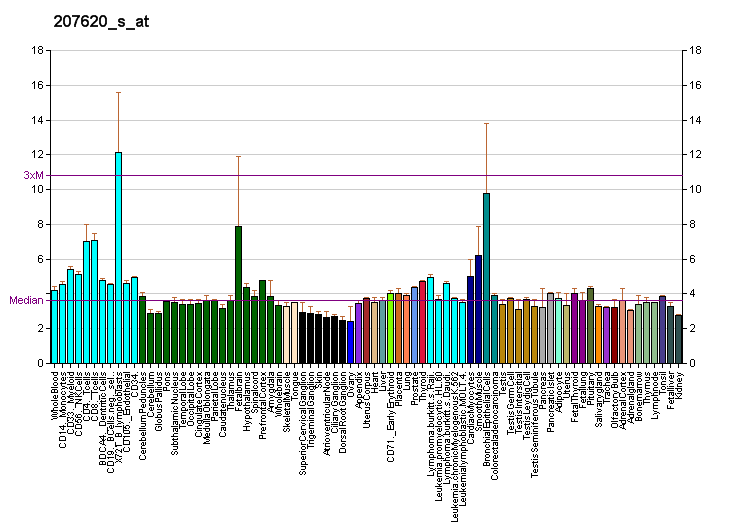

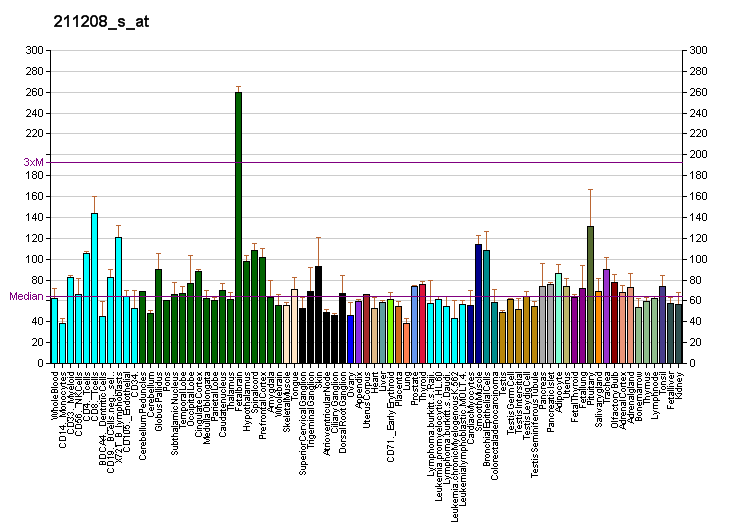
RNA expression pattern
Bgee	Human / Mouse (ortholog); Top expressed in: buccal mucosa cell; hair follicle; duodenum; jejunal mucosa; pancreatic ductal cell; optic nerve; Achilles tendon; ganglionic eminence; ventricular zone; superior vestibular nucleus / Top expressed in: genital tubercle; Ileal epithelium; tail of embryo; Rostral migratory stream; condyle; conjunctival fornix; fossa; trigeminal ganglion; Paneth cell; ganglionic eminence; More reference expression data
BioGPS	More reference expression data
Gene ontology
Molecular function	transferase activity; nucleotide binding; protein kinase activity; guanylate kinase activity; calmodulin binding; kinase activity; protein serine/threonine kinase activity; neurexin family protein binding; protein binding; ATP binding
Cellular component	cytoplasm; nuclear lamina; vesicle; cytosol; membrane; focal adhesion; nuclear matrix; plasma membrane; synapse; basolateral plasma membrane; nucleolus; ciliary membrane; actin cytoskeleton; presynaptic membrane; nucleus; basement membrane; cell-cell junction; Schaffer collateral - CA1 synapse
Biological process	negative regulation of cellular response to growth factor stimulus; negative regulation of keratinocyte proliferation; phosphorylation; calcium ion import; negative regulation of cell-matrix adhesion; protein phosphorylation; positive regulation of calcium ion import; cell adhesion; negative regulation of wound healing; neurotransmitter secretion; positive regulation of transcription by RNA polymerase II; GMP metabolic process; GDP metabolic process; regulation of synaptic vesicle exocytosis
Sources:Amigo / QuickGO
Orthologs
Databases	NCBI: entry; OMA: entry
Species	Human	Mouse
Entrez	8573	12361
Ensembl	ENSG00000147044	ENSMUSG00000031012
UniProt	O14936	O70589
RefSeq (mRNA)	NM_001126054; NM_001126055; NM_003688; NM_001367721	NM_001284503; NM_001284504; NM_001284505; NM_009806
RefSeq (protein)	NP_001119526; NP_001119527; NP_003679; NP_001354650	NP_001271432; NP_001271433; NP_001271434; NP_033936
Location (UCSC)	Chr X: 41.51 – 41.92 Mb	Chr X: 13.38 – 13.72 Mb
PubMed search
- Wikidata
View/Edit Human	View/Edit Mouse

Peripheral plasma membrane protein CASK is a protein that in humans is encoded by the CASK gene. This gene is also known by several other names: CMG 2 (CAMGUK protein 2), calcium/calmodulin-dependent serine protein kinase 3 and membrane-associated guanylate kinase 2. CASK gene mutations are the cause of XL-ID with or without nystagmus and MICPCH, an X-linked neurological disorder.

== Gene ==
This gene is located on the short arm of the X chromosome (Xp11.4). It is 404,253 bases in length and lies on the Crick (minus) strand. The encoded protein has 926 amino acids with a predicted molecular weight of 105,123 daltons.

== Function ==
This protein is a multidomain scaffolding protein with a role in synaptic transmembrane protein anchoring and ion channel trafficking. It interacts with the transcription factor TBR1 and binds to several cell-surface proteins including neurexins and syndecans.

== Clinical importance ==
This gene has been implicated in X-linked intellectual disability, including specifically intellectual developmental disorder and microcephaly with pontine and cerebellar hypoplasia. The role of CASK in disease is primarily associated with a loss of function (under expression) of the CASK gene as a result of a deletion, missense or splice mutation. It appears that mutations in the gene lead to diminished amounts of the protein being coded. As a result, CASK is unable to form complexes with other proteins leading to a cascade of events. Research has shown there is significant down-regulation of the genes involved in pre-synaptic development and of CASK protein interactors.

Males affected by CASK variants tend to have more severe symptoms than females due to the X-linked nature of the disease. These genetic issues are often fatal in the womb for male embryos or else lead to infant mortality. Females with CASK mutations have variable phenotypes with moderate to severe intellectual disability. CASK missense mutations and some splice mutations can lead to the milder neurodevelopmental phenotype.

CASK related disorders are mainly found in girls. The prevalence is unknown but generally thought to be below 400 cases worldwide. Patients are often born healthy but within the first few months of life show progressive microcephaly. Although there can be prenatal deceleration of head circumference growth, the majority of cases will not be diagnosed according to current recommendations for fetal CNS routine assessment.

The exact mode of pathology is not clear, but evidence from mice models indicates CASK deficiency in neurones causes the following effects:

- reduced levels of associated proteins such as Mint1 and neurexin
- Higher levels of Neuroligin 1
- Increased glutamate release at synapses and reduced GABA release affecting the E/I balance in maturing neural circuits
- Down-regulation of GluN2B resulting in disruption of synaptic E/I balance

Even slight changes in CASK expression in humans leads to dysregulation of the formation of presynapses, especially in inhibitory neurones.

== Interactions ==
CASK has been shown to interact with:

- KCNJ4
- APBA1
- ATP2B4
- CINAP and TBR1
- DLG1
- DLG4
- F11 receptor
- ID1
- KCNJ12
- LIN7A
- Nephrin
- Parkin (ligase)
- RPH3A
- SDC2

=== External links ===
- Project CASK - A non-profit based in the United States driving research breakthroughs to treat and cure CASK-related disorders, including MICPCH. Project CASK is supporting the only ongoing gene replacement therapy study for CASK disorders and a study for a potential small molecule treatment, and other critical studies for therapeutic development.
- CASK Research Foundation - A non-profit based in the UK for research, information and support into CASK related disorders including MICPCH
- Angelina CASK Neurological Research Foundation - A non-profit based in Australia creating research grants for research into CASK gene related disorders.
