= LIN7A =

Protein-coding gene in humans

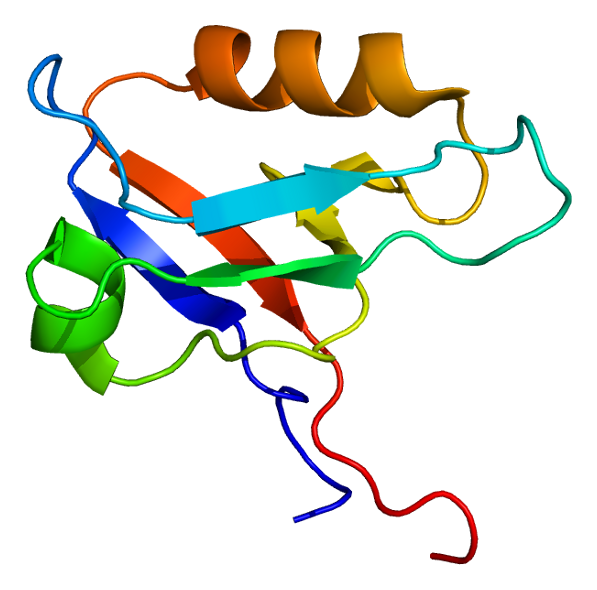

Identifiers
- Aliases: LIN7A, LIN-7A, LIN7, MALS-1, TIP-33, VELI1, lin-7 homolog A, crumbs cell polarity complex component, MALS1
- External IDs: OMIM: 603380; MGI: 2135609; GeneCards: LIN7A

Gene location (Human)
Chr.	Chromosome 12 (human)
Band	12q21.31	Start	80,792,520 bp
Band	12q21.31	End	80,937,934 bp

Gene location (Mouse)
Chr.	Chromosome 10 (mouse)
Band	10|10 D1	Start	107,107,547 bp
Band	10|10 D1	End	107,257,335 bp
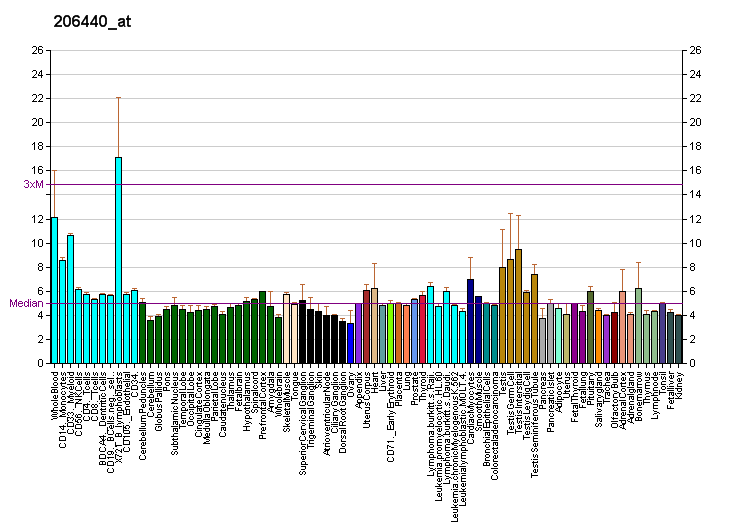
RNA expression pattern
Bgee	Human / Mouse (ortholog); Top expressed in: Brodmann area 23; endothelial cell; middle temporal gyrus; retinal pigment epithelium; primary visual cortex; trabecular bone; blood; cerebellar cortex; cerebellar hemisphere; entorhinal cortex / Top expressed in: lobe of cerebellum; seminiferous tubule; cerebellar vermis; lateral septal nucleus; lumbar spinal ganglion; nucleus accumbens; neural layer of retina; primary motor cortex; inferior colliculi; superior cervical ganglion; More reference expression data
BioGPS	More reference expression data
Gene ontology
Molecular function	protein binding; L27 domain binding
Cellular component	postsynaptic membrane; membrane; postsynaptic density; cell-cell junction; bicellular tight junction; plasma membrane; cell junction; basolateral plasma membrane; neuron projection; extracellular exosome; presynapse; synapse; MPP7-DLG1-LIN7 complex; intracellular anatomical structure
Biological process	protein localization to basolateral plasma membrane; maintenance of epithelial cell apical/basal polarity; protein transport; synaptic vesicle transport; inner ear development; neurotransmitter secretion; exocytosis; transport; protein-containing complex assembly
Sources:Amigo / QuickGO
Orthologs
Databases	NCBI: entry; OMA: entry
Species	Human	Mouse
Entrez	8825	108030
Ensembl	ENSG00000111052	ENSMUSG00000019906
UniProt	O14910	Q8JZS0
RefSeq (mRNA)	NM_004664; NM_001324423	NM_001033223; NM_001039354; NM_001284329
RefSeq (protein)	NP_001311352; NP_004655	NP_001028395; NP_001034443; NP_001271258
Location (UCSC)	Chr 12: 80.79 – 80.94 Mb	Chr 10: 107.11 – 107.26 Mb
PubMed search
- Wikidata
View/Edit Human	View/Edit Mouse

Lin-7 homolog A is a protein that in humans is encoded by the LIN7A gene.

== Interactions ==
LIN7A has been shown to interact with:

- CASK,
- DLG1, and
- KCNJ12.
