= Intellectual developmental disorder and microcephaly with pontine and cerebellar hypoplasia =

Rare X-linked dominant genetic disorder

- Other names: X-linked intellectual disability - microcephaly - pontocerebellar hypoplasia
- This condition is inherited in an X-linked dominant manner.
- Specialty: Medical genetics

Intellectual developmental disorder and microcephaly with pontine and cerebellar hypoplasia, also known as Intellectual developmental disorder and microcephaly with pontine and cerebellar hypoplasia (MICPCH) mental retardation, X-linked, syndromic, Najm type (MRXSNA); X-linked intellectual deficit, Najm type; intellectual developmental disorder, X-linked, syndromic, Najm type; X-linked intellectual disability–microcephaly–pontocerebellar hypoplasia syndrome; and by variations of these terms – is a rare X-linked dominant genetic disorder of infants characterised by intellectual disability and pontocerebellar hypoplasia. It usually affects females; many males die before birth or not long after.

The disorder is associated with a mutation in the CASK gene. As with the vast majority of genetic disorders, there is no known cure to MICPCH.

The following values seem to be aberrant in children with CASK gene defects: lactate, pyruvate, 2-ketoglutarate, adipic acid and suberic acid, which seems to backup the proposal that CASK affects mitochondrial function. It is also speculated that phosphoinositide 3-kinase in the inositol metabolism is impacted in the disease, causing folic acid metabolization problems.

== Signs and symptoms ==
The symptoms of MICPCH include progressive microcephaly, hypotonia, intellectual disability, possible optic atrophy, motor disabilities, brainstem/cerebellar hypoplasia (PCH), and, in forty percent of cases, epilepsy. Development of gross motor skills, such as sitting, standing, and walking, is severely delayed, along with restricted fine motor skills. Some affected individuals can walk with assistance, but most MICPCH patients rely on wheelchairs. Additional features include disrupted sleep; sensorineural hearing loss, feeding difficulties; and gastrointestinal problems, including constipation and gastroesophageal reflux.

MICPCH in males may occur with or without severe epileptic encephalopathy (Ohtahara syndrome, West syndrome, or early myoclonic epilepsy) in addition to severe-to-profound developmental delay. When seizures are present, they occur early and may be intractable. Prognosis is poor for males with this condition. The differences in phenotype between girls and boys arise simply due to the fact that in boys there is only one X-chromosome and hence one CASK gene. This results in males with MICPCH having no functioning CASK protein present in their brains whilst females will have approximately 50% of healthy levels.

Infantile/epileptic spasms appears to be a prevalent seizure type within individuals suffering from MICPCH. It appears that females are more likely to have late onset epileptic spasms whilst males are prone to early onset spasms (infantile spasms).

== Cause ==
MICPCH is caused by pathogenic variants in the CASK gene. This gene provides instructions for making calcium/calmodulin dependent serine protein kinase (CASK), a protein that is essential for brain function. CASK, being a multidomain protein, is found to interact with multiple molecules including neurexin, syndecan and Mint1, playing an important synaptic function, and also possibly plays a role in cell proliferation and cell polarization. In addition, CASK is now thought to be involved in neurotransmission. CASK is widely expressed in the brain and its full role in brain function is still not clear.

== Diagnosis ==
MICPCH is diagnosed following an MRI displaying pontocerebellar hypoplasia and positive genetic testing for a pathogenic or likely-pathogenic mutation of the CASK gene. Initial testing tends to occur following a diagnosis of microcephaly in the first year of life. A diagnostic ICD-10 code has been assigned to MICPCH: Q04.3.

== Inheritance ==
The CASK gene is located on the X chromosome and are therefore inherited in an X-linked manner. Nearly all known pathogenic mutations are de novo, rather than being inherited from an affected mother or father. A broader spectrum of phenotypes are being diagnosed, with cases of inheritance noted. Risk to the family members of a proband with a CASK disorder depends on the phenotype (i.e., MICPCH or XLID ± nystagmus) in the proband.

== Treatment ==
MICPH has no specific treatment and no cure. Antiseizure medications (ASMs) are used to manage seizures; however, in most cases, control is partial or transient. Commonly used ASMs include valproic acid, clobazam, vigabatrin and Levetiracetam. There is no data for the efficacy and safety of ASMs in MICPCH. Currently, there are no specifically approved therapeutics for the symptoms of MICPCH. Medications to control GI and sleep disturbances are often prescribed and children are given feeding tubes to ensure adequate fluids and nourishment. Therapies, including physical, occupational and speech therapy are recommended.

== Prognosis ==
Males with CASK-null variants are unlikely to live past infancy. It is believed this is due to thinning of the brain stem which leads to central respiratory failure, airway infection, and pneumonia. The prognosis for females is variable and not fully described. Fatality in teens and early adult hood has occurred. Early onset of regular therapies and intensive therapies has been known to aid development.

== History ==
The CASK protein was first identified in 1996. The human CASK gene was first described as a candidate locus for X-linked optic atrophy in 1998. The first patient was described in literature in 2007 and an association between a CASK gene mutation and MICPCH confirmed in 2008.

== Support ==
In the United States, the non-profit organization Project CASK is activating research, engaging affected families, and funding cutting-edge science to develop treatments and a cure for CASK gene disorders, including MICPCH. Project CASK is supporting the only ongoing gene replacement therapy study for CASK disorders and a study for a potential small molecule treatment, and other critical studies for therapeutic development.

The non-profit organisation CASK Research UK provides family support and research grants into MICPCH and its associated conditions.

== See also ==
- Pontocerebellar hypoplasia
- X-linked intellectual disability
- CASK
