= ATP2B4 =

Protein-coding gene in humans

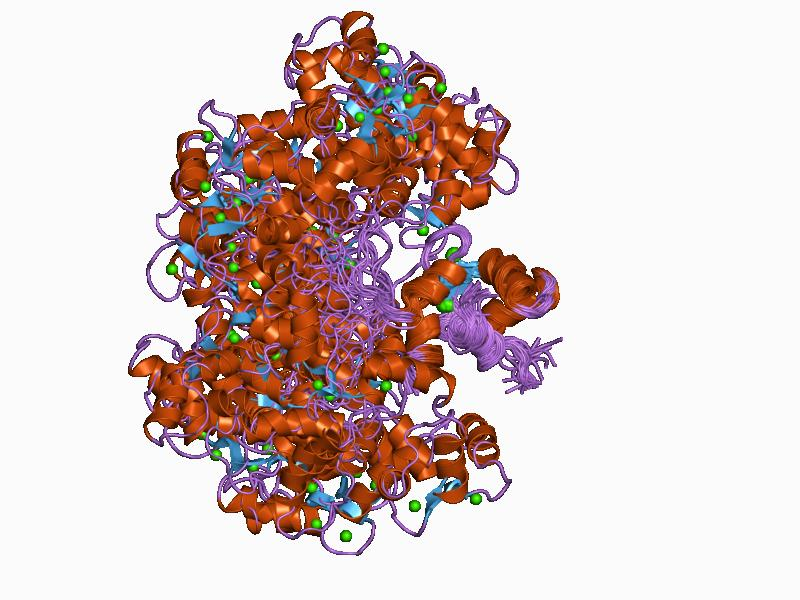

Identifiers
- Aliases: ATP2B4, ATP2B2, MXRA1, PMCA4, PMCA4b, PMCA4x, ATPase plasma membrane Ca2+ transporting 4
- External IDs: OMIM: 108732; MGI: 88111; GeneCards: ATP2B4
Available structures
PDB	Ortholog search: PDBe RCSB
PDB	List of PDB id codes 1CFF, 2KNE
Enzyme activity
EC #	BRENDA	ExPASy	KEGG	MetaCyc
7.2.2.10	↗	↗	↗	↗

Gene location (Human)
Chr.	Chromosome 1 (human)
Band	1q32.1	Start	203,626,787 bp
Band	1q32.1	End	203,744,081 bp

Gene location (Mouse)
Chr.	Chromosome 1 (mouse)
Band	1 E4|1 57.95 cM	Start	133,627,195 bp
Band	1 E4|1 57.95 cM	End	133,728,779 bp
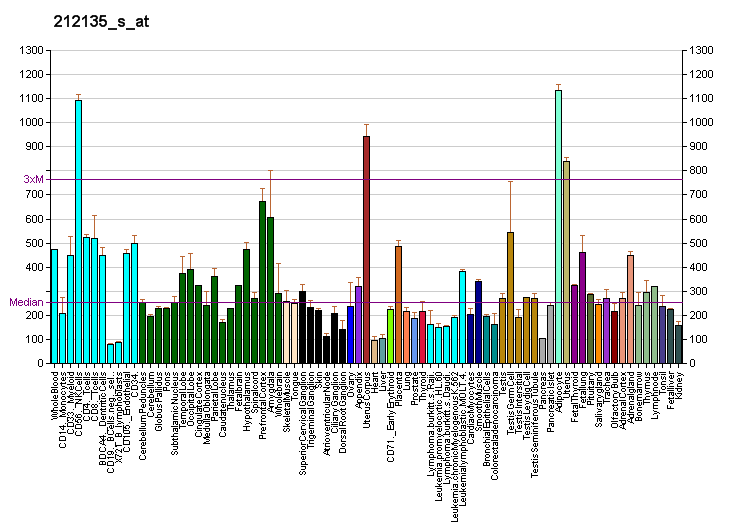

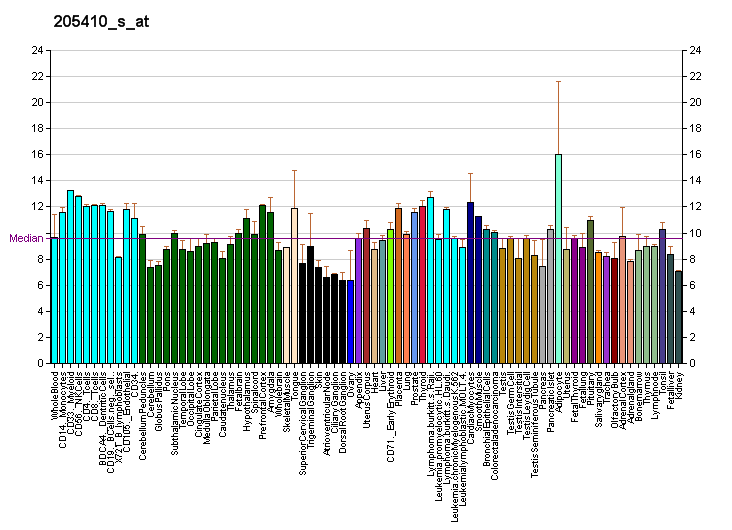

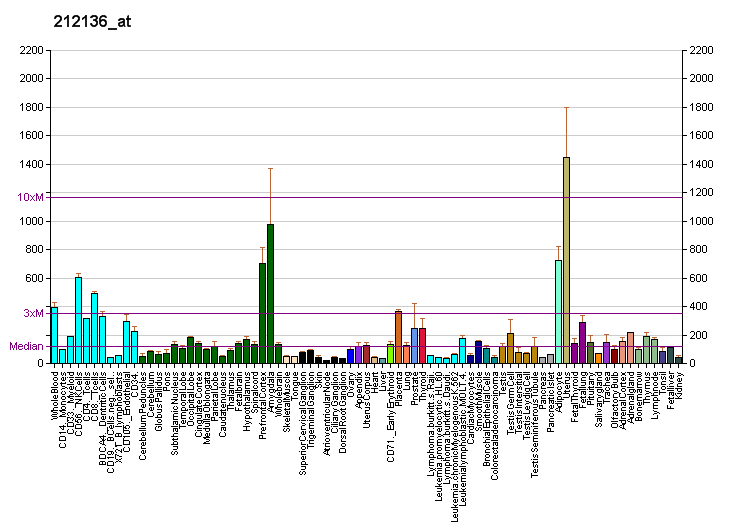
RNA expression pattern
Bgee	Human / Mouse (ortholog); Top expressed in: saphenous vein; tail of epididymis; body of uterus; myometrium; epithelium of colon; smooth muscle tissue; left uterine tube; muscle layer of sigmoid colon; superficial temporal artery; skin of arm / Top expressed in: spermatocyte; superior frontal gyrus; primary visual cortex; dentate gyrus of hippocampal formation granule cell; lip; spermatid; Rostral migratory stream; esophagus; genital tubercle; ascending aorta; More reference expression data
BioGPS	More reference expression data
Gene ontology
Molecular function	nucleotide binding; PDZ domain binding; sodium channel regulator activity; nitric-oxide synthase binding; scaffold protein binding; metal ion binding; calmodulin binding; nitric-oxide synthase inhibitor activity; protein binding; protein phosphatase 2B binding; ATP binding; hydrolase activity; P-type calcium transporter activity; protein kinase binding
Cellular component	integral component of membrane; cell projection; membrane; intracellular membrane-bounded organelle; T-tubule; plasma membrane; integral component of plasma membrane; sperm flagellum; sperm principal piece; basolateral plasma membrane; Z discdkac; caveola; neuron projection; sarcolemma; cilium; motile cilium; protein-containing complex; glutamatergic synapse; integral component of presynaptic active zone membrane
Biological process	negative regulation of nitric oxide mediated signal transduction; flagellated sperm motility; regulation of cardiac conduction; negative regulation of nitric-oxide synthase activity; negative regulation of calcineurin-NFAT signaling cascade; negative regulation of citrulline biosynthetic process; negative regulation of peptidyl-cysteine S-nitrosylation; regulation of transcription by RNA polymerase II; calcium ion import across plasma membrane; response to hydrostatic pressure; cellular calcium ion homeostasis; ion transport; positive regulation of peptidyl-serine phosphorylation; cellular response to epinephrine stimulus; ion transmembrane transport; negative regulation of nitric oxide biosynthetic process; calcium ion transmembrane transport; calcium ion transmembrane import into cytosol; spermatogenesis; positive regulation of cAMP-dependent protein kinase activity; regulation of cell cycle G1/S phase transition; regulation of sodium ion transmembrane transport; calcium ion export; hippocampus development; negative regulation of arginine catabolic process; neural retina development; negative regulation of the force of heart contraction; calcium ion transport; negative regulation of cardiac muscle hypertrophy in response to stress; transport; regulation of cytosolic calcium ion concentration; negative regulation of adenylate cyclase-activating adrenergic receptor signaling pathway involved in heart process; urinary bladder smooth muscle contraction; cellular response to acetylcholine
Sources:Amigo / QuickGO
Orthologs
Databases	NCBI: entry; OMA: entry
Species	Human	Mouse
Entrez	493	381290
Ensembl	ENSG00000058668	ENSMUSG00000026463
UniProt	P23634	Q6Q477
RefSeq (mRNA)	NM_001684; NM_001001396; NM_001365783; NM_001365784	NM_001167949; NM_213616
RefSeq (protein)	NP_001001396; NP_001675; NP_001352712; NP_001352713	NP_001161421; NP_998781
Location (UCSC)	Chr 1: 203.63 – 203.74 Mb	Chr 1: 133.63 – 133.73 Mb
PubMed search
- Wikidata
View/Edit Human	View/Edit Mouse

Plasma membrane calcium-transporting ATPase 4 is an enzyme that in humans is encoded by the ATP2B4 gene.

The protein encoded by this gene belongs to the family of P-type primary ion transport ATPases characterized by the formation of an aspartyl phosphate intermediate during the reaction cycle. These enzymes remove bivalent calcium ions from eukaryotic cells against very large concentration gradients and play a critical role in intracellular calcium homeostasis. The mammalian plasma membrane calcium ATPase isoforms are encoded by at least four separate genes and the diversity of these enzymes is further increased by alternative splicing of transcripts. The expression of different isoforms and splice variants is regulated in a developmental, tissue- and cell type-specific manner, suggesting that these pumps are functionally adapted to the physiological needs of particular cells and tissues. This gene encodes the plasma membrane calcium ATPase isoform 4. Alternatively spliced transcript variants encoding different isoforms have been identified.

== Interactions ==
ATP2B4 has been shown to interact with CASK.
