= MPP2 =

Protein-coding gene in the species Homo sapiens

Identifiers
- Aliases: MPP2, DLG2, membrane palmitoylated protein 2, MAGUK p55 scaffold protein 2
- External IDs: OMIM: 600723; MGI: 1858257; GeneCards: MPP2
Available structures
PDB	Ortholog search: PDBe RCSB
PDB	List of PDB id codes 2E7K

Gene location (Human)
Chr.	Chromosome 17 (human)
Band	17q21.31	Start	43,875,357 bp
Band	17q21.31	End	43,909,711 bp

Gene location (Mouse)
Chr.	Chromosome 11 (mouse)
Band	11 D|11 65.48 cM	Start	101,947,841 bp
Band	11 D|11 65.48 cM	End	101,979,341 bp
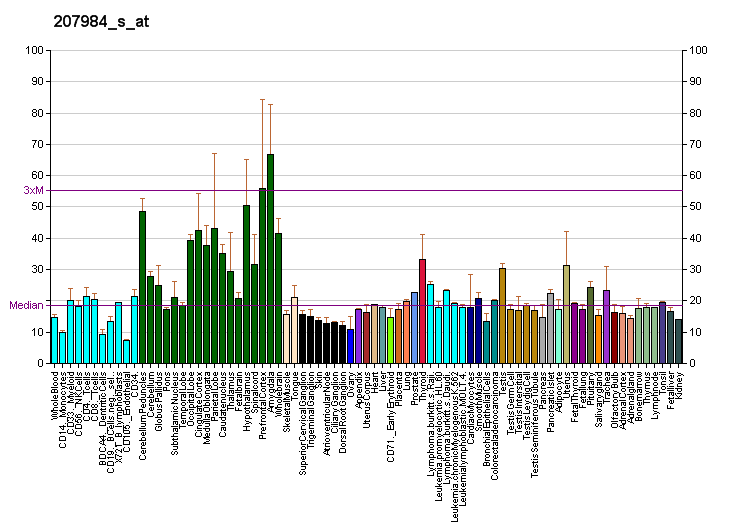

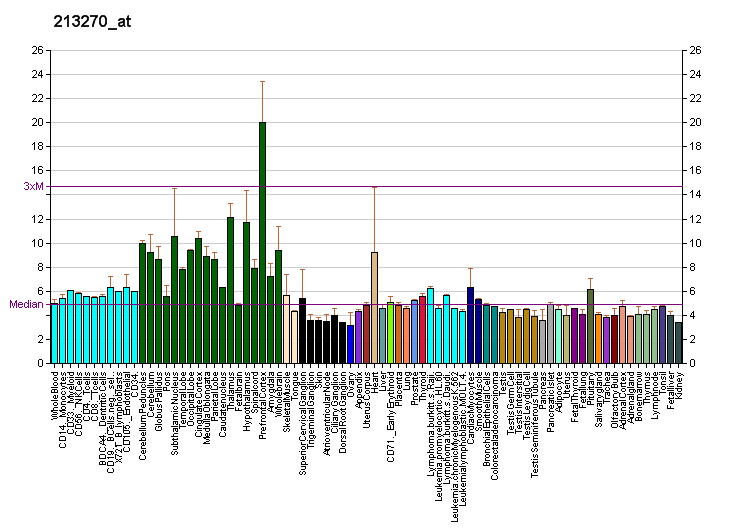
RNA expression pattern
Bgee	Human / Mouse (ortholog); Top expressed in: C1 segment; prefrontal cortex; right hemisphere of cerebellum; right frontal lobe; hypothalamus; Brodmann area 9; cingulate gyrus; anterior cingulate cortex; amygdala; substantia nigra / Top expressed in: dentate gyrus of hippocampal formation granule cell; primary visual cortex; subiculum; superior frontal gyrus; piriform cortex; dorsomedial hypothalamic nucleus; neural layer of retina; superior colliculus; primary motor cortex; anterior amygdaloid area; More reference expression data
BioGPS	More reference expression data
Gene ontology
Molecular function	guanylate kinase activity; protein binding
Cellular component	integral component of plasma membrane; postsynaptic density; dendrite membrane; dendritic spine; dendritic shaft; cytoplasm; cytoskeleton; plasma membrane; membrane; dendrite; dendritic spine membrane; cell projection
Biological process	signal transduction; GMP metabolic process; GDP metabolic process; protein homooligomerization; excitatory postsynaptic potential; long-term potentiation
Sources:Amigo / QuickGO
Orthologs
Databases	NCBI: entry; OMA: entry
Species	Human	Mouse
Entrez	4355	50997
Ensembl	ENSG00000108852	ENSMUSG00000017314
UniProt	Q14168	Q9WV34
RefSeq (mRNA)	NM_001278370; NM_001278371; NM_001278372; NM_001278373; NM_001278374 NM_001278375; NM_001278376; NM_001278381; NM_005374	NM_016695; NM_001356324
RefSeq (protein)	NP_001265299; NP_001265300; NP_001265301; NP_001265302; NP_001265303 NP_001265304; NP_001265305; NP_001265310; NP_005365	NP_057904; NP_001343253
Location (UCSC)	Chr 17: 43.88 – 43.91 Mb	Chr 11: 101.95 – 101.98 Mb
PubMed search
- Wikidata
View/Edit Human	View/Edit Mouse

MAGUK p55 subfamily member 2 is a protein that in humans is encoded by the MPP2 gene.

Palmitoylated membrane protein 2 is a member of a family of membrane-associated proteins termed MAGUKs (membrane-associated guanylate kinase homologs). MAGUKs interact with the cytoskeleton and regulate cell proliferation, signaling pathways, and intracellular junctions. Palmitoylated membrane protein 2 contains a conserved sequence, called the SH3 (src homology 3) motif, found in several other proteins that associate with the cytoskeleton and are suspected to play important roles in signal transduction.
