= LIN7C =

Protein-coding gene in the species Homo sapiens

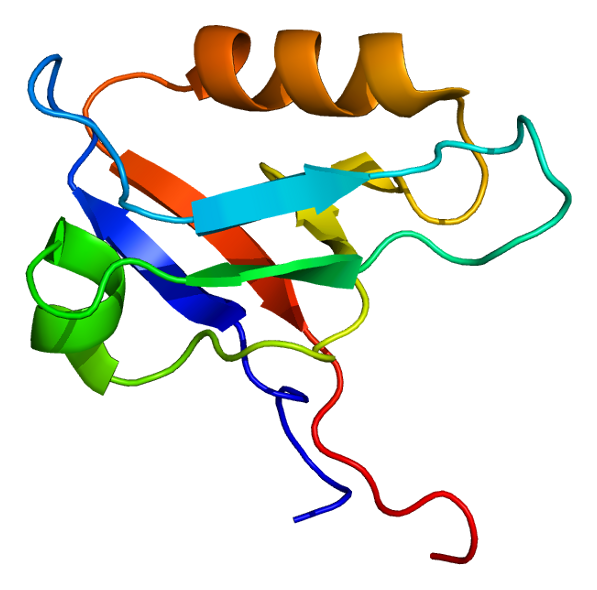

Identifiers
- Aliases: LIN7C, LIN-7-C, LIN-7C, MALS-3, MALS3, VELI3, lin-7 homolog C, crumbs cell polarity complex component
- External IDs: OMIM: 612332; MGI: 1330839; GeneCards: LIN7C
Available structures
PDB	Ortholog search: PDBe RCSB
PDB	List of PDB id codes 3LRA

Gene location (Human)
Chr.	Chromosome 11 (human)
Band	11p14.1	Start	27,494,418 bp
Band	11p14.1	End	27,506,769 bp

Gene location (Mouse)
Chr.	Chromosome 2 (mouse)
Band	2 E3|2 56.65 cM	Start	109,721,198 bp
Band	2 E3|2 56.65 cM	End	109,731,348 bp
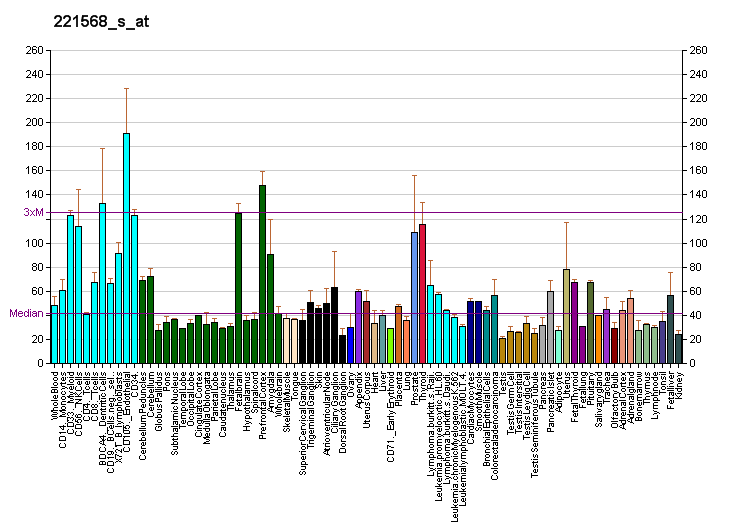

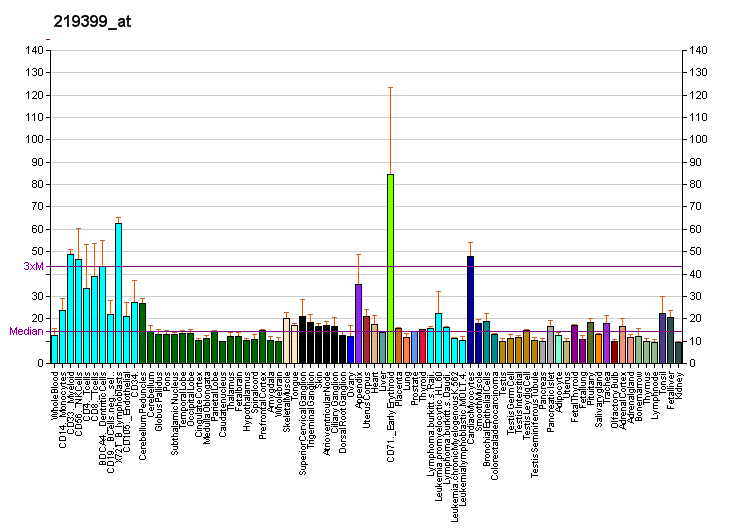
RNA expression pattern
Bgee	Human / Mouse (ortholog); Top expressed in: Epithelium of choroid plexus; germinal epithelium; epithelium of nasopharynx; retinal pigment epithelium; tibia; oral cavity; Brodmann area 23; visceral pleura; parietal pleura; kidney tubule / Top expressed in: olfactory epithelium; lobe of cerebellum; medial ganglionic eminence; median eminence; pineal gland; cerebellar vermis; zygote; tail of embryo; dentate gyrus; superior cervical ganglion; More reference expression data
BioGPS	More reference expression data
Gene ontology
Molecular function	protein domain specific binding; cytoskeletal protein binding; L27 domain binding; PDZ domain binding
Cellular component	cytoplasm; postsynaptic membrane; postsynaptic density; membrane; cell-cell junction; bicellular tight junction; plasma membrane; MPP7-DLG1-LIN7 complex; cell junction; basolateral plasma membrane; neuron projection; presynapse; synapse; glutamatergic synapse
Biological process	protein localization to basolateral plasma membrane; maintenance of epithelial cell apical/basal polarity; protein transport; morphogenesis of an epithelial sheet; neurotransmitter secretion; exocytosis
Sources:Amigo / QuickGO
Orthologs
Databases	NCBI: entry; OMA: entry
Species	Human	Mouse
Entrez	55327	22343
Ensembl	ENSG00000148943	ENSMUSG00000027162
UniProt	Q9NUP9	O88952
RefSeq (mRNA)	NM_018362	NM_011699
RefSeq (protein)	NP_060832	NP_035829
Location (UCSC)	Chr 11: 27.49 – 27.51 Mb	Chr 2: 109.72 – 109.73 Mb
PubMed search
- Wikidata
View/Edit Human	View/Edit Mouse

Lin-7 homolog C is a protein that in humans is encoded by the LIN7C gene.

== Interactions ==
LIN7C has been shown to interact with:

- DLG1,
- KCNJ12, and
- KCNJ4.
