= CCS (gene) =

Protein-coding gene in humans

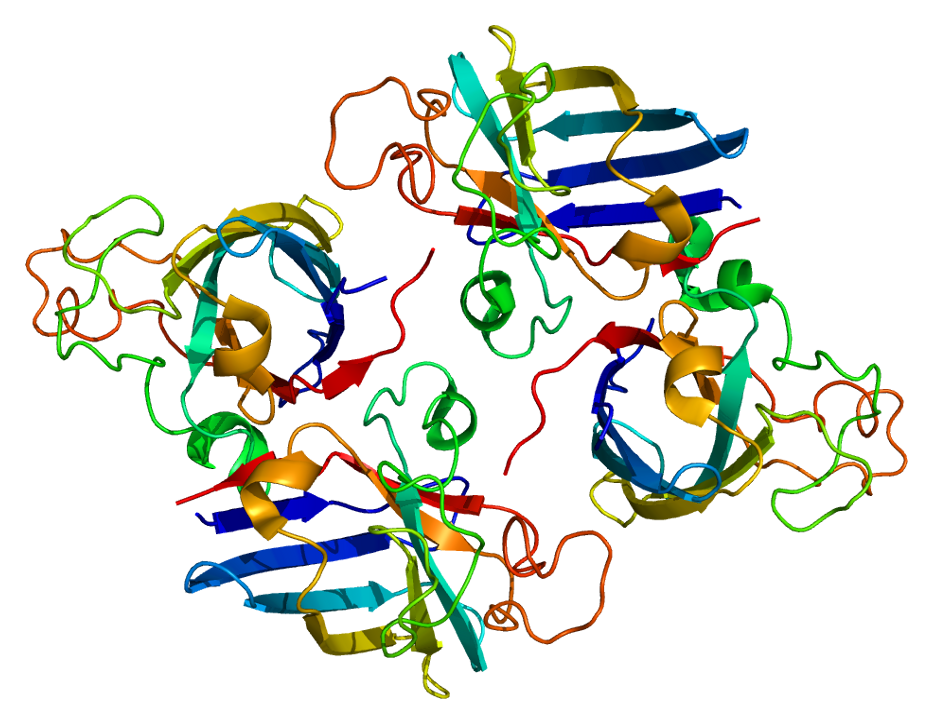

Identifiers
- Aliases: CCS, copper chaperone for superoxide dismutase
- External IDs: OMIM: 603864; MGI: 1333783; GeneCards: CCS
Available structures
PDB	Ortholog search: PDBe RCSB
PDB	List of PDB id codes 1DO5, 2CRL, 2RSQ

Gene location (Human)
Chr.	Chromosome 11 (human)
Band	11q13.2	Start	66,593,153 bp
Band	11q13.2	End	66,606,019 bp

Gene location (Mouse)
Chr.	Chromosome 19 (mouse)
Band	19 A|19 4.11 cM	Start	4,875,394 bp
Band	19 A|19 4.11 cM	End	4,889,360 bp
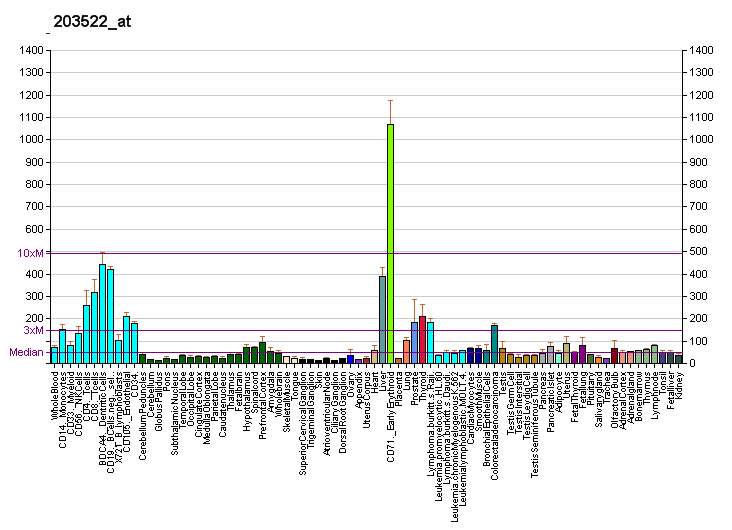
RNA expression pattern
Bgee	Human / Mouse (ortholog); Top expressed in: right lobe of liver; right ovary; left ovary; muscle layer of sigmoid colon; right adrenal cortex; left adrenal cortex; apex of heart; granulocyte; anterior pituitary; right testis / Top expressed in: saccule; right kidney; left lobe of liver; otic placode; yolk sac; otic vesicle; proximal tubule; human kidney; utricle; adrenal gland; More reference expression data
BioGPS	More reference expression data
Gene ontology
Molecular function	protein-disulfide reductase activity; zinc ion binding; metal ion binding; protein binding; copper ion binding; cadherin binding; superoxide dismutase copper chaperone activity; superoxide dismutase activity
Cellular component	cytosol; nucleus; cytoplasm; extracellular space
Biological process	positive regulation of oxidoreductase activity; protein maturation by copper ion transfer; metal ion transport; superoxide metabolic process; cellular response to oxidative stress; removal of superoxide radicals
Sources:Amigo / QuickGO
Orthologs
Databases	NCBI: entry; OMA: entry
Species	Human	Mouse
Entrez	9973	12460
Ensembl	ENSG00000173992	ENSMUSG00000034108
UniProt	O14618	Q9WU84
RefSeq (mRNA)	NM_005125	NM_016892
RefSeq (protein)	NP_005116	NP_058588
Location (UCSC)	Chr 11: 66.59 – 66.61 Mb	Chr 19: 4.88 – 4.89 Mb
PubMed search
- Wikidata
View/Edit Human	View/Edit Mouse

Copper chaperone for superoxide dismutase is a metalloprotein that is responsible for the delivery of Cu to superoxide dismutase (SOD1). CCS is a 54kDa protein that is present in mammals and most eukaryotes including yeast. The structure of CCS is composed of three distinct domains that are necessary for its function. Although CCS is important for many organisms, there are CCS independent pathways for SOD1, and many species lack CCS all together, such as C. elegans. In humans the protein is encoded by the CCS gene.

== Structure and function ==
CCS is composed of three domains. Domain I is located on the N-terminus and contains the MXCXXC Cu binding sequence. It has been determined to be necessary for function of CCS but its specific role is currently unknown. The structure of domain II greatly resembles that of SOD1 which allows it to perform the function of binding to SOD1. Domain III contains a CXC Cu binding motif and performs the Cu insertion and subsequent disulfide oxidation of SOD1.

When CCS docks to SOD1, cysteine 244 of CCS and 57 of SOD1 form a disulfide linkage. This disulfide bond is then transferred to form a disulfide bridge between cysteine 57 and 146 of SOD1. CCS's catalytic oxidation of SOD1's disulfide bridge can only be performed in the presence of oxygen. Furthermore, the disulfide linkage of SOD1 can be performed without the presence of CCS but requires oxygen and is much slower. Additionally, CCS is proposed to help the proper folding of SOD1 by binding in the apo-state.

As well as SOD1, CCS (gene) has been shown to interact with APBA1.

== Localization ==
CCS is localized in the nucleus, cytosol, and mitochondrial intermembrane space. CCS is imported to the mitochondria by Mia40 and Erv1 disulfide relay system. The cysteine 64 of CCS Domain I generates a disulfide intermediate with Mia40. This disulfide bond is transferred to link cysteine 64 and 27 of CCS, stabilizing the protein in the mitochondrial intermembrane space where it delivers Cu to the Cu-less apo-SOD1.

== Role in copper homeostasis ==
In mammals cellular Cu levels are regulated by CCS's interaction with the 26S proteasome. During times of Cu excess CCS delivers Cu to XIAP and primes the complex for auto-ubiquitination and subsequent degradation. Expression of SOD1 is not modified by Cu availability but by CCS ability to deliver Cu. Knockouts of CCS (Δccs) show 70-90% decrease in SOD1 activity as well as increased expression of Cu binding proteins, namely, MT-I, MT-II, ATOX1, COX17, ATP7A to, presumably, reduce the amount of free Cu.

Cells with CCS mutants have been shown to display ALS like symptoms. Moreover, SOD1 mutants that have altered interactions with CCS have been shown to display misfolding and aggregation.
