= LIN7B =

Protein-coding gene in humans

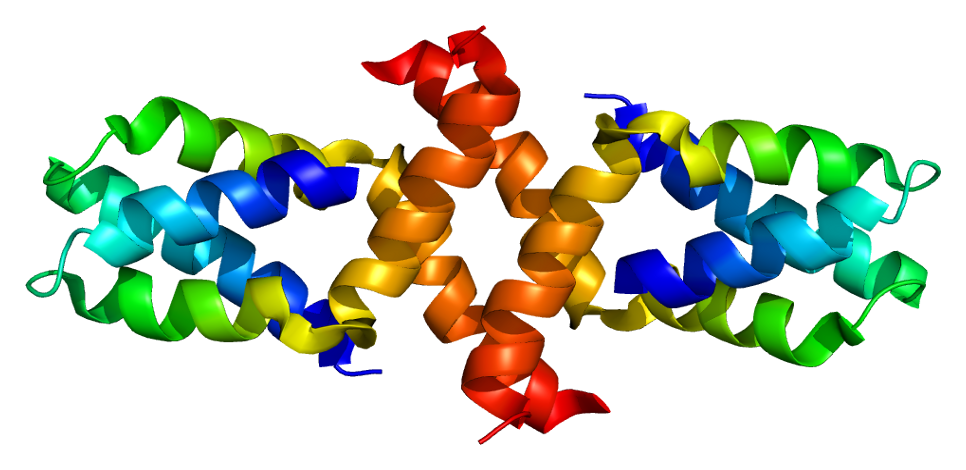

Identifiers
- Aliases: LIN7B, LIN-7B, MALS-2, MALS2, VELI2, lin-7 homolog B, crumbs cell polarity complex component
- External IDs: OMIM: 612331; MGI: 1330858; GeneCards: LIN7B
Available structures
PDB	Ortholog search: PDBe RCSB
PDB	List of PDB id codes 2DKR

Gene location (Human)
Chr.	Chromosome 19 (human)
Band	19q13.33	Start	49,114,324 bp
Band	19q13.33	End	49,118,460 bp

Gene location (Mouse)
Chr.	Chromosome 7 (mouse)
Band	7|7 B3	Start	45,017,315 bp
Band	7|7 B3	End	45,020,007 bp
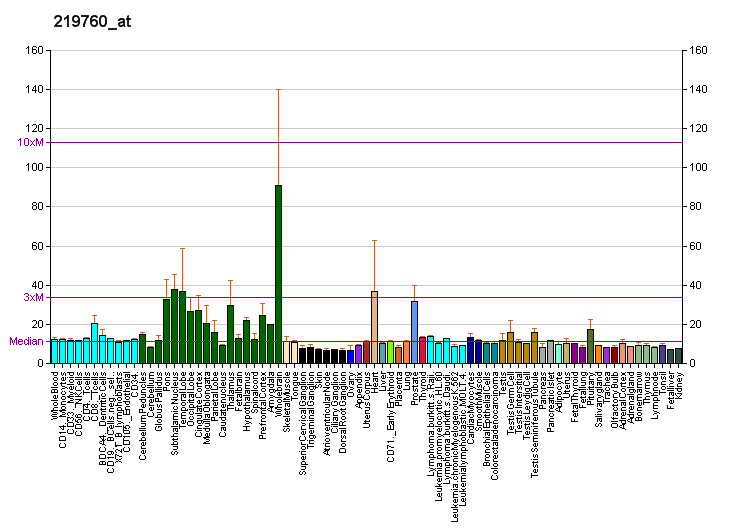
RNA expression pattern
Bgee	Human / Mouse (ortholog); Top expressed in: anterior cingulate cortex; endothelial cell; right frontal lobe; nucleus accumbens; Brodmann area 9; anterior pituitary; prefrontal cortex; amygdala; caudate nucleus; putamen / Top expressed in: facial motor nucleus; motor neuron; superior frontal gyrus; dentate gyrus of hippocampal formation granule cell; primary visual cortex; substantia nigra; barrel cortex; primary motor cortex; anterior amygdaloid area; Region I of hippocampus proper; More reference expression data
BioGPS	More reference expression data
Gene ontology
Molecular function	PDZ domain binding; protein domain specific binding; L27 domain binding; protein binding
Cellular component	postsynaptic membrane; postsynaptic density; membrane; cell-cell junction; bicellular tight junction; plasma membrane; cell junction; basolateral plasma membrane; neuron projection; presynapse; synapse; MPP7-DLG1-LIN7 complex
Biological process	protein localization to basolateral plasma membrane; maintenance of epithelial cell apical/basal polarity; protein transport; neurotransmitter secretion; exocytosis
Sources:Amigo / QuickGO
Orthologs
Databases	NCBI: entry; OMA: entry
Species	Human	Mouse
Entrez	64130	22342
Ensembl	ENSG00000104863	ENSMUSG00000003872
UniProt	Q9HAP6	O88951
RefSeq (mRNA)	NM_001308419; NM_022165	NM_011698
RefSeq (protein)	NP_001295348; NP_071448	NP_035828
Location (UCSC)	Chr 19: 49.11 – 49.12 Mb	Chr 7: 45.02 – 45.02 Mb
PubMed search
- Wikidata
View/Edit Human	View/Edit Mouse

Lin-7 homolog B is a protein that in humans is encoded by the LIN7B gene.

== Interactions ==
LIN7B has been shown to interact with:

- ACCN3,
- GRIN2B,
- KCNJ12 and
- KCNJ4.
