= DLG1 =

Protein-coding gene in the species Homo sapiens

Identifiers
- Aliases: DLG1, DLGH1, SAP-97, SAP97, dJ1061C18.1.1, hdlg, B130052P05Rik, E-dlg/SAP97, mKIAA4187, discs large homolog 1, scribble cell polarity complex component, discs large MAGUK scaffold protein 1
- External IDs: OMIM: 601014; MGI: 107231; GeneCards: DLG1
Available structures
PDB	Ortholog search: PDBe RCSB
PDB	List of PDB id codes 1PDR, 2M3M, 2OQS, 2X7Z, 3RL7, 3RL8, 3W9Y, 4AMH, 4G69

Gene location (Human)
Chr.	Chromosome 3 (human)
Band	3q29	Start	197,042,560 bp
Band	3q29	End	197,299,330 bp

Gene location (Mouse)
Chr.	Chromosome 16 (mouse)
Band	16 B2|16 22.4 cM	Start	31,482,261 bp
Band	16 B2|16 22.4 cM	End	31,693,947 bp
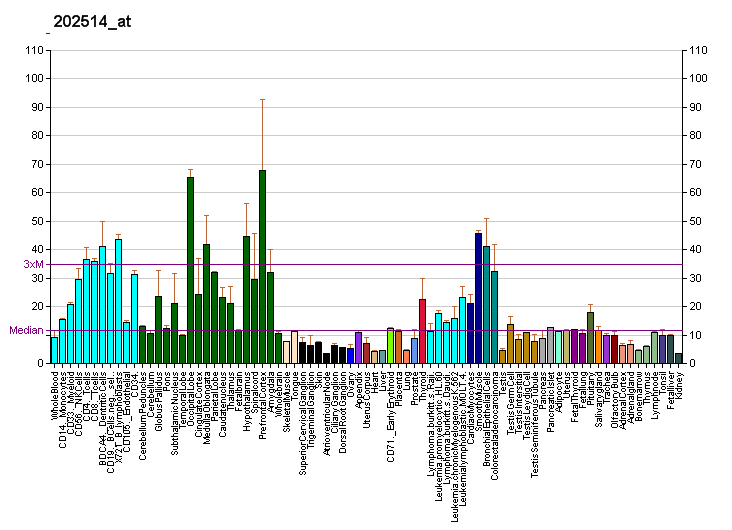

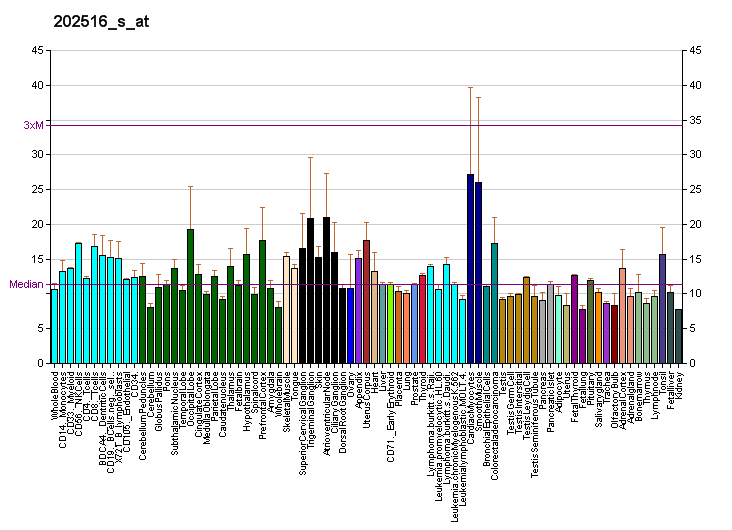

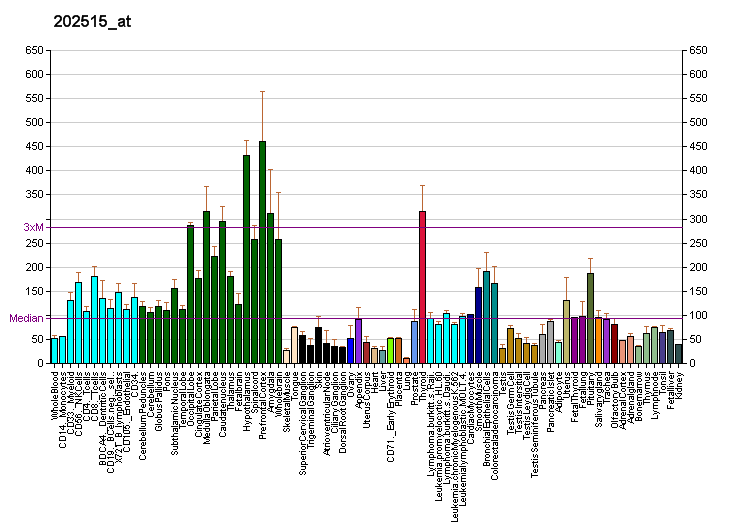
RNA expression pattern
Bgee	Human / Mouse (ortholog); Top expressed in: endothelial cell; corpus callosum; dorsal motor nucleus of vagus nerve; inferior olivary nucleus; inferior ganglion of vagus nerve; subthalamic nucleus; epithelium of colon; hair follicle; external globus pallidus; Brodmann area 23 / Top expressed in: tail of embryo; globus pallidus; medullary collecting duct; vestibular membrane of cochlear duct; primary motor cortex; conjunctival fornix; olfactory tubercle; Paneth cell; utricle; condyle; More reference expression data
BioGPS	More reference expression data
Gene ontology
Molecular function	phosphatase binding; phosphoprotein phosphatase activity; transmembrane transporter binding; cytoskeletal protein binding; protein C-terminus binding; ionotropic glutamate receptor binding; kinase binding; mitogen-activated protein kinase kinase binding; guanylate kinase activity; protein binding; molecular adaptor activity; protein kinase binding; L27 domain binding; ligand-gated ion channel activity; potassium channel regulator activity; cadherin binding; structural constituent of postsynaptic density
Cellular component	cytoplasm; cytosol; postsynaptic membrane; membrane; cell-cell junction; bicellular tight junction; node of Ranvier; synapse; perinuclear region of cytoplasm; cytoplasmic side of plasma membrane; microtubule; nucleus; cell projection membrane; membrane raft; ionotropic glutamate receptor complex; extracellular exosome; Golgi apparatus; lateral plasma membrane; intercalated disc; neuromuscular junction; myelin sheath abaxonal region; lateral loop; endoplasmic reticulum membrane; MPP7-DLG1-LIN7 complex; sarcolemma; postsynaptic density; cell junction; basolateral plasma membrane; plasma membrane; endoplasmic reticulum; immunological synapse; basement membrane; apical plasma membrane; neuron projection; postsynaptic density membrane; glutamatergic synapse
Biological process	embryonic skeletal system morphogenesis; ureteric bud development; positive regulation of actin filament polymerization; positive regulation of potassium ion transport; negative regulation of p38MAPK cascade; amyloid precursor protein metabolic process; tissue morphogenesis; reproductive structure development; membrane raft organization; hard palate development; endothelial cell proliferation; smooth muscle tissue development; negative regulation of epithelial cell proliferation; regulation of sodium ion transmembrane transport; astral microtubule organization; actin filament organization; mitotic cell cycle checkpoint signaling; receptor clustering; establishment or maintenance of cell polarity; negative regulation of T cell proliferation; branching involved in ureteric bud morphogenesis; regulation of myelination; cortical microtubule organization; establishment or maintenance of epithelial cell apical/basal polarity; viral process; T cell cytokine production; T cell activation; peristalsis; receptor localization to synapse; negative regulation of protein kinase B signaling; regulation of NIK/NF-kappaB signaling; negative regulation of transcription by RNA polymerase II; nervous system development; regulation of cell shape; establishment of centrosome localization; immunological synapse formation; cortical actin cytoskeleton organization; protein localization; lens development in camera-type eye; bicellular tight junction assembly; positive regulation of cell population proliferation; negative regulation of ERK1 and ERK2 cascade; activation of protein kinase activity; negative regulation of mitotic cell cycle; regulation of membrane potential; protein localization to plasma membrane; GDP metabolic process; ion transmembrane transport; protein dephosphorylation; GMP metabolic process; chemical synaptic transmission; regulation of ventricular cardiac muscle cell action potential; regulation of potassium ion import; regulation of voltage-gated potassium channel activity involved in ventricular cardiac muscle cell action potential repolarization; regulation of potassium ion export across plasma membrane; MAPK cascade; cell-cell adhesion; maintenance of postsynaptic density structure; neurotransmitter receptor localization to postsynaptic specialization membrane; positive regulation of protein localization to plasma membrane; regulation of NMDA receptor activity
Sources:Amigo / QuickGO
Orthologs
Databases	NCBI: entry; OMA: entry
Species	Human	Mouse
Entrez	1739	13383
Ensembl	ENSG00000075711	ENSMUSG00000022770
UniProt	Q12959	Q811D0
RefSeq (mRNA)	NM_001098424; NM_001204386; NM_001204387; NM_001204388; NM_001290983 NM_004087; NM_001363865; NM_001366203; NM_001366204; NM_001366205; NM_001366206; NM_001366207; NM_001366208; NM_001366209; NM_001366210; NM_001366211; NM_001366212; NM_001366213; NM_001366214; NM_001366215; NM_001366216; NM_001366217; NM_001366218; NM_001366219; NM_001366220; NM_001366221; NM_001366222	NM_001252433; NM_001252434; NM_001252435; NM_001252436; NM_007862 NM_001357281; NM_001357282
RefSeq (protein)	NP_001091894; NP_001191315; NP_001191316; NP_001191317; NP_001277912 NP_004078; NP_001350794; NP_001353132; NP_001353133; NP_001353134; NP_001353135; NP_001353136; NP_001353137; NP_001353138; NP_001353139; NP_001353140; NP_001353141; NP_001353142; NP_001353143; NP_001353144; NP_001353145; NP_001353146; NP_001353147; NP_001353148; NP_001353149; NP_001353150; NP_001353151	NP_001239362; NP_001239363; NP_001239364; NP_001239365; NP_031888 NP_001344210; NP_001344211
Location (UCSC)	Chr 3: 197.04 – 197.3 Mb	Chr 16: 31.48 – 31.69 Mb
PubMed search
- Wikidata
View/Edit Human	View/Edit Mouse

Discs large homolog 1 (DLG1), also known as synapse-associated protein 97 or SAP97, is a scaffold protein that in humans is encoded by the SAP97 gene.

SAP97 is a mammalian MAGUK-family member protein that is similar to the Drosophila protein Dlg1 (the protein is alternatively referred to as hDlg1, and the human gene is DLG1). SAP97 is expressed throughout the body in epithelial cells. In the brain it is involved in the trafficking of ionotropic receptors from the endoplasmic reticulum to the plasma membrane, and may be involved in the trafficking AMPAR during synaptic plasticity.

== Function ==
SAP97 is expressed throughout the body in epithelial cells, including the kidney and brain. There is some evidence that SAP97 regulates cell-to-cell adhesion during cell death, and may interact with HPV. In the brain, SAP97's function is involved in the trafficking of transmembrane receptors from the ER to the plasma membrane.

SAP97's function has been investigated by reducing its expression by knockout or increasing its expression heterologously. Mice in which the SAP97 gene has been knocked out die perinatally, have a cleft palate, and deficiencies in renal function. Overexpression of SAP97 in mammalian neurons leads to increased synaptic strength.

== Clinical significance ==
Mutations in DLG1 are associated to Crohn's disease.

== Structure ==
SAP97's protein structure consists of an alternatively-spliced N-terminal domain, three PDZ domains, an SH3 domain, hook domain, I3 domain, and finally an inactive guanylate kinase (GK) domain. Each of these domains has specific interacting partners that help define SAP97's unique function.

The N-terminal of SAP97 can be alternatively spliced to contain a double-cysteine/palmitoylation site (α-isoform), or an L27 domain (β-isoform. The L27 domain is involved in SAP97 oligomerization with other SAP97 molecules, CASK, and other L27-domain-containing proteins. There is also a myosin VI binding site near N-terminal which may be involved in the internalization of AMPAR.

Each of SAP97's PDZ domains have different binding partners, including the AMPAR subunit GluR1 for the first PDZ domain, and neuroligin for the last. SAP97's I3 domain is unique to SAP97 among the MAGUK family, and is known to regulate the post-synaptic localization of SAP97 and to bind the protein 4.1N. The GK domain allows SAP97 to bind to GKAP/SAPAP-family proteins.
