= RALA =

Protein-coding gene in the species Homo sapiens

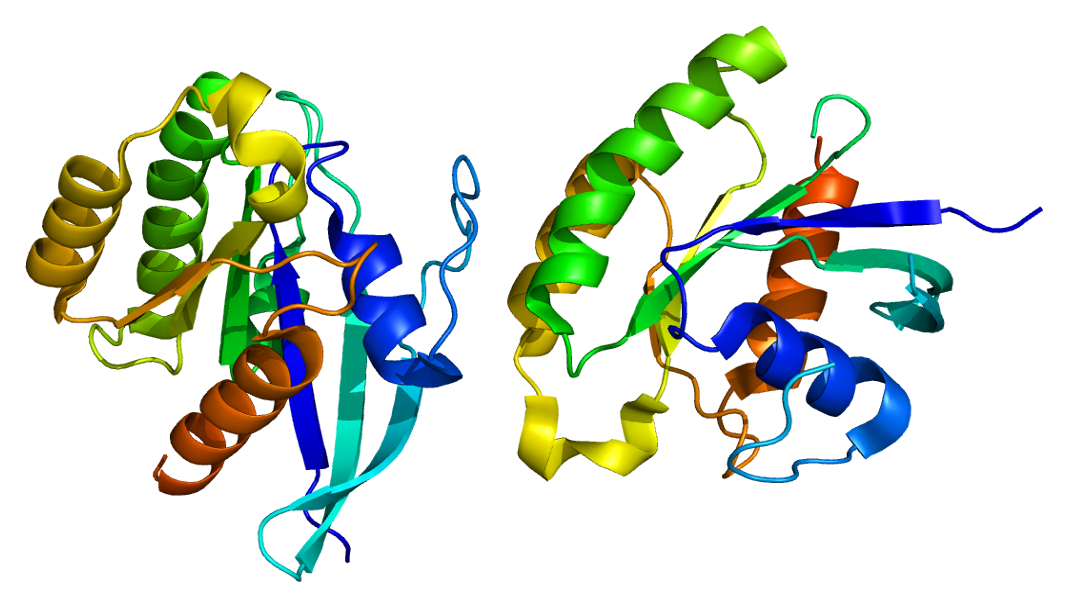

Identifiers
- Aliases: RALA, RAL, RALA Ras like proto-oncogene A, RAS like proto-oncogene A, HINCONS
- External IDs: OMIM: 179550; MGI: 1927243; GeneCards: RALA
Available structures
PDB	Ortholog search: PDBe RCSB
PDB	List of PDB id codes 1UAD, 1ZC3, 1ZC4, 2A78, 2A9K, 2BOV
Enzyme activity
EC #	BRENDA	ExPASy	KEGG	MetaCyc
3.6.5.2	↗	↗	↗	↗

Gene location (Human)
Chr.	Chromosome 7 (human)
Band	7p14.1	Start	39,623,565 bp
Band	7p14.1	End	39,708,120 bp

Gene location (Mouse)
Chr.	Chromosome 13 (mouse)
Band	13 A2|13 6.05 cM	Start	18,055,156 bp
Band	13 A2|13 6.05 cM	End	18,118,824 bp
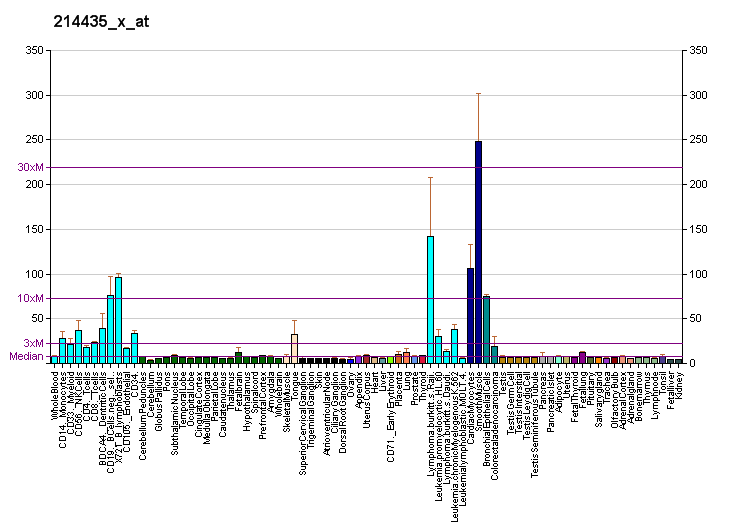
RNA expression pattern
Bgee	Human / Mouse (ortholog); Top expressed in: secondary oocyte; buccal mucosa cell; amniotic fluid; oral cavity; gingival epithelium; mucosa of pharynx; Brodmann area 23; skin of hip; visceral pleura; middle temporal gyrus / Top expressed in: otic placode; saccule; medial ganglionic eminence; otic vesicle; Rostral migratory stream; atrioventricular valve; maxillary prominence; human fetus; facial motor nucleus; endocardial cushion; More reference expression data
BioGPS	More reference expression data
Gene ontology
Molecular function	Edg-2 lysophosphatidic acid receptor binding; nucleotide binding; GDP binding; myosin binding; ATPase binding; GTP binding; protein binding; GTPase activity; ubiquitin protein ligase binding
Cellular component	membrane; focal adhesion; myelin sheath; plasma membrane; endocytic vesicle; cleavage furrow; extracellular exosome; cytoplasmic vesicle membrane; cell surface; Flemming body; intracellular anatomical structure
Biological process	actin cytoskeleton reorganization; cell division; regulation of exocytosis; chemotaxis; neural tube closure; membrane raft localization; cell cycle; membrane organization; viral process; positive regulation of filopodium assembly; signal transduction; exocytosis; Ras protein signal transduction; interleukin-12-mediated signaling pathway
Sources:Amigo / QuickGO
Orthologs
Databases	NCBI: entry; OMA: entry
Species	Human	Mouse
Entrez	5898	56044
Ensembl	ENSG00000006451	ENSMUSG00000008859
UniProt	P11233	P63321
RefSeq (mRNA)	NM_005402	NM_019491
RefSeq (protein)	NP_005393	NP_062364
Location (UCSC)	Chr 7: 39.62 – 39.71 Mb	Chr 13: 18.06 – 18.12 Mb
PubMed search
- Wikidata
View/Edit Human	View/Edit Mouse

Ras-related protein Ral-A (RalA) is a protein that in humans is encoded by the RALA gene on chromosome 7. This protein is one of two paralogs of the Ral protein, the other being RalB, and part of the Ras GTPase family. RalA functions as a molecular switch to activate a number of biological processes, majorly cell division and transport, via signaling pathways. Its biological role thus implicates it in many cancers.

== Structure ==
The Ral isoforms share an 80% overall match in amino acid sequence and 100% match in their effector-binding region. The two isoforms mainly differ in the C-terminal hypervariable region, which contains multiple sites for post-translational modification, leading to diverging subcellular localization and biological function. For example, phosphorylation of Serine 194 on RalA by Aurora kinase A results in the relocation of RalA to the inner mitochondrial membrane, where RalA helps carry out mitochondrial fission; whereas phosphorylation of Serine 198 on RalB by the kinase PKC results in the relocation of RalB to other internal membranes and activation of its tumorigenic function.

== Function ==
RalA is one of two proteins in the Ral family, which is itself a subfamily within the Ras family of small GTPases. As a Ras GTPase, RalA functions as a molecular switch that becomes active when bound to GTP and inactive when bound to GDP. RalA can be activated by RalGEFs and, in turn, activate effectors in signal transduction pathways leading to biological outcomes. For instance, RalA interacts with two components of the exocyst, Exo84 and Sec5, to promote autophagosome assembly, secretory vesicle trafficking, and tethering. Other downstream functions include exocytosis, receptor-mediated endocytosis, tight junction biogenesis, filopodia formation, mitochondrial fission, and cytokinesis. Ral-mediated exocytosis is also involved such biological processes as platelet activation, immune cell functions, neuronal plasticity, and regulation of insulin action.

While the above functions appear to be shared between the two Ral isoforms, their differential subcellular localizations result in their differing involvement in certain biological processes. In particular, RalA is more involved in anchorage-independent cell growth, vesicle trafficking, and cytoskeletal organization. Moreover, RalA specifically interacts with Exo84 and Sec5 to regulate transport of membrane proteins in polarized epithelial cells and GLUT4 to the plasma membrane, as well as mitochondrial fission for cell division.

== Clinical significance ==
Ral proteins have been associated with the progression of several cancers, including bladder cancer and prostate cancer. Though the exact mechanisms remain unclear, studies reveal that RalA promotes anchorage-independent growth in cancer cells. As a result, inhibition of RalA inhibits cancer initiation.

Due to its exocytotic role in platelets, immune cells, neurons, and insulin regulation, downregulation of Ral may lead to pathological conditions such as thrombosis and metabolic syndrome. In chronic thromboembolic pulmonary hypertension patients, Ral GTPases have been observed to be highly active in their platelets.

== Interactions ==
RalA has been shown to interact with:

- EXOC8,
- Filamin,
- PLD1,
- Sec5, and
- RALBP1.
