= RALB =

Protein-coding gene in the species Homo sapiens

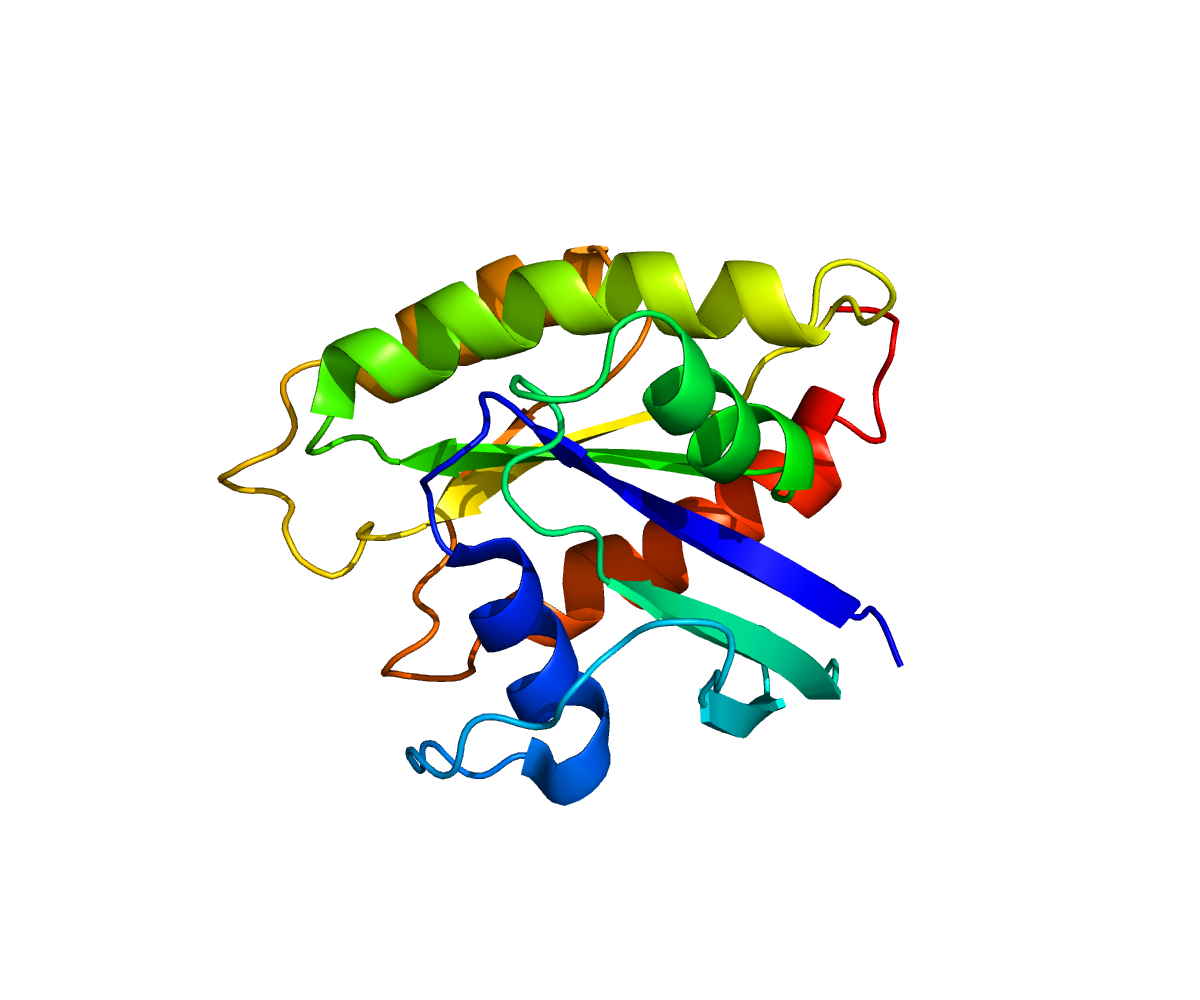

Identifiers
- Aliases: RALB, RAS like proto-oncogene B
- External IDs: OMIM: 179551; MGI: 1927244; GeneCards: RALB
Available structures
PDB	Ortholog search: PDBe RCSB
PDB	List of PDB id codes 2KE5, 2KWI
Enzyme activity
EC #	BRENDA	ExPASy	KEGG	MetaCyc
3.6.5.2	↗	↗	↗	↗

Gene location (Human)
Chr.	Chromosome 2 (human)
Band	2q14.2	Start	120,240,064 bp
Band	2q14.2	End	120,294,710 bp

Gene location (Mouse)
Chr.	Chromosome 1 (mouse)
Band	1|1 E2.3	Start	119,398,035 bp
Band	1|1 E2.3	End	119,432,524 bp
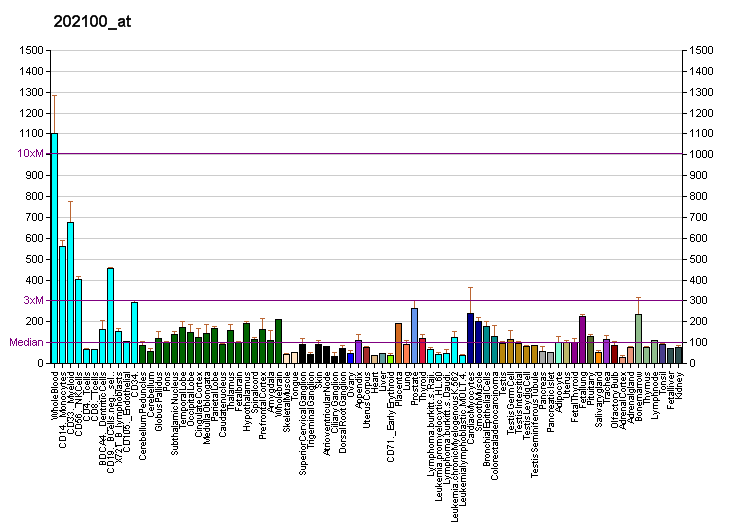

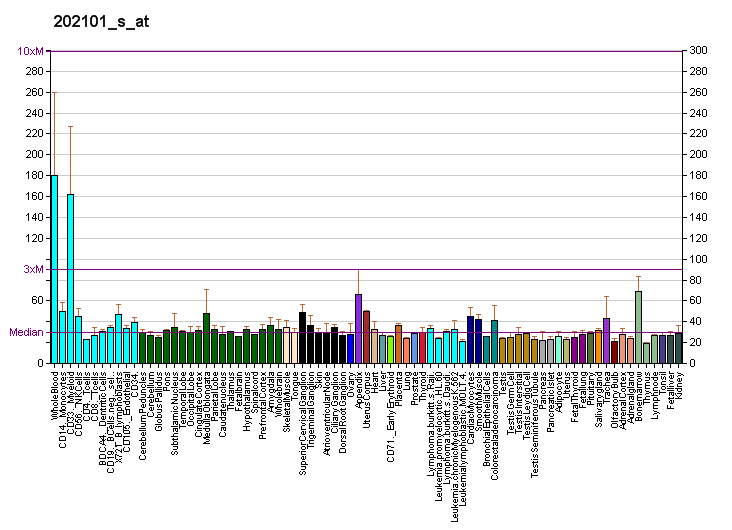
RNA expression pattern
Bgee	Human / Mouse (ortholog); Top expressed in: monocyte; blood; rectum; gallbladder; cingulate gyrus; oral cavity; anterior cingulate cortex; visceral pleura; smooth muscle tissue; granulocyte / Top expressed in: granulocyte; epithelium of stomach; endocardial cushion; left lung lobe; atrium; genital tubercle; yolk sac; cumulus cell; umbilical cord; placenta; More reference expression data
BioGPS	More reference expression data
Gene ontology
Molecular function	nucleotide binding; GDP binding; ATPase binding; GTP binding; protein binding; GTPase activity; ubiquitin protein ligase binding
Cellular component	membrane; plasma membrane; autophagosome; exocyst; extracellular exosome; intracellular anatomical structure; midbody
Biological process	positive regulation of protein phosphorylation; positive regulation of autophagosome assembly; cellular response to starvation; negative regulation of protein binding; positive regulation of protein serine/threonine kinase activity; cell division; regulation of exocyst assembly; cellular response to exogenous dsRNA; cell cycle; positive regulation of protein binding; signal transduction; regulation of exocyst localization; apoptotic process; Ras protein signal transduction
Sources:Amigo / QuickGO
Orthologs
Databases	NCBI: entry; OMA: entry
Species	Human	Mouse
Entrez	5899	64143
Ensembl	ENSG00000144118	ENSMUSG00000004451
UniProt	P11234	Q9JIW9
RefSeq (mRNA)	NM_002881; NM_001369400	NM_022327
RefSeq (protein)	NP_002872; NP_001356329	NP_071722
Location (UCSC)	Chr 2: 120.24 – 120.29 Mb	Chr 1: 119.4 – 119.43 Mb
PubMed search
- Wikidata
View/Edit Human	View/Edit Mouse

Ras-related protein Ral-B (RalB) is a protein that in humans is encoded by the RALB gene on chromosome 2. This protein is one of two paralogs of the Ral protein, the other being RalA, and part of the Ras GTPase family. RalA functions as a molecular switch to activate a number of biological processes, majorly cell division and transport, via signaling pathways. Its biological role thus implicates it in many cancers.

== Structure ==
The Ral isoforms share an 80% overall match in amino acid sequence and 100% match in their effector-binding region. The two isoforms mainly differ in the C-terminal hypervariable region, which contains multiple sites for post-translational modification, leading to diverging subcellular localization and biological function. For example, phosphorylation of Serine 194 on RalA by the kinase Aurora A results in the relocation of RalA to the inner mitochondrial membrane, where RalA helps carry out mitochondrial fission; whereas phosphorylation of Serine 198 on RalB by the kinase PKC results in the relocation of RalB to other internal membranes and activation of its tumorigenic function.

== Function ==
RalB is one of two proteins in the Ral family, which is itself a subfamily within the Ras family of small GTPases. As a Ras GTPase, RalB functions as a molecular switch that becomes active when bound to GTP and inactive when bound to GDP. RalB can be activated by RalGEFs and, in turn, activate effectors in signal transduction pathways leading to biological outcomes. For instance, RalB interacts with two components of the exocyst, Exo84 and Sec5, to promote autophagosome assembly, secretory vesicle trafficking, and tethering. Other downstream biological functions include exocytosis, receptor-mediated endocytosis, tight junction biogenesis, filopodia formation, mitochondrial fission, and cytokinesis.

While the above functions appear to be shared between the two Ral isoforms, their differential subcellular localizations result in their differing involvement in certain biological processes. In particular, RalB is more involved in apoptosis and cell motility. Moreover, RalB specifically interacts with Exo84 to assemble the beclin-1–VPS34 autophagy initiation complex, and with Sec5 to activate the innate immune response via the Tank-binding kinase 1 (TBK1).

== Clinical significance ==
Ral proteins have been associated with the progression of several cancers, including bladder cancer and prostate cancer. Though the exact mechanisms remain unclear, studies reveal that RalB promotes tumor invasion and metastasis. As a result, inhibition of RalB inhibits further progression of cancer. In addition, RalB regulates p53 levels in a K-Ras-independent manner during cancer development. RalB also promotes cell survival during infection by double-stranded DNA viruses by activating TBK1 to carry out an immune response.

== Interactions ==
RalB has been shown to interact with:

- CDC42,
- EXOC8,
- RALBP1, and
- Sec5.
