= RESF1 =

Protein-coding gene in the species Homo sapiens

Identifiers
- Aliases: RESF1, C12orf35, UTA2-1, GET, retroelement silencing factor 1, KIAA1551
- External IDs: MGI: 1914496; GeneCards: RESF1

Gene location (Human)
Chr.	Chromosome 12 (human)
Band	12p11.21	Start	31,959,370 bp
Band	12p11.21	End	31,993,107 bp

Gene location (Mouse)
Chr.	Chromosome 6 (mouse)
Band	6|6 G3	Start	149,210,912 bp
Band	6|6 G3	End	149,237,161 bp
RNA expression pattern
Bgee	Human / Mouse (ortholog); Top expressed in: right uterine tube; lymph node; jejunal mucosa; blood; granulocyte; spleen; buccal mucosa cell; left ovary; right ovary; monocyte / Top expressed in: zygote; cumulus cell; secondary oocyte; Rostral migratory stream; tail of embryo; primary oocyte; genital tubercle; blood; internal carotid artery; external carotid artery; More reference expression data
BioGPS	n/a
Gene ontology
Molecular function	histone binding
Cellular component	gamma-tubulin complex; nucleus
Biological process	negative regulation of single stranded viral RNA replication via double stranded DNA intermediate; positive regulation of DNA methylation-dependent heterochromatin assembly
Sources:Amigo / QuickGO
Orthologs
Databases	NCBI: entry; OMA: entry
Species	Human	Mouse
Entrez	55196	67246
Ensembl	ENSG00000174718	ENSMUSG00000032712
UniProt	Q9HCM1	Q5DTW7
RefSeq (mRNA)	NM_018169	NM_001289661; NM_001289662; NM_026054
RefSeq (protein)	NP_060639	NP_001276590; NP_001276591; NP_080330
Location (UCSC)	Chr 12: 31.96 – 31.99 Mb	Chr 6: 149.21 – 149.24 Mb
PubMed search
- Wikidata
View/Edit Human	View/Edit Mouse

Retroelement silencing factor 1 is a protein that in humans is encoded by the RESF1 gene. RESF1 is broadly expressed in the lymph nodes, ovaries, appendix and spleen. RESF1 shows characteristics of being a minor histocompatibility antigen, as well as tumor suppressor capabilities. The high expression in the lymph nodes and spleen indicate function in the immune system.

== Gene ==
RESF1 is a protein coding gene found on Chromosome 12 and maps to 12p11.21. Alternative names for this gene include Gonad Expressed Transcript (GET), UTA2-1 and C12orf35. RESF1 has 7 exons, 3 of which occur before the start codon.

=== Tissue expression ===
==== Normal ====
A study of normal human tissue expression profiling shows that RESF1 is highly expressed in the thymus, spleen, bone marrow and liver. This is interesting as it relates to common organs associated with the Immune system.

Gene tissue expression patterns found through the National Center for Biotechnology Information UniGene EST Profile showed that there was also high expression of RESF1 in the lymph nodes, uterus, mouth, thyroid, larynx and blood.

==== Cancer ====
An evaluation of RESF1 expression in health states was performed using NCBI Unigene's EST Profile. Although RESF1 is highly expressed in uterine tumors, it is also highly expressed in the uterus, suggesting the gene is unlikely to be closely associated with uterine cancer. However, RESF1 may be related to adrenal tumors, as its expression is lower in normal kidney tissue.

=== Transcript ===
==== Transcription factor binding sites ====
Transcription factor binding sites within the promoter of RESF1 mainly included transcription factors associated with bone marrow cells, antibody-producing cells, and blood cells. This supports the association of RESF1 with the functioning immune system.

== Protein ==
RESF1 is 1747 amino acids in length and has one domain of unknown function, DUF4617. The Molecular Weight of RESF1 is 194.9 kdal. The basal isoelectric point is 8.95. A localization prediction suggests that RESF1 is likely a nuclear protein.

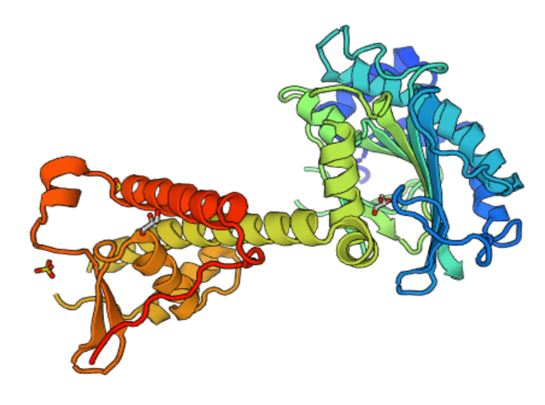
Predicted 3D structure of RESF1

=== Protein structure ===
The secondary structure of RESF1 consists of mainly random coil structures (approximately 59.2%), few alpha helices (24% of residues) and fewer extended strands (15.8% of residues).

A predicted 3-D structure was created using Swiss model work space, shown above.

=== Protein interactions ===
RESF1 interacts with NANOG, MDM2, EXOC1 and CALML3. These interactions further suggest RESF1 is a nuclear protein, and that it may be associated with tumor-suppressor proteins and immune system proteins.

EXOC1 was involved in a schizophrenia study, relating a schizophrenia risk gene (DISC1) to a network of protein-protein interactions. This study used a two-hybrid assay as evidence to the protein interaction between RESF1 and EXOC1. EXOC1 functions as a response to microbial infections, which reduces viral RNA synthesis and protein translation.

NANOG was predicted to interact with RESF1 based on an affinity capture-MS, which linked NANOG to proteins involved with the cell cycle. This study used affinity purification combined with high accuracy mass spectrometry to find specific protein interactions. NANOG was also found to be an essential transcription factor in embryonic stem cells, specifically involved in gene expression to affect cell fate.

MDM2 is a gene that interacts with others to affect the cell cycle and apoptosis, and is located in tissues common to RESF1, such as the uterus and lymph node. MDM2 was found to interact with RESF1 through the use of a phage display library. This interaction further suggests that RESF1 is a nuclear protein, as MDM2 and its splice variants contain nuclear localization signals for nucleoplasmic distribution.

CALML3 was found to interact with RESF1 based on affinity capture-MS assay, similar to how NANOG was found to interact with RESF1. A study on CALML3 expression in epidermal development showed that CALML3 was useful marker for development, and loss of CALML3 expression correlated with malignant phenotypes.

== Evolutionary relationships ==
=== Orthologs ===
The closest orthologs to RESF1 are primates, however, conserved sequences can be found in whales, bears, snakes, birds, turtles, and frogs. Orthologs of RESF1 diverged as long ago as 353 million years ago (Xenopus laevis), while the closest evolutionary ortholog is Papio anubis, which diverged approximately 28.1 million years ago.

Scientific name	Name	Accession	Sequence Similarity %	Date of Divergence (MYA)
Papio anubis	Olive Baboon	XP_003906231.2	28.1	28.1
Propithecus coquereli	Crowned Sifaka	XP_012496506	81	73
Physeter Catadon	Sperm whale	XP_007116796.1	74	94
Delphinapterus leucas	Beluga whale	XP_022433618.1	74	94
Calypte anna	Anna's Hummingbird	XP_008493940	55	312
Chrysemys picta belli	Western Painted Turtle	XP_008175485.1	43	312
Python bivittatus	Burmese Python	XP_007443900.1	43	312
Xenopus laevis	African Clawed Frog	XP_018107375	43	353

=== Phylogenetic tree ===
An unrooted phylogenetic tree of RESF1 was created of 20 orthologs and the human RESF1 gene.

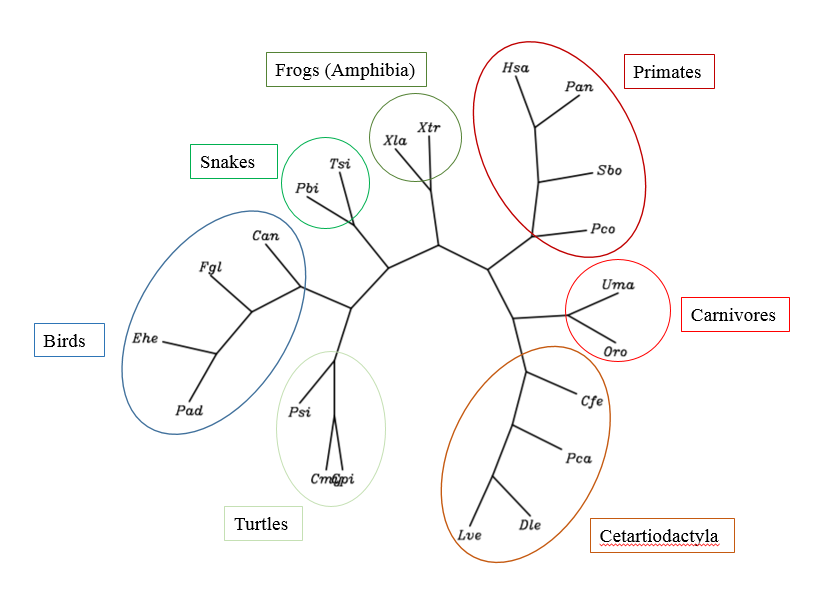
This phylogenetic tree shows inferred evolutionary relationships of the human RESF1 gene and 20 of its orthologs.

=== Molecular phylogeny ===
A graph shown below of the molecular evolution of RESF1 shows that it evolved relatively quickly compared to both cytochrome C, a slowly evolving protein, and fibrinogen alpha, which evolved more quickly than cytochrome C. The comparison shows that RESF1 is fairly quickly diverging, which suggests that it could be a gene that changes quickly in response to its environment, such as the introduction of a pathogen.

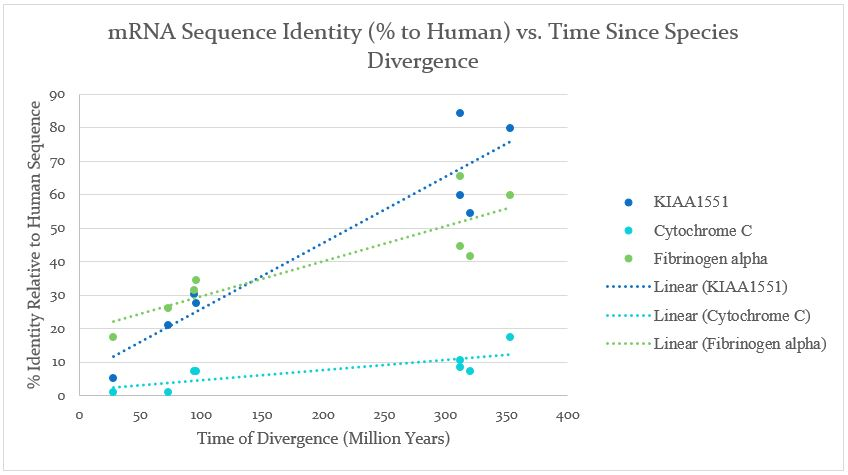
This graph shows the molecular evolution of the RESF1 gene in comparison to the evolution of cytochrome C and fibrinogen alpha.
