= Exocyst =

The exocyst is an octameric protein complex involved in vesicle trafficking, specifically the tethering and spatial targeting of post-Golgi vesicles to the plasma membrane prior to vesicle fusion. It is implicated in a number of cell processes, including exocytosis, cell migration, and growth.

== Subunits ==
The exocyst is composed of eight subunits, whose nomenclature differs between mammalian cells and Saccharomyces cerevisiae.

| Subunit | Mammalian cells | Saccharomyces cerevisiae |
|---|---|---|
| 1 | EXOC1 | Sec3 |
| 2 | EXOC2 | Sec5 |
| 3 | EXOC3 | Sec6 |
| 4 | EXOC4 | Sec8 |
| 5 | EXOC5 | Sec10 |
| 6 | EXOC6 | Sec15 |
| 7 | EXOC7 | Exo70 |
| 8 | EXOC8 | Exo84 |

== Function ==
The exocyst complex serves to direct vesicles after the Golgi complex to specific locations on the plasma membrane and to mediate their tethering and localization to the membrane immediately before fusion. The exocyst complex has also been implicated in the active trafficking of mitochondria from immune cells to cancer cells. Because of this function, the exocyst complex is heavily involved in exocytosis. Sec3 (EXOC1) and Exo70 (EXOC7) are localized to the plasma membrane, and are physically attached to the membrane by Rho GTPases such as CDC42. Other complementary exocyst components such as Sec15 (EXOC6) and Sec4 are localized to the vesicle membrane. Exocyst proteins on the plasma membrane bind vesicular exocyst proteins, bringing the vesicle very close to the plasma membrane in a fashion similar to the SNARE interactions to facilitate fusion.

The exocyst also interacts with Rho GTPases responsible for controlling cell polarity and the activity of the cytoskeleton.

== History ==
Hints of a multi-subunit complex involved in yeast exocytosis came from work in Peter Novick's group, then at Yale University School of Medicine, in the early 1990s. Works led by Robert Bowser and Daniel TerBush in 1992 and 1995 respectively isolated Sec6p and Sec8p, showing them to participate in a complex of at least eight proteins, found at the site of active exocytosis. In 1996, the same group identified the exocyst member proteins in yeast and coined the name "exocyst" for the complex.
