= DLG4 =

Mammalian protein found in Homo sapiens

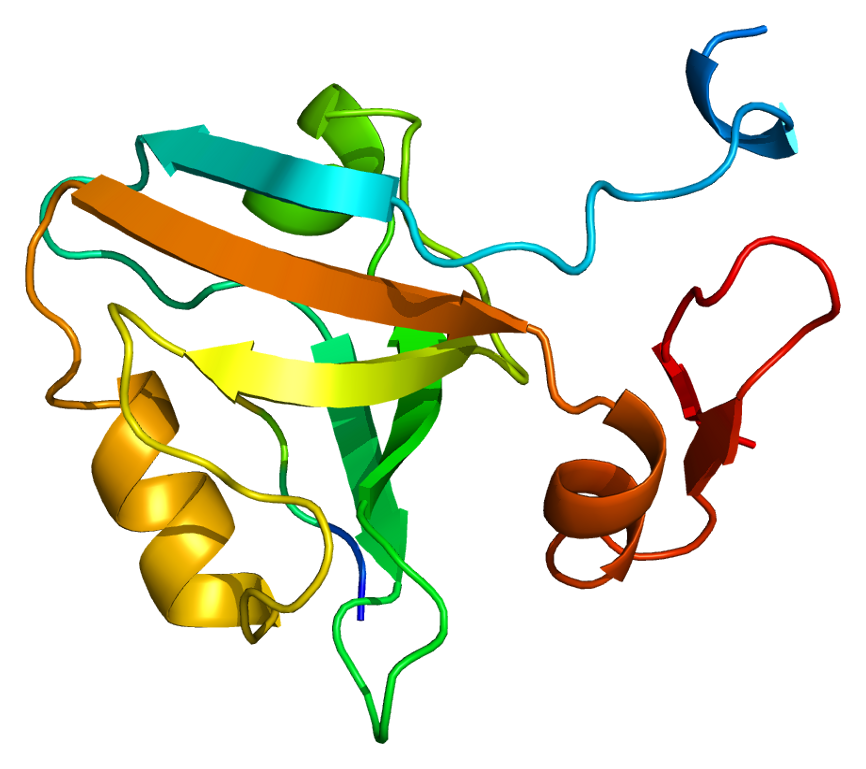

Identifiers
- Aliases: DLG4, PSD95, SAP-90, SAP90, Dlgh4, PSD-95, SAP90A, discs large homolog 4, discs large MAGUK scaffold protein 4, MRD62
- External IDs: OMIM: 602887; MGI: 1277959; GeneCards: DLG4
Available structures
PDB	Ortholog search: PDBe RCSB
PDB	List of PDB id codes 1KEF, 3I4W, 3K82, 3ZRT

Gene location (Human)
Chr.	Chromosome 17 (human)
Band	17p13.1	Start	7,187,187 bp
Band	17p13.1	End	7,219,841 bp

Gene location (Mouse)
Chr.	Chromosome 11 (mouse)
Band	11|11 B3	Start	69,907,768 bp
Band	11|11 B3	End	69,938,348 bp
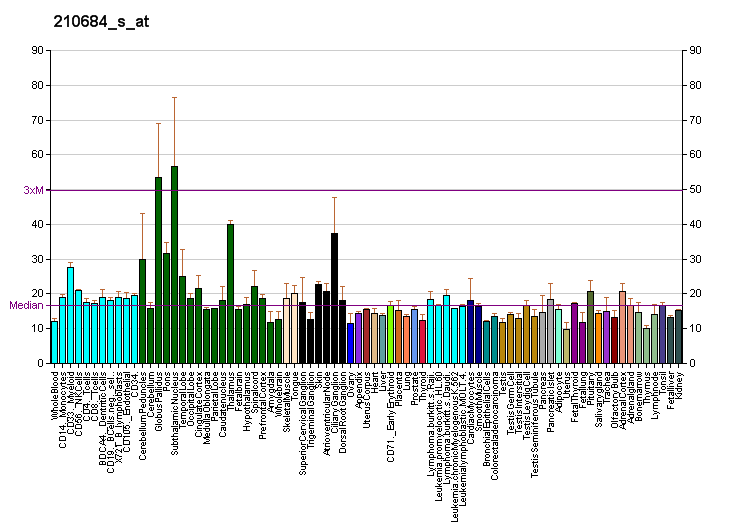

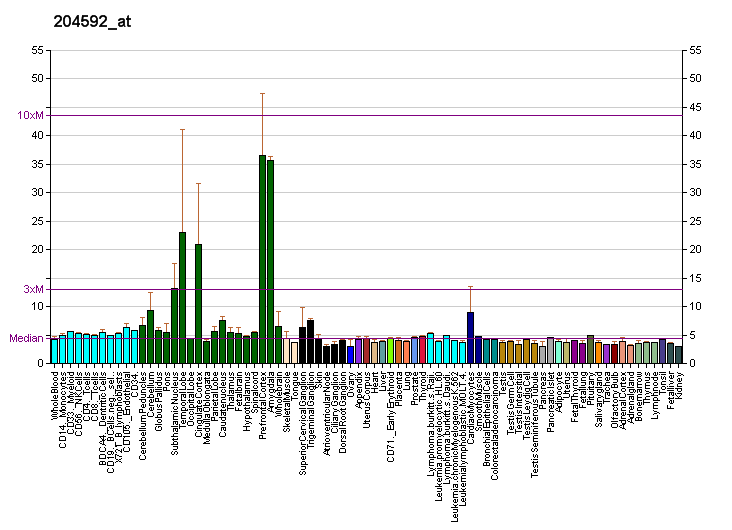
RNA expression pattern
Bgee	Human / Mouse (ortholog); Top expressed in: right hemisphere of cerebellum; right frontal lobe; nucleus accumbens; cingulate gyrus; anterior cingulate cortex; prefrontal cortex; anterior pituitary; Brodmann area 9; amygdala; caudate nucleus / Top expressed in: neural layer of retina; dentate gyrus of hippocampal formation granule cell; superior frontal gyrus; primary visual cortex; CA3 field; tail of embryo; perirhinal cortex; cerebellar cortex; entorhinal cortex; genital tubercle; More reference expression data
BioGPS	More reference expression data
Gene ontology
Molecular function	beta-1 adrenergic receptor binding; PDZ domain binding; protein-containing complex binding; scaffold protein binding; guanylate kinase activity; P2Y1 nucleotide receptor binding; acetylcholine receptor binding; kinase binding; protein C-terminus binding; protein binding; ionotropic glutamate receptor binding; D1 dopamine receptor binding; protein phosphatase binding; neuroligin family protein binding; ligand-gated ion channel activity
Cellular component	cytoplasm; juxtaparanode region of axon; endocytic vesicle membrane; synaptic membrane; postsynaptic membrane; cell projection; membrane; postsynaptic density; synaptic vesicle; extrinsic component of cytoplasmic side of plasma membrane; voltage-gated potassium channel complex; cortical cytoskeleton; plasma membrane; dendritic spine; synapse; excitatory synapse; cerebellar mossy fiber; axon; cell junction; dendrite; basolateral plasma membrane; endoplasmic reticulum; neuron spine; AMPA glutamate receptor complex; dendrite cytoplasm; ionotropic glutamate receptor complex; neuron projection terminus; cell periphery; cytosol; postsynaptic density membrane; postsynapse; neuromuscular junction; neuron projection; glutamatergic synapse
Biological process	receptor localization to synapse; regulation of grooming behavior; regulation of long-term neuronal synaptic plasticity; neuromuscular process controlling balance; negative regulation of receptor internalization; establishment of protein localization; positive regulation of cytosolic calcium ion concentration; learning; nervous system development; MAPK cascade; locomotory exploration behavior; regulation of NMDA receptor activity; AMPA glutamate receptor clustering; dendritic spine morphogenesis; vocalization behavior; positive regulation of synaptic transmission; establishment or maintenance of epithelial cell apical/basal polarity; positive regulation of excitatory postsynaptic potential; social behavior; synaptic vesicle maturation; protein localization to synapse; signal transduction; GMP metabolic process; GDP metabolic process; chemical synaptic transmission; transmembrane transport; cellular response to potassium ion; receptor clustering; positive regulation of protein tyrosine kinase activity; protein-containing complex assembly; cell-cell adhesion; postsynaptic neurotransmitter receptor diffusion trapping; positive regulation of neuron projection arborization; neurotransmitter receptor localization to postsynaptic specialization membrane
Sources:Amigo / QuickGO
Orthologs
Databases	NCBI: entry; OMA: entry
Species	Human	Mouse
Entrez	1742	13385
Ensembl	ENSG00000132535	ENSMUSG00000020886
UniProt	P78352; O14909	Q62108
RefSeq (mRNA)	NM_001128827; NM_001365; NM_001321074; NM_001321075; NM_001321076 NM_001321077; NM_001369566	NM_001109752; NM_007864; NM_001370671; NM_001370672; NM_001370674 NM_001370675
RefSeq (protein)	NP_001122299; NP_001308003; NP_001308004; NP_001308005; NP_001308006 NP_001356	NP_001103222; NP_031890
Location (UCSC)	Chr 17: 7.19 – 7.22 Mb	Chr 11: 69.91 – 69.94 Mb
PubMed search
- Wikidata
View/Edit Human	View/Edit Mouse

PSD-95 (postsynaptic density protein 95) also known as SAP-90 (synapse-associated protein 90) is a protein that in humans is encoded by the DLG4 (discs large homolog 4) gene.

PSD-95 is a member of the membrane-associated guanylate kinase (MAGUK) family. With PSD-93 it is recruited into the same NMDA receptor and potassium channel clusters. These two MAGUK proteins may interact at postsynaptic sites to form a multimeric scaffold for the clustering of receptors, ion channels, and associated signaling proteins. PSD-95 is the best studied member of the MAGUK-family of PDZ domain-containing proteins. Like all MAGUK-family proteins, its basic structure includes three PDZ domains, an SH3 domain, and a guanylate kinase-like domain (GK) connected by disordered linker regions. It is almost exclusively located in the post synaptic density of neurons, and is involved in anchoring synaptic proteins. Its direct and indirect binding partners include neuroligin, NMDA receptors, AMPA receptors, and potassium channels. It plays an important role in synaptic plasticity and the stabilization of synaptic changes during long-term potentiation.

== MAGUK superfamily and constituent domains ==
PSD-95 (encoded by DLG4) is a member of the MAGUK superfamily, and part of a subfamily which also includes PSD-93, SAP97 and SAP102. The MAGUKs are defined by their inclusion of PDZ, SH3 and GUK domains, although many of them also contain regions homologous of CaMKII, WW and L27 domains. The GUK domain that they have is structurally very similar to that of the guanylate kinases, however it is known to be catalytically inactive as the P-Loop which binds ATP is absent. It is thought that the MAGUKs have subfunctionalized the GUK domain for their own purposes, primarily based on its ability to form protein-protein interactions with cytoskeleton proteins, microtubule/actin based machinery and molecules involved in signal transduction.

The PDZ domain which are contained in the MAGUKs in varying numbers, is replicated three times over in PSD-95. PDZ domains are short peptide binding sequences commonly found at the C-terminus of interacting proteins. The three copies within the gene have different binding partners, due to amino acid substitutions within the PSD-95 protein and its ligands. The SH3 domain is again a protein-protein interaction domain. Its family generally bind to PXXP sites, but in MAGUKs it is known to bind to other sites as well. One of the most well known features is that it can form an intramolecular bond with the GUK domain, creating what is known as a GUK-SH3 'closed' state. The regulatory mechanisms and function are unknown but it is hypothesized that it may involve a hook region and a calmodulin binding region located elsewhere in the gene.

== Interactions ==
PSD-95 has been shown to interact with:

- ADAM22
- Beta-1 adrenergic receptor
- CACNG2
- CASK
- DLG3
- DLGAP1
- DLGAP2
- DYNLL1
- DYNLL2
- ERBB4
- EXOC4
- FYN
- FZD7
- GRIK1
- GRIK2
- GRIK5
- GRIN2A
- GRIN2B
- GRIN2C
- HER2/neu
- HGS
- KCNA2
- KCNA4
- KCNA5
- KCNJ12
- Kir2.1
- LGI1
- LRP1
- LRP2
- NLGN1
- NOS1
- PTK2B
- SEMA4C and
- SHANK2.

== See also ==
- Postsynaptic density
