= CRIPT =

Protein-coding gene in humans

Identifiers
- Aliases: CRIPT, SSMDF, HSPC139, CXXC repeat containing interactor of PDZ3 domain
- External IDs: OMIM: 604594; MGI: 1929655; GeneCards: CRIPT

Gene location (Human)
Chr.	Chromosome 2 (human)
Band	2p21	Start	46,616,416 bp
Band	2p21	End	46,630,176 bp

Gene location (Mouse)
Chr.	Chromosome 17 (mouse)
Band	17|17 E4	Start	87,332,978 bp
Band	17|17 E4	End	87,343,238 bp
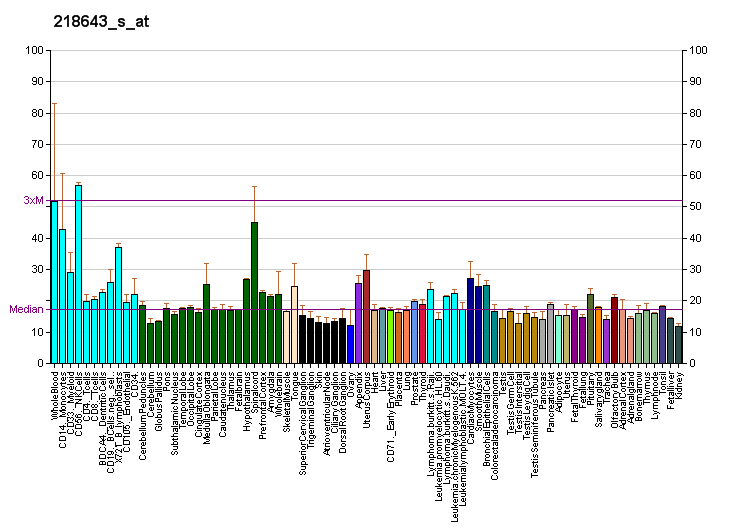
RNA expression pattern
Bgee	Human / Mouse (ortholog); Top expressed in: endothelial cell; corpus epididymis; caput epididymis; tail of epididymis; cerebellar vermis; internal globus pallidus; superficial temporal artery; visceral pleura; buccal mucosa cell; trabecular bone / Top expressed in: zygote; spermatocyte; spermatid; medial ganglionic eminence; endocardial cushion; Epithelium of choroid plexus; seminal vesicula; blood; facial motor nucleus; anterior horn of spinal cord; More reference expression data
BioGPS	More reference expression data
Gene ontology
Molecular function	microtubule binding; scaffold protein binding; PDZ domain binding; protein binding; protein-containing complex binding
Cellular component	cytoplasm; dendritic shaft; cell junction; soma; dendritic spine; dendrite; cell projection; synapse; nucleolus; postsynaptic density; nucleus; fibrillar center
Biological process	regulation of postsynaptic density protein 95 clustering; protein localization to microtubule; cytoplasmic microtubule organization; establishment of protein localization
Sources:Amigo / QuickGO
Orthologs
Databases	NCBI: entry; OMA: entry
Species	Human	Mouse
Entrez	9419	56724
Ensembl	ENSG00000119878	ENSMUSG00000024146
UniProt	Q9P021	O70333
RefSeq (mRNA)	NM_014171	NM_019936
RefSeq (protein)	NP_054890	NP_064320
Location (UCSC)	Chr 2: 46.62 – 46.63 Mb	Chr 17: 87.33 – 87.34 Mb
PubMed search
- Wikidata
View/Edit Human	View/Edit Mouse

Cysteine-rich PDZ-binding protein is a protein that in humans is encoded by the CRIPT gene.

== Interactions ==
CRIPT has been shown to interact with DLG3.
