= RALBP1 =

Protein-coding gene in the species Homo sapiens

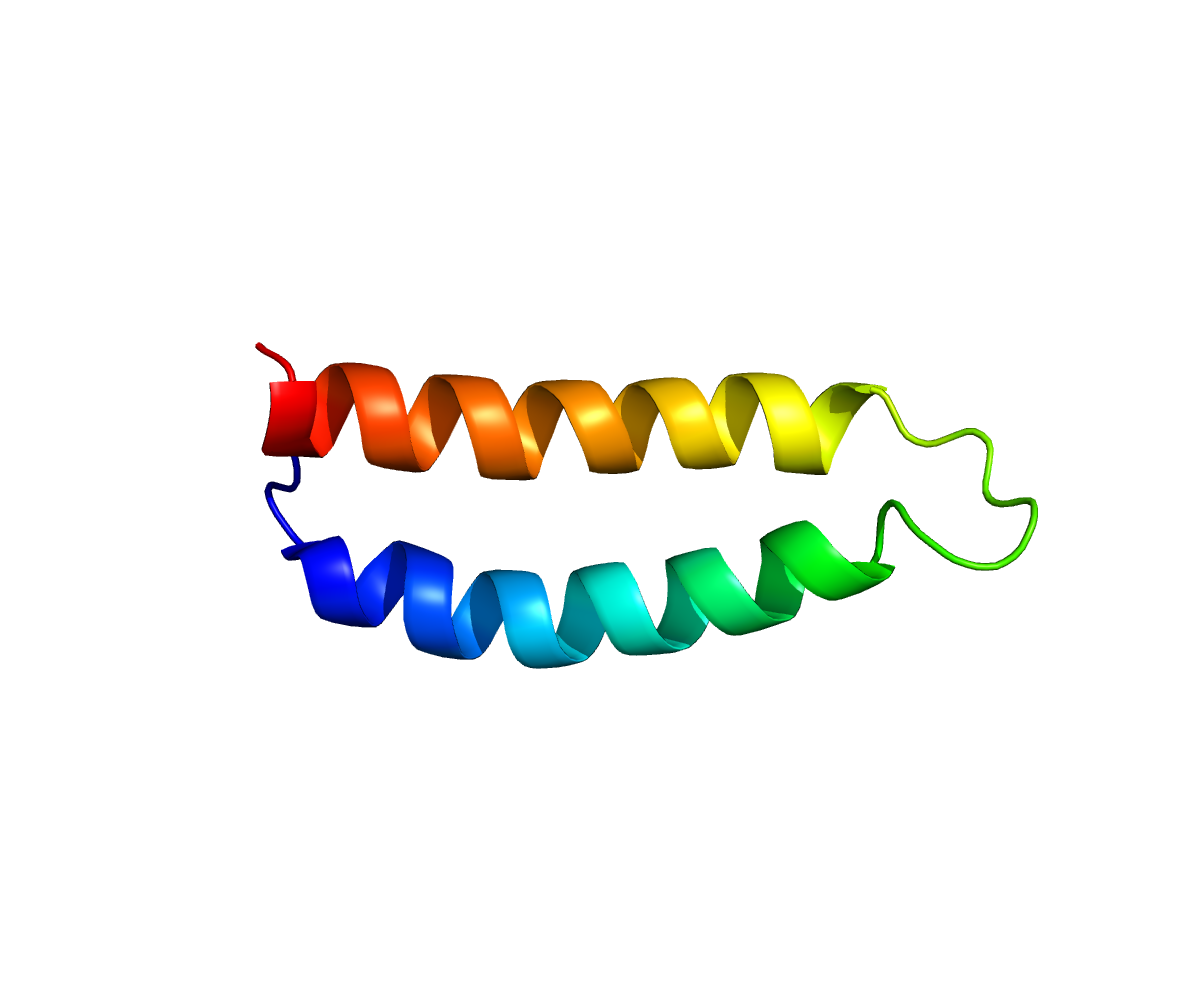
Available structures
PDB	Ortholog search: PDBe RCSB
PDB	List of PDB id codes 2KWH, 2KWI, 2MBG

Identifiers
- Aliases: RALBP1, RIP1, RLIP1, RLIP76, ralA binding protein 1
- External IDs: OMIM: 605801; MGI: 108466; HomoloGene: 4940; GeneCards: RALBP1; OMA:RALBP1 - orthologs

Gene location (Human)
Chr.	Chromosome 18 (human)
Band	18p11.22	Start	9,475,009 bp
Band	18p11.22	End	9,538,114 bp

Gene location (Mouse)
Chr.	Chromosome 17 (mouse)
Band	17 E1.1|17 35.26 cM	Start	66,155,413 bp
Band	17 E1.1|17 35.26 cM	End	66,192,793 bp
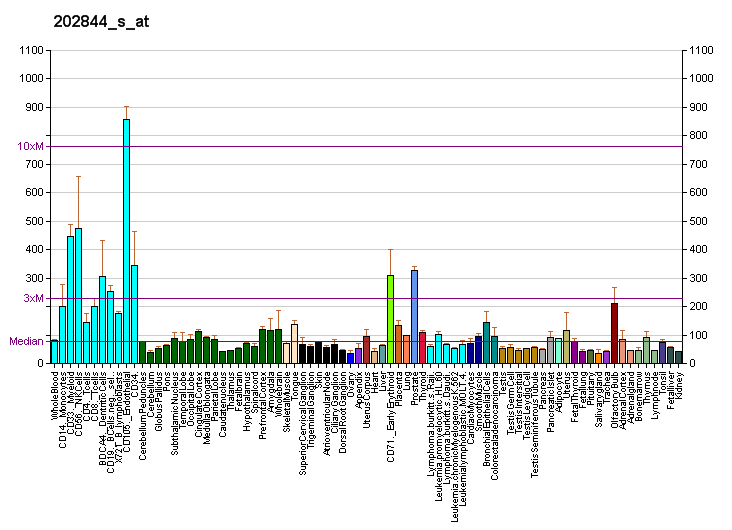

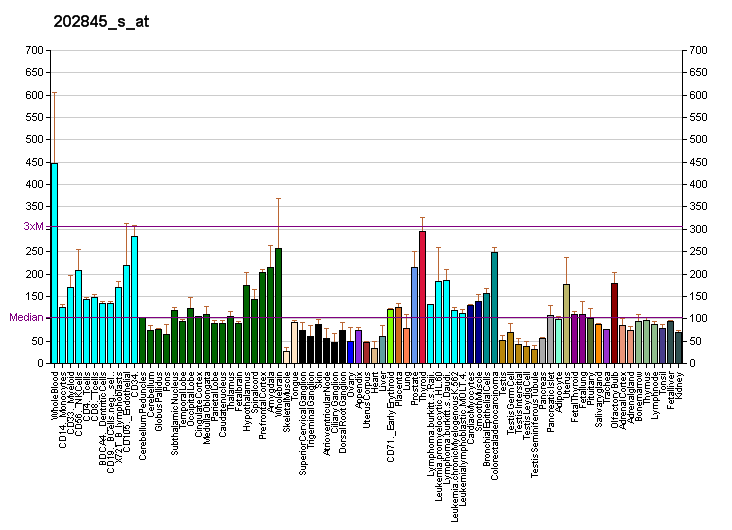
RNA expression pattern
Bgee	Human / Mouse (ortholog); Top expressed in: renal medulla; nipple; spinal ganglia; buccal mucosa cell; pylorus; trigeminal ganglion; human penis; external globus pallidus; mucosa of pharynx; pars reticulata / Top expressed in: zygote; primary oocyte; Rostral migratory stream; secondary oocyte; lactiferous gland; genital tubercle; lacrimal gland; tail of embryo; esophagus; seminal vesicula; More reference expression data
BioGPS	More reference expression data
Gene ontology
Molecular function	protein binding; transmembrane transporter activity; GTPase activator activity; xenobiotic transmembrane transporter activity; ATPase-coupled transmembrane transporter activity
Cellular component	cytosol; membrane
Biological process	endocytosis; regulation of small GTPase mediated signal transduction; transmembrane transport; regulation of GTPase activity; chemotaxis; positive regulation of GTPase activity; signal transduction; small GTPase mediated signal transduction; xenobiotic transmembrane transport; doxorubicin transport; xenobiotic detoxification by transmembrane export across the plasma membrane
Sources:Amigo / QuickGO
Orthologs
Species	Human	Mouse
Entrez	10928	19765
Ensembl	ENSG00000017797	ENSMUSG00000024096
UniProt	Q15311	Q62172
RefSeq (mRNA)	NM_006788	NM_001198949; NM_009067
RefSeq (protein)	NP_006779	NP_001185878; NP_033093
Location (UCSC)	Chr 18: 9.48 – 9.54 Mb	Chr 17: 66.16 – 66.19 Mb
PubMed search
- Wikidata
View/Edit Human	View/Edit Mouse

RalA-binding protein 1 is a protein that in humans is encoded by the RALBP1 gene.

== Interactions ==
RALBP1 has been shown to interact with:

- Cyclin B1,
- HSF1,
- RALA,
- RALB, and
- REPS2.
