= Minor histocompatibility antigen =

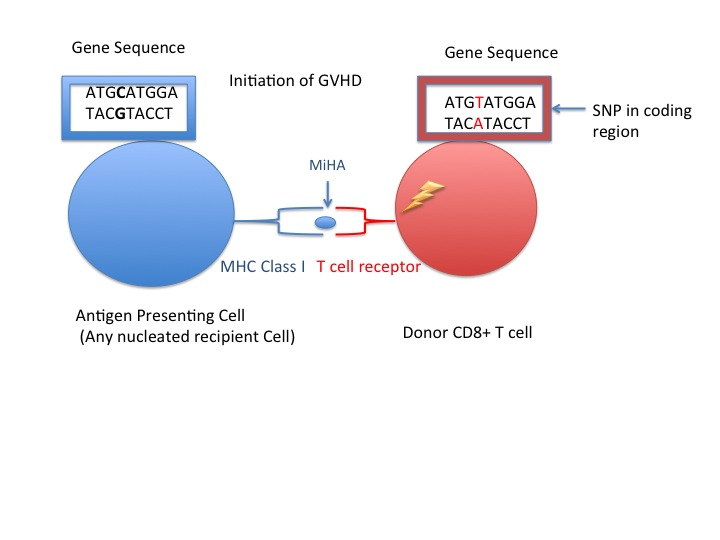
A single nucleotide change (SNP) in the coding region of the recipient is polymorphic or different from the amino acid sequence of a donor's T cell. The T cell receptor specific for peptide and MHC molecule; therefore, recognizes the self-peptide bound to the groove of HLA matched gene as foreign and initiates an immune response. The donor's CD8+ T cell targets the recipient's nucleated cell resulting in graft-versus-host disease.

Minor histocompatibility antigen (also known as MiHA) are peptides presented on the cellular surface of donated organs that are known to give an immunological response in some organ transplants. They cause problems of rejection less frequently than those of the major histocompatibility complex (MHC). Minor histocompatibility antigens (MiHAs) are diverse, short segments of proteins and are referred to as peptides. These peptides are normally around 9-12 amino acids in length and are bound to both the major histocompatibility complex (MHC) class I and class II proteins. Peptide sequences can differ among individuals and these differences arise from SNPs in the coding region of genes, gene deletions, frameshift mutations, or insertions. About a third of the characterized MiHAs come from the Y chromosome. Prior to becoming a short peptide sequence, the proteins expressed by these polymorphic or diverse genes need to be digested in the proteasome into shorter peptides. These endogenous or self peptides are then transported into the endoplasmic reticulum with a peptide transporter pump called TAP where they encounter and bind to the MHC class I molecule. This contrasts with MHC class II molecules's antigens which are peptides derived from phagocytosis/endocytosis and molecular degradation of non-self entities' proteins, usually by antigen-presenting cells. MiHA antigens are either ubiquitously expressed in most tissue like skin and intestines or restrictively expressed in the immune cells.

Minor histocompatibility antigens are due to normal proteins that are in themselves polymorphic in a given population. Even when a transplant donor and recipient are identical with respect to their major histocompatibility complex genes, the amino acid differences in minor proteins can cause the grafted tissue to be slowly rejected. Several of the identified Autosomally and Y chromosome encoded MiHAs

== Known minor histocompatibility antigens ==
The following table lists the known MiHAs, the variant of genes encode MiHA peptides and their restricted HLA alleles.

MiHA ID	MiHA peptide	Restricted HLA	Chromosome	Coordinate	SNP ID	Gene	Ensembl Gene ID
HA-1/A2	VL[H/R]DDLLEA	A*02:01	chr19	1068739	rs1801284	HMHA1	ENSG00000180448
HA-2	YIGEVLVS[V/M]	A*02:01	chr7	44977022	rs61739531	MYO1G	ENSG00000136286
HA-8	[R/P]TLDKVLEV	A*02:01	chr9	2828765	rs2173904	KIAA0020	ENSG00000080608
HA-3	V[T/M]EPGTAQY	A*01:01	chr15	85579423	rs2061821	AKAP13	ENSG00000170776
C19ORF48	CIPPD[S/T]LLFPA	A*02:01	chr19	50798945	rs3745526	C19ORF48	ENSG00000167747
LB-ADIR-1F	SVAPALAL[F/S]PA	A*02:01	chr1	179082165	rs2296377	TOR3A	ENSG00000186283
LB-HIVEP1-1S	SLPKH[S/N]VTI	A*02:01	chr6	12123016	rs2228220	HIVEP1	ENSG00000095951
LB-NISCH-1A	ALAPAP[A/V]EV	A*02:01	chr3	52489389	rs887515	NISCH	ENSG00000010322
LB-SSR1-1S	[S/L]LAVAQDLT	A*02:01	chr6	7310026	rs10004	SSR1	ENSG00000124783
LB-WNK1-1I	RTLSPE[I/M]ITV	A*02:01	chr12	889199	rs12828016	WNK1	ENSG00000060237
T4A	GLYTYWSAG[A/E]	A*02:01	chr3	140688418	rs9876490	TRIM42	ENSG00000155890
UTA2-1	QL[L/P]NSVLTL	A*02:01	chr12	31981704	rs2166807	KIAA1551	ENSG00000174718
PANE1	RVWDLPGVLK	A*03:01	chr22	41940168	rs5758511	CENPM	ENSG00000100162
SP110	SLP[R/G]GTSTPK	A*03:01	chr2	230207994	rs1365776	SP110	ENSG00000135899
ACC-1C	DYLQ[Y/C]VLQI	A*24:02	chr15	79971064	rs1138357	BCL2A1	ENSG00000140379
ACC-1Y	DYLQ[Y/C]VLQI	A*24:02	chr15	79971064	rs1138357	BCL2A1	ENSG00000140379
P2RX7	WFHHC[H/R]PKY	A*29:02	chr12	121167552	rs7958311	P2RX7	ENSG00000089041
ACC-4	ATLPLLCA[R/G]	A*31:01	chr15	78944951	rs2289702	CTSH	ENSG00000103811
ACC-5	WATLPLLCA[R/G]	A*33:03	chr15	78944951	rs2289702	CTSH	ENSG00000103811
LB-APOBEC3B-1K	[K/E]PQYHAEMCF	B*07:02	chr22	38985821	rs2076109	APOBEC3B	ENSG00000179750
LB-ARHGDIB-1R	LPRACW[R/P]EA	B*07:02	chr12	14942624	rs4703	ARHGDIB	ENSG00000111348
LB-BCAT2-1R	QP[R/T]RALLFVIL	B*07:02	chr19	48799813	rs11548193	BCAT2	ENSG00000105552
LB-EBI3-1I	RPRARYY[I/V]QV	B*07:02	chr19	4236999	rs4740	EBI3	ENSG00000105246
LB-ECGF-1H	RP[H/R]AIRRPLAL	B*07:02	chr22	50525826	rs112723255	TYMP	ENSG00000025708
LB-ERAP1-1R	HPRQEQIALLA	B*07:02	chr5	96803547	rs26653	ERAP1	ENSG00000164307
LB-FUCA2-1V	RLRQ[V/M]GSWL	B*07:02	chr6	143502020	rs3762002	FUCA2	ENSG00000001036
LB-GEMIN4-1V	FPALRFVE[V/E]	B*07:02	chr17	746265	rs4968104	GEMIN4	ENSG00000179409
LB-PDCD11-1F	GPDSSKT[F/L]LCL	B*07:02	chr10	103434329	rs2986014	PDCD11	ENSG00000148843
LB-TEP1-1S	APDGAKVA[S/P]L	B*07:02	chr14	20383870	rs1760904	TEP1	ENSG00000129566
LRH-1	TPNQRQNVC	B*07:02	chr17	3690983	rs3215407	P2X5	ENSG00000083454
ZAPHIR	IPRDSWWVEL	B*07:02	chr19	57492212	rs2074071	ZNF419	ENSG00000105136
HEATR1	ISKERA[E/G]AL	B*08:01	chr1	236554626	rs2275687	HEATR1	ENSG00000119285
HA-1/B60	KECVL[H/R]DDL	B*40:01	chr19	1068739	rs1801284	HMHA1	ENSG00000180448
LB-SON-1R	SETKQ[R/C]TVL	B*40:01	chr21	33553954	rs13047599	SON	ENSG00000159140
LB-SWAP70-1Q	MEQLE[Q/E]LEL	B*40:01	chr11	9748015	rs415895	SWAP70	ENSG00000133789
LB-TRIP10-1EPC	G[E/G][P/S]QDL[C/G]TL	B*40:01	chr19	6751268	rs1049229	TRIP10	ENSG00000125733
SLC1A5	AE[A/P]TANGGLAL	B*40:02	chr19	46787917	rs3027956	SLC1A5	ENSG00000105281
ACC-2	KEFED[D/G]IINW	B*44:03	chr15	79970875	rs3826007	BCL2A1	ENSG00000140379
ACC-6	MEIFIEVFSHF	B*44:03	chr18	63953532	rs9945924	HMSD	ENSG00000221887
HB-1H	EEKRGSL[H/Y]VW	B*44:03	chr5	143820488	rs161557	HMHB1	ENSG00000158497
HB-1Y	EEKRGSL[H/Y]VW	B*44:03	chr5	143820488	rs161557	HMHB1	ENSG00000158497
DPH1	S[V/L]LPEVDVW	B*57:01	chr17	2040586	rs35394823	DPH1	ENSG00000108963
UTDP4-1	R[I/N]LAHFFCGW	DPB1*04	chr9	128721272	rs11539209	ZDHHC12	ENSG00000160446
CD19	WEGEPPC[L/V]P	DQB1*02:01	chr16	28933075	rs2904880	CD19	ENSG00000177455
LB-PI4K2B-1S	SRSS[S/P]AELDRSR	DQB1*06:03	chr4	25234395	rs313549	PI4K2B	ENSG00000038210
LB-MTHFD1-1Q	SSIIAD[Q/R]IALKL	DRB1*03:01	chr14	64442127	rs2236225	MTHFD1	ENSG00000100714
LB-LY75-1K	LGITYR[N/K]KSLMWF	DRB1*13:01	chr2	159819916	rs12692566	LY75	ENSG00000054219
SLC19A1	[R/H]LVCYLCFY	DRB1*15:01	chr21	45537880	rs1051266	SLC19A1	ENSG00000173638
LB-PTK2B-1T	VYMND[T/K]SPLTPEK	DRB3*01:01	chr8	27451068	rs751019	PTK2B	ENSG00000120899
LB-MR1-1R	YFRLGVSDPI[R/H]G	DRB3*02:02	chr1	181049100	rs2236410	MR1	ENSG00000153029

== T cell Response to MiHAs ==
The MiHAs bound to a MHC presented on a cell surface may be recognized as a self peptide or not recognized by either CD8+ or CD4+ T cells. The lack of recognition of a T cell to this self antigen is the reason why allogeneic stem cell transplantation for an HLA matched gene or a developing fetus's MiHAs during pregnancy may not be recognized by T cells and marked as foreign leading to an immune response. Although B cell receptors can also recognize MHCs, immune responses seem to only be elicited by T cells. The consequences of an immune response are seen in allogeneic hematopoietic stem cell transplantation (HCT) when the peptides encoded by polymorphic genes differ between the recipient and the donor T cells. As a result, the donor T cells can target the recipients cells called graft-versus-host disease (GVHD). Although graft or bone marrow rejection can have detrimental effects, there are immunotherapy benefits when cytotoxic T lymphocytes are specific for a self antigen and can target antigens expressed selectively on leukemic cells in order to destroy these tumor cells referred to as graft-versus- leukemia effect (GVL).

The recognition of a mature T cell to this self antigen should not induce an immune response. During thymic selection occurring in the thymus, only a thymocyte TCR that recognizes either class I or class II MHC molecule plus peptide should survive positive selection. However, there is death by apoptosis of thymocytes that do not interact with MHC molecules or have high-affinity receptors for self MHC plus self antigen a process referred to as negative selection. Therefore, the process of positive and negative selection means fewer self-reactive mature T cells will leave the thymus and lead to autoimmune problems.

== Discovery of MiHAs ==
The significance of MiHAs in an immune response was recognized following transplantation. The recipient developed GVHD despite having a HLA- matched genes at the Major Histocompatibility locus. The experiment raised questions about the possibility of there being MiHAs. More specifically, the first MiHA was discovered when bone marrow transplantation occurred between opposite sexes. The female recipient obtained MHC-matched bone marrow cells but still had active cytotoxic T cells (CD8+). The CD8+ T cells were active and targeted the male bone marrow cells. The male bone marrow cells were found to be presenting a peptide in the MHC groove encoded by a gene on Y chromosome. The peptide was foreign to the female T cells and females lack the Y chromosome and, thus, this MiHA. The MiHAs encoded by the Y chromosome are known as HY antigens.

== H-Y Antigen ==
H-Y antigens are encoded by genes on the Y chromosome. Both HLA class I and II alleles have been found to present these antigens. Some of these antigens are ubiquitously expressed in nucleated male cells, and the presence of these antigens has been associated with a greater risk of developing GVHD allogeneic stem cell transplantation for a HLA matched gene when there's a male recipient and female donor. H-Y MiHA play a role in pregnancy with a male fetus because fetal cells can cross from the placenta into the maternal blood stream where the maternal T cells respond to the foreign antigen presented on both MHC class I and II. Therefore, H-Y specific CD8+ T cells develop in the maternal blood and can target the fetal cells with nucleus expressing the antigen on a MHC class I molecule. The response to these fetal H-Y antigens are involved with women experiencing secondary recurrent miscarriage who were previously pregnant with a male fetus. Women with an earlier male pregnancy have T cells which were previously exposed to these H-Y antigens, and consequently recognize them quicker. It has been found that women with recurrent miscarriage also contain MHC II with ability to present these antigens to T helper cells (CD4+) which is significant for CD8+ activation.

== Histocompatibility Antigen 1 (HA1) ==
HA1 results from a SNP converting the nonimmunogenic allele (KECVLRDDLLEA) to an immunogenic allele (KECVLHDDLLEA). This SNP results in better peptide binding ability to the groove of a particular MHC class I molecules found on antigen presenting cells. The significance of the peptide changing to an immunogenic form is that now specific HLA-A 0201 restricted T cells can recognize the peptide presented by MHC class I HLA-A0201 molecules. This recognition leads to an immune response if the T cells recognize the peptide as foreign. This recognition occurs when an individual lacks the immunogenic version of the peptide, but is exposed to the HA-1 peptide during pregnancy or allogeneic stem cell transplantation. During pregnancy, the fetal HA-1 has been found to originate in the placenta and specific maternal CD8+ T cells recognizing this MiHA have been identified.

== Immunotherapy Graft-Versus- Leukemia Effect ==
CD8+ T cells that are specific for a MiHA can target these antigens when they are expressed specifically on tumor cells, which allows for the destruction of harmful tumor cells. In mice, allogeneic stem cell transplantation donor CD8+ T cells specific for a MiHA found in the recipient has been shown to inhibit the division of leukemic cells. However, there is a risk in developing GVHD if the T cells are specific for MiHAs expressed ubiquitously on epithelial cells. More specifically, HA-8, UGT2B17 and SMCY MiHAs that are ubiquitously expressed present a higher risk of developing GVHD. Therefore, in order to prevent adverse GVHD effects, immune cell restricted MiHAs are ideal targets for graft-versus- leukemia (GVL) since not all nucleated cells are targeted by responding T cells. An example of an ideal target is the MiHA HB-1, which is highly expressed in harmful B cells, but has a low expression in other tissue cells.

== Clinical implications ==
Immunisation of mothers against male-specific minor histocompatibility (H-Y) antigens has a pathogenic role in many cases of secondary recurrent miscarriage, that is, recurrent miscarriage in pregnancies succeeding a previous live birth. An example of this effect is that the male:female ratio of children born prior and subsequent to secondary recurrent miscarriage is 1.49 and 0.76 respectively.

== See also ==
- JARID1D
