= DLG3 =

Protein-coding gene in humans

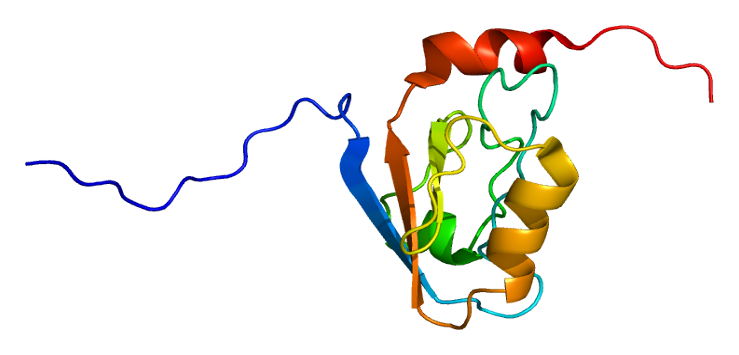

Identifiers
- Aliases: DLG3, MRX, MRX90, NEDLG, PPP1R82, SAP102, XLMR, discs large homolog 3, discs large MAGUK scaffold protein 3, XLID90
- External IDs: OMIM: 300189; MGI: 1888986; GeneCards: DLG3
Available structures
PDB	Ortholog search: PDBe RCSB
PDB	List of PDB id codes 1UM7, 2FE5, 2I1N

Gene location (Human)
Chr.	X chromosome (human)
Band	Xq13.1	Start	70,444,835 bp
Band	Xq13.1	End	70,505,490 bp

Gene location (Mouse)
Chr.	X chromosome (mouse)
Band	X|X C3	Start	99,811,328 bp
Band	X|X C3	End	99,862,016 bp
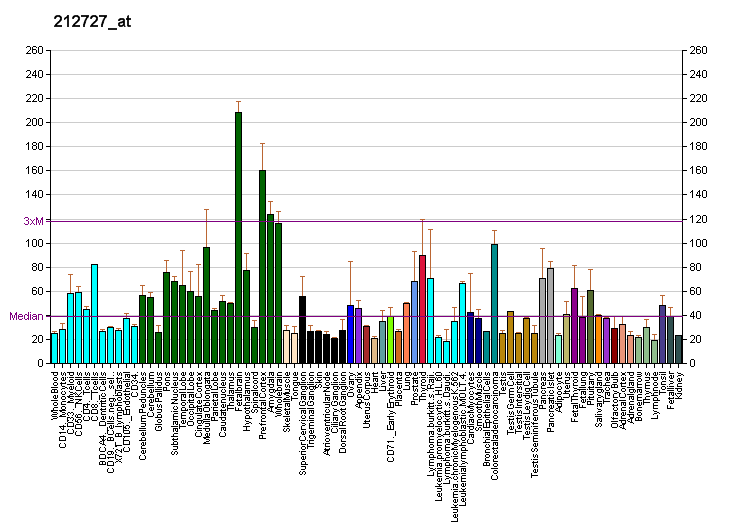

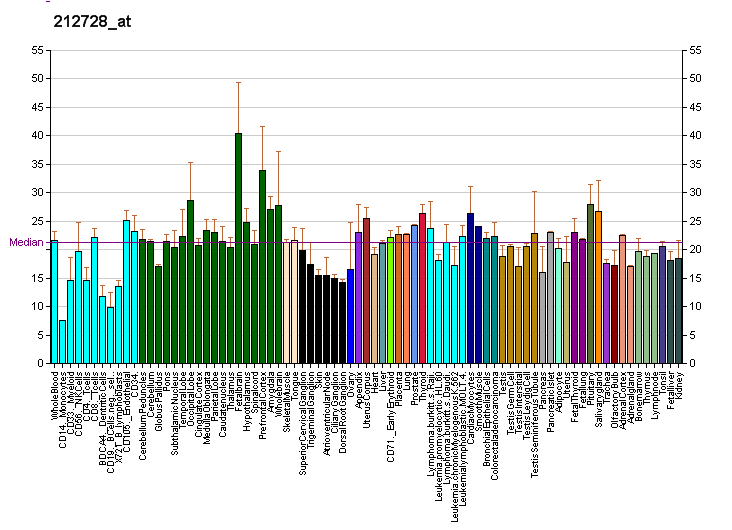

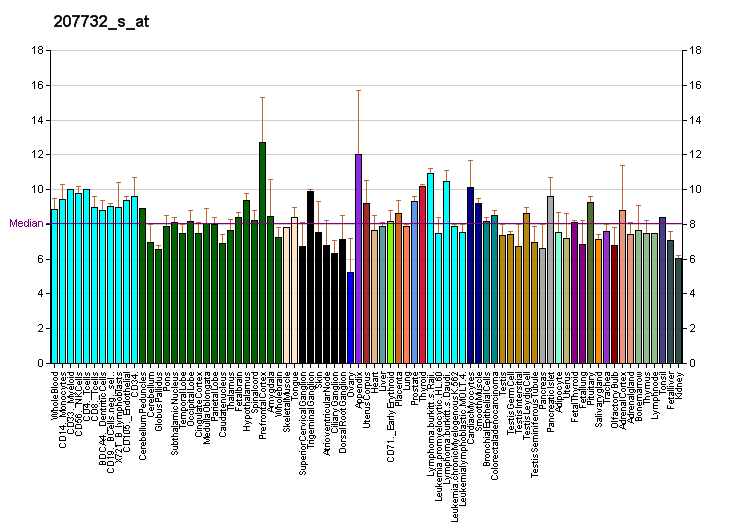
RNA expression pattern
Bgee	Human / Mouse (ortholog); Top expressed in: body of pancreas; buccal mucosa cell; ganglionic eminence; rectum; olfactory zone of nasal mucosa; islet of Langerhans; middle temporal gyrus; pancreatic ductal cell; mucosa of transverse colon; prefrontal cortex / Top expressed in: dentate gyrus of hippocampal formation granule cell; retinal pigment epithelium; superior frontal gyrus; hippocampus proper; cingulate gyrus; piriform cortex; olfactory tubercle; primary visual cortex; Region I of hippocampus proper; amygdala; More reference expression data
BioGPS	More reference expression data
Gene ontology
Molecular function	phosphatase binding; PDZ domain binding; protein domain specific binding; guanylate kinase activity; kinase binding; protein C-terminus binding; protein binding; ionotropic glutamate receptor binding; protein phosphatase binding; ubiquitin protein ligase binding; ligand-gated ion channel activity; structural constituent of postsynaptic density
Cellular component	cytoplasm; postsynaptic membrane; postsynaptic density; cell-cell junction; bicellular tight junction; growth cone; plasma membrane; synapse; dendritic shaft; soma; basolateral plasma membrane; AMPA glutamate receptor complex; ionotropic glutamate receptor complex; extracellular space; cytosol; cell junction; neuromuscular junction; neuron projection; postsynaptic density membrane; glutamatergic synapse; postsynaptic density, intracellular component
Biological process	receptor localization to synapse; negative regulation of phosphatase activity; establishment of planar polarity; receptor clustering; nervous system development; establishment or maintenance of epithelial cell apical/basal polarity; negative regulation of cell population proliferation; ion transmembrane transport; GMP metabolic process; GDP metabolic process; chemical synaptic transmission; MAPK cascade; positive regulation of protein tyrosine kinase activity; cell-cell adhesion; regulation of postsynaptic membrane neurotransmitter receptor levels; maintenance of postsynaptic density structure; regulation of NMDA receptor activity
Sources:Amigo / QuickGO
Orthologs
Databases	NCBI: entry; OMA: entry
Species	Human	Mouse
Entrez	1741	53310
Ensembl	ENSG00000082458	ENSMUSG00000000881
UniProt	Q92796	P70175
RefSeq (mRNA)	NM_001166278; NM_020730; NM_021120	NM_001177778; NM_001177779; NM_001177780; NM_001290402; NM_016747
RefSeq (protein)	NP_001159750; NP_065781; NP_066943	NP_001171249; NP_001171250; NP_001171251; NP_001277331; NP_058027
Location (UCSC)	Chr X: 70.44 – 70.51 Mb	Chr X: 99.81 – 99.86 Mb
PubMed search
- Wikidata
View/Edit Human	View/Edit Mouse

Disks large homolog 3 (DLG3) also known as neuroendocrine-DLG or synapse-associated protein 102 (SAP-102) is a protein that in humans is encoded by the DLG3 gene. DLG3 is a member of the membrane-associated guanylate kinase (MAGUK) superfamily of proteins.

== Interactions ==
DLG3 has been shown to interact with:

- APC,
- CRIPT,
- DLG4,
- EXOC3,
- EXOC4,
- GRIN2A,
- GRIN2B,
- GRIN2C,
- KCNJ12
- PTK2B, and
- SYNGAP1.
