= EXOC7 =

Protein-coding gene in the species Homo sapiens

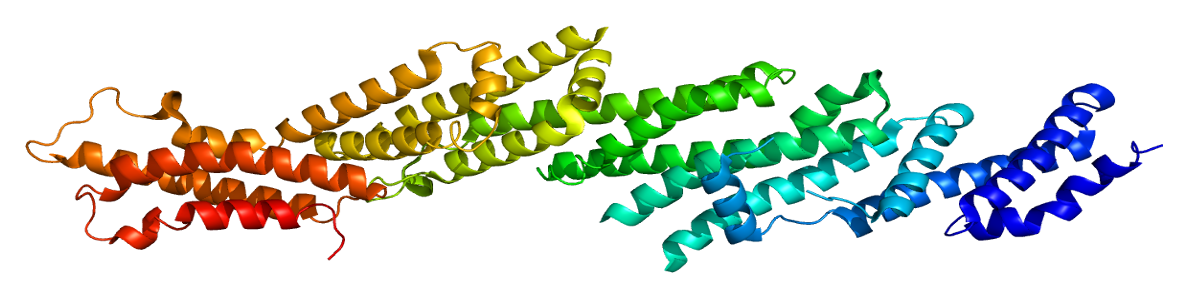

Identifiers
- Aliases: EXOC7, 2-5-3p, EX070, EXO70, EXOC1, Exo70p, YJL085W, exocyst complex component 7, BLOM4, NEDSEBA
- External IDs: OMIM: 608163; MGI: 1859270; GeneCards: EXOC7
Available structures
PDB	Ortholog search: PDBe RCSB
PDB	List of PDB id codes 2PFT

Gene location (Human)
Chr.	Chromosome 17 (human)
Band	17q25.1	Start	76,081,016 bp
Band	17q25.1	End	76,121,576 bp

Gene location (Mouse)
Chr.	Chromosome 11 (mouse)
Band	11|11 E2	Start	116,178,827 bp
Band	11|11 E2	End	116,198,059 bp
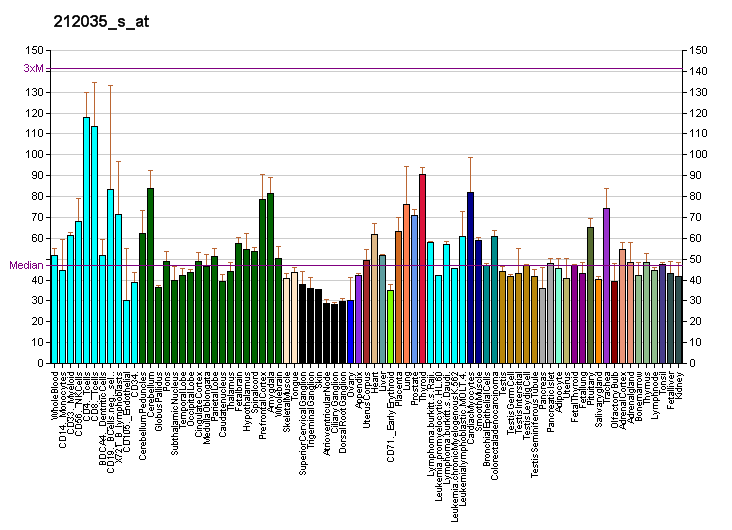

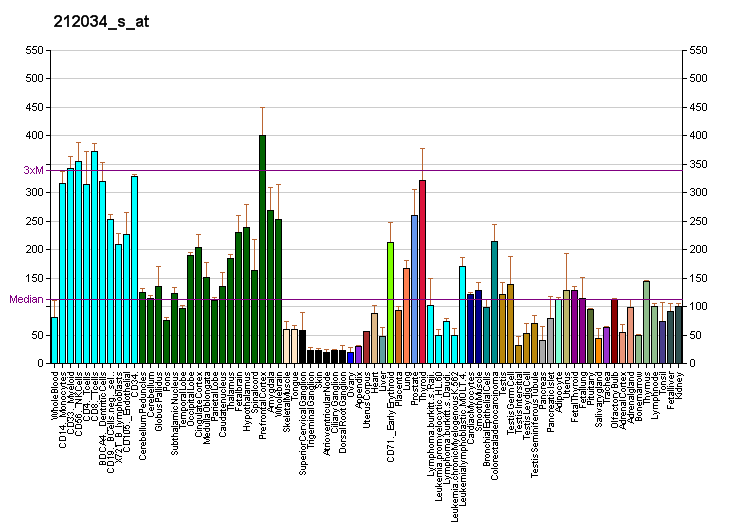

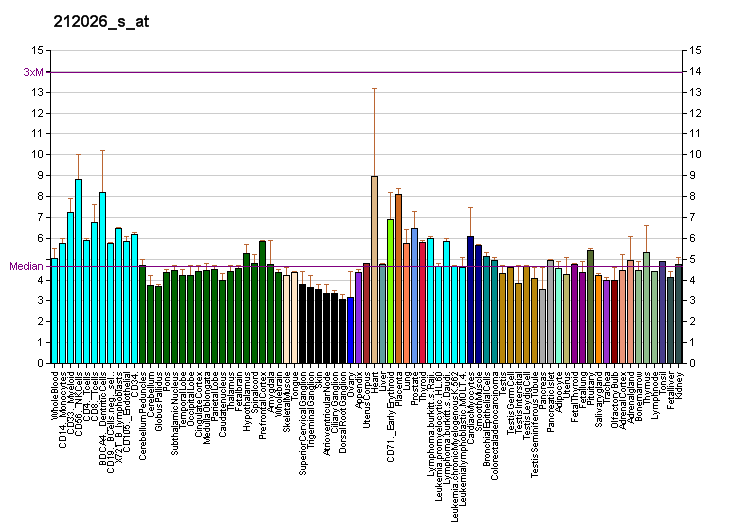
RNA expression pattern
Bgee	Human / Mouse (ortholog); Top expressed in: right uterine tube; ganglionic eminence; parotid gland; ventricular zone; right lobe of thyroid gland; stromal cell of endometrium; external globus pallidus; pituitary gland; right hemisphere of cerebellum; left lobe of thyroid gland / Top expressed in: triceps brachii muscle; spermatocyte; spermatid; superior frontal gyrus; ventricular zone; muscle of thigh; primary visual cortex; temporal muscle; neural layer of retina; neural tube; More reference expression data
BioGPS	More reference expression data
Gene ontology
Molecular function	protein binding
Cellular component	cytoplasm; cytosol; plasma membrane; growth cone membrane; exocyst; centriolar satellite; membrane; microtubule organizing center; Flemming body
Biological process	protein transport; regulation of entry of bacterium into host cell; regulation of macroautophagy; exocytosis; transport
Sources:Amigo / QuickGO
Orthologs
Databases	NCBI: entry; OMA: entry
Species	Human	Mouse
Entrez	23265	53413
Ensembl	ENSG00000182473	ENSMUSG00000020792
UniProt	Q9UPT5	O35250
RefSeq (mRNA)	NM_001013839; NM_001145297; NM_001145298; NM_001145299; NM_001282313 NM_001282314; NM_015219; NM_001375974; NM_001375975; NM_001375976	NM_001162872; NM_016857; NM_001347636; NM_001362838; NM_001362839 NM_001378960; NM_001378961
RefSeq (protein)	NP_001013861; NP_001138769; NP_001138770; NP_001138771; NP_001269242 NP_001269243; NP_056034; NP_001362903; NP_001362904; NP_001362905	NP_001156344; NP_001334565; NP_058553; NP_001349767; NP_001349768 NP_001365889; NP_001365890
Location (UCSC)	Chr 17: 76.08 – 76.12 Mb	Chr 11: 116.18 – 116.2 Mb
PubMed search
- Wikidata
View/Edit Human	View/Edit Mouse

Exo70 exocyst complex subunit
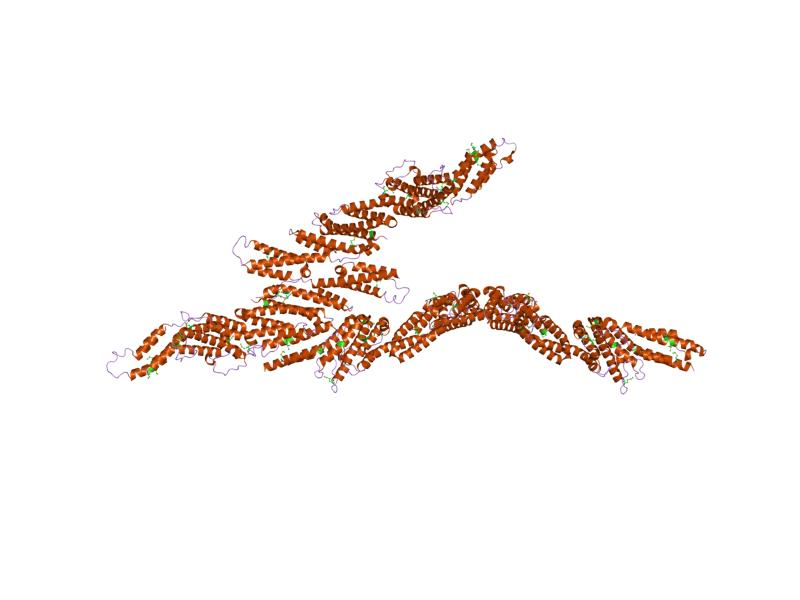
- crystal structure of the s. cerevisiae exocyst component exo70p

Identifiers
- Symbol: Exo70
- Pfam: PF03081
- Pfam clan: CL0295
- InterPro: IPR004140
Available protein structures:
- PDB: IPR004140 PF03081 (ECOD; PDBsum)
- AlphaFold: IPR004140; PF03081

Exocyst complex component 7 is a protein that in humans is encoded by the EXOC7 gene. It was formerly known as Exo70.

It forms one subunit of the exocyst complex. First discovered in Saccharomyces cerevisiae, this and other exocyst proteins have been observed in several other eukaryotes, including humans. In S. cerevisiae, the exocyst complex is involved in the late stages of exocytosis, and is localised at the tip of the bud, the major site of exocytosis in yeast. It interacts with the Rho3 GTPase. This interaction mediates one of the three known functions of Rho3 in cell polarity: vesicle docking and fusion with the plasma membrane (the other two functions are regulation of actin polarity and transport of exocytic vesicles from the mother cell to the bud). In humans, the functions of this protein and the exocyst complex are less well characterised: this protein is expressed in several tissues and is thought to also be involved in exocytosis.

== Interactions ==
EXOC7 has been shown to interact with EXOC4 and RHOQ.
