= DLGAP2 =

Protein-coding gene in the species Homo sapiens

Identifiers
- Aliases: DLGAP2, DAP2, SAPAP2, discs large homolog associated protein 2, DLG associated protein 2, C8orf68, ERICH1-AS1
- External IDs: OMIM: 605438; MGI: 2443181; GeneCards: DLGAP2

Gene location (Human)
Chr.	Chromosome 8 (human)
Band	8p23.3	Start	737,628 bp
Band	8p23.3	End	1,708,476 bp

Gene location (Mouse)
Chr.	Chromosome 8 (mouse)
Band	8|8 A1.1	Start	14,145,865 bp
Band	8|8 A1.1	End	14,897,680 bp
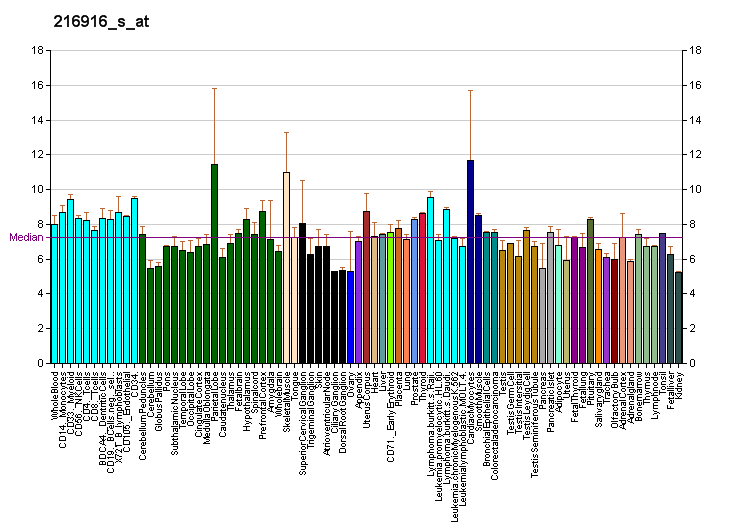
RNA expression pattern
Bgee	Human / Mouse (ortholog); Top expressed in: left testis; right testis; gonad; superior frontal gyrus; testicle; primary visual cortex; corpus callosum; prefrontal cortex; dorsolateral prefrontal cortex; Brodmann area 9 / Top expressed in: lumbar subsegment of spinal cord; superior frontal gyrus; primary visual cortex; dorsal striatum; nucleus accumbens; dentate gyrus of hippocampal formation granule cell; zygote; primary motor cortex; tail of embryo; prefrontal cortex; More reference expression data
BioGPS	More reference expression data
Gene ontology
Molecular function	protein binding; protein domain specific binding
Cellular component	cell junction; postsynaptic membrane; membrane; postsynaptic density; neurofilament; plasma membrane; synapse
Biological process	signaling; neuron-neuron synaptic transmission
Sources:Amigo / QuickGO
Orthologs
Databases	NCBI: entry; OMA: entry
Species	Human	Mouse
Entrez	9228	244310
Ensembl	ENSG00000274161; ENSG00000282152; ENSG00000282318; ENSG00000198010; ENSG00000282103 n/a	ENSMUSG00000047495
UniProt	Q9P1A6	Q8BJ42
RefSeq (mRNA)	NM_001277161; NM_001346810; NM_004745	NM_001145965; NM_172910
RefSeq (protein)	NP_001333739	NP_001139437; NP_766498
Location (UCSC)	Chr 8: 0.74 – 1.71 Mb	Chr 8: 14.15 – 14.9 Mb
PubMed search
- Wikidata
View/Edit Human	View/Edit Mouse

Disks large-associated protein 2 is a protein that in humans is encoded by the DLGAP2 gene.

== Function ==
The product of this gene is one of the membrane-associated guanylate kinases localized at postsynaptic density in neuronal cells. These kinases are a family of signaling molecules expressed at various submembrane domains and contain the PDZ, SH3 and the guanylate kinase domains. This protein may play a role in the molecular organization of synapses and in neuronal cell signaling. Alternatively spliced transcript variants encoding different isoforms have been identified, but their full-length nature is not known.

== Interactions ==
DLGAP2 has been shown to interact with DLG4, the canonical synapse marker protein, which in turn binds to N-Methyl-d-aspartate (NMDA) receptors and Shaker-type K+ channels.

== Clinical significance ==
As with many other synaptic genes, including its binding partner SHANK2, DLGAP2 has been shown to be associated with autism.
