= EXOC3 =

Protein-coding gene in the species Homo sapiens

Identifiers
- Aliases: EXOC3, SEC6, SEC6L1, Sec6p, exocyst complex component 3
- External IDs: OMIM: 608186; MGI: 2443972; HomoloGene: 38296; GeneCards: EXOC3; OMA:EXOC3 - orthologs

Gene location (Human)
Chr.	Chromosome 5 (human)
Band	5p15.33	Start	443,175 bp
Band	5p15.33	End	471,937 bp

Gene location (Mouse)
Chr.	Chromosome 13 (mouse)
Band	13|13 C1	Start	74,317,607 bp
Band	13|13 C1	End	74,356,851 bp
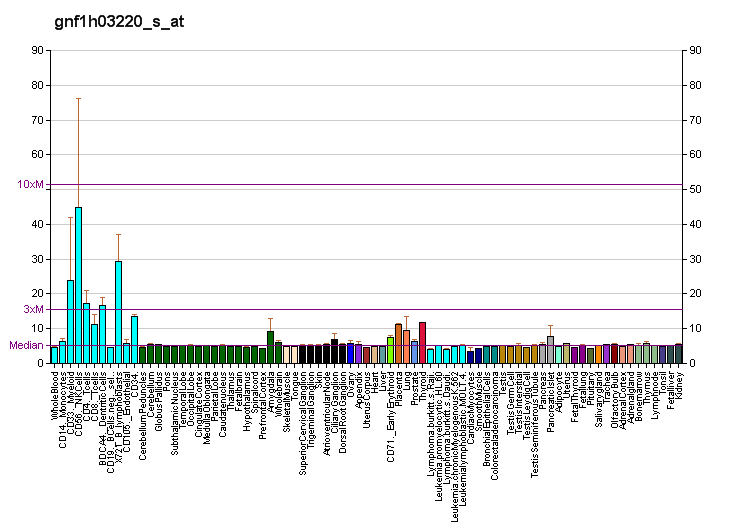

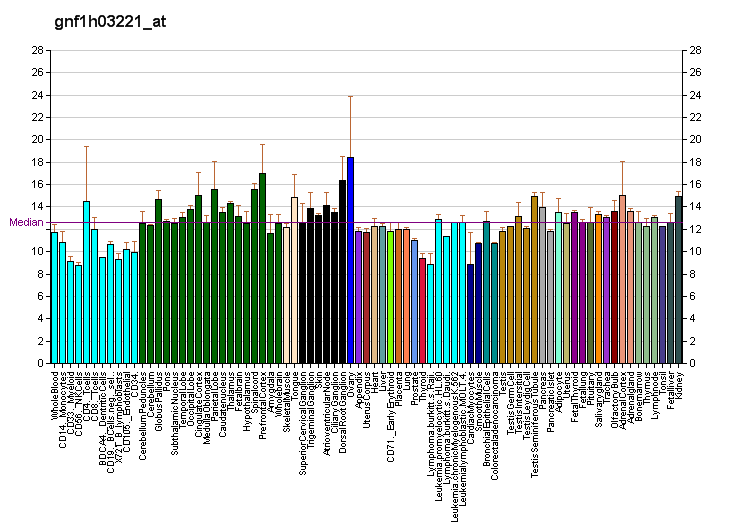

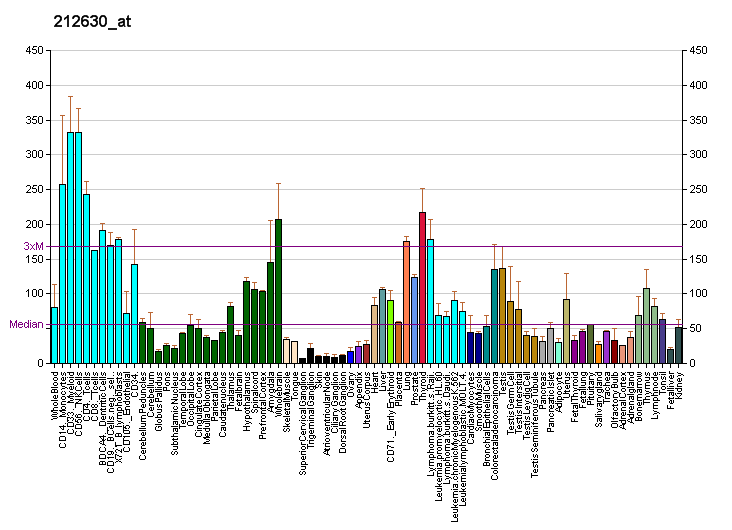
RNA expression pattern
Bgee	Human / Mouse (ortholog); Top expressed in: mucosa of transverse colon; anterior pituitary; sural nerve; gastric mucosa; right uterine tube; skin of leg; skin of abdomen; body of stomach; left testis; muscle layer of sigmoid colon / Top expressed in: hand; internal carotid artery; external carotid artery; otolith organ; facial motor nucleus; utricle; dentate gyrus of hippocampal formation granule cell; Region I of hippocampus proper; renal corpuscle; neural layer of retina; More reference expression data
BioGPS	More reference expression data
Gene ontology
Molecular function	protein binding; SNARE binding; cadherin binding
Cellular component	cytosol; exocyst; secretory granule membrane; cytoplasm; Golgi apparatus; growth cone; midbody; cell projection; perinuclear region of cytoplasm; presynaptic membrane
Biological process	protein transport; exocyst localization; exocytosis
Sources:Amigo / QuickGO
Orthologs
Species	Human	Mouse
Entrez	11336	211446
Ensembl	ENSG00000180104	ENSMUSG00000034152
UniProt	O60645	Q6KAR6
RefSeq (mRNA)	NM_007277	NM_177333
RefSeq (protein)	NP_009208	NP_796307
Location (UCSC)	Chr 5: 0.44 – 0.47 Mb	Chr 13: 74.32 – 74.36 Mb
PubMed search
- Wikidata
View/Edit Human	View/Edit Mouse

Exocyst complex component 3 is a protein that in humans is encoded by the EXOC3 gene.

== Function ==
The protein encoded by this gene is a component of the exocyst complex, a multiple protein complex essential for targeting exocytic vesicles to specific docking sites on the plasma membrane. Though best characterized in yeast, the component proteins and functions of exocyst complex have been demonstrated to be highly conserved in higher eukaryotes. At least eight components of the exocyst complex, including this protein, are found to interact with the actin cytoskeletal remodeling and vesicle transport machinery. The complex is also essential for the biogenesis of epithelial cell surface polarity.

== Interactions ==
EXOC3 has been shown to interact with DLG3 and EXOC4.
