= EXOC4 =

Protein-coding gene in the species Homo sapiens

Identifiers
- Aliases: EXOC4, SEC8, SEC8L1, Sec8p, exocyst complex component 4
- External IDs: OMIM: 608185; MGI: 1096376; HomoloGene: 40654; GeneCards: EXOC4; OMA:EXOC4 - orthologs

Gene location (Human)
Chr.	Chromosome 7 (human)
Band	7q33	Start	133,253,073 bp
Band	7q33	End	134,066,589 bp

Gene location (Mouse)
Chr.	Chromosome 6 (mouse)
Band	6 A3.3|6 14.59 cM	Start	33,226,020 bp
Band	6 A3.3|6 14.59 cM	End	33,950,914 bp
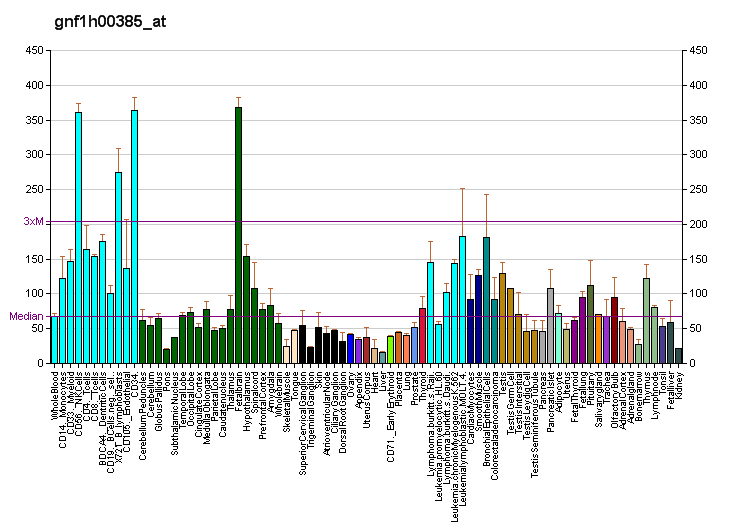

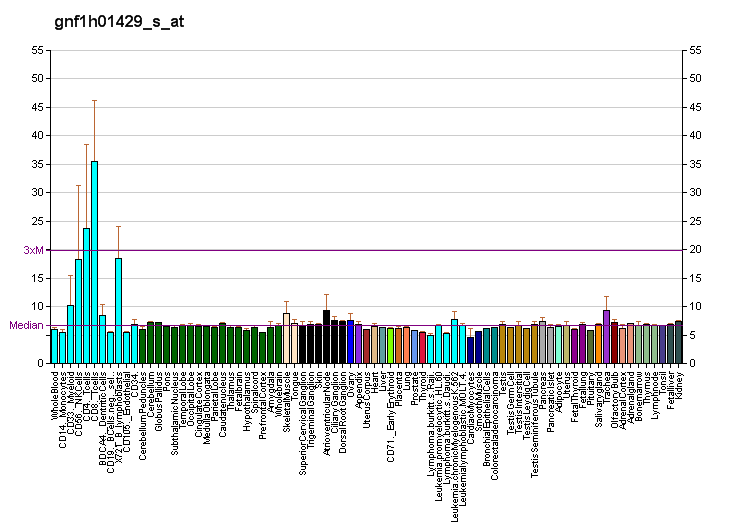
RNA expression pattern
Bgee	Human / Mouse (ortholog); Top expressed in: bone marrow cells; Achilles tendon; epithelium of colon; ventricular zone; ganglionic eminence; skin of arm; deltoid muscle; sural nerve; tibialis anterior muscle; Skeletal muscle tissue of rectus abdominis / Top expressed in: Rostral migratory stream; fossa; internal carotid artery; Epithelium of choroid plexus; external carotid artery; condyle; epithelium of lens; calvaria; substantia nigra; lateral septal nucleus; More reference expression data
BioGPS	More reference expression data
Gene ontology
Molecular function	PDZ domain binding; protein binding; protein N-terminus binding
Cellular component	cytoplasm; myelin sheath abaxonal region; microvillus; cytosol; plasma membrane; membrane; exocyst; growth cone membrane; synapse; cell projection; Flemming body
Biological process	protein transport; paraxial mesoderm formation; regulation of macroautophagy; vesicle docking involved in exocytosis; protein targeting to membrane; exocytosis; Golgi to plasma membrane transport; vesicle targeting; chemical synaptic transmission; transport; vesicle tethering involved in exocytosis
Sources:Amigo / QuickGO
Orthologs
Species	Human	Mouse
Entrez	60412	20336
Ensembl	ENSG00000131558	ENSMUSG00000029763
UniProt	Q96A65	O35382
RefSeq (mRNA)	NM_001037126; NM_021807	NM_009148; NM_001347089
RefSeq (protein)	NP_001032203; NP_068579	NP_001334018; NP_033174
Location (UCSC)	Chr 7: 133.25 – 134.07 Mb	Chr 6: 33.23 – 33.95 Mb
PubMed search
- Wikidata
View/Edit Human	View/Edit Mouse

Exocyst complex component 4 is a protein that in humans is encoded by the EXOC4 gene.

== Function ==
The protein encoded by this gene is a component of the exocyst complex, a multiple protein complex essential for targeting exocytic vesicles to specific docking sites on the plasma membrane. Though best characterized in yeast, the component proteins and functions of exocyst complex have been demonstrated to be highly conserved in higher eukaryotes. At least eight components of the exocyst complex, including this protein, are found to interact with the actin cytoskeletal remodeling and vesicle transport machinery. The complex is also essential for the biogenesis of epithelial cell surface polarity. Alternate transcriptional splice variants, encoding different isoforms, have been characterized.

== Interactions ==
EXOC4 has been shown to interact with:

- DLG3,
- DLG4,
- EXOC3,
- EXOC7, and
- GRIN2B.
