= CALML3 =

Protein-coding gene in humans

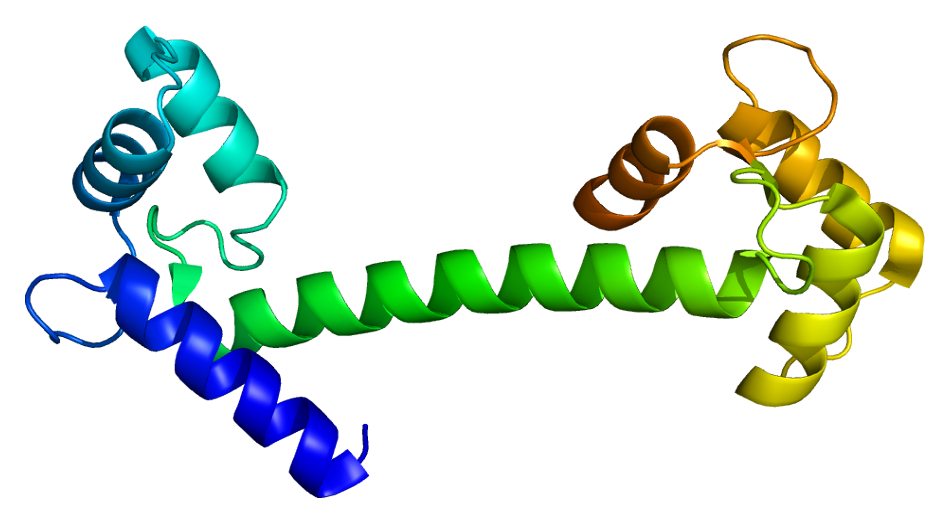

Identifiers
- Aliases: CALML3, CLP, calmodulin like 3
- External IDs: OMIM: 114184; MGI: 1917655; GeneCards: CALML3
Available structures
PDB	Ortholog search: PDBe RCSB
PDB	List of PDB id codes 1GGZ

Gene location (Human)
Chr.	Chromosome 10 (human)
Band	10p15.1	Start	5,524,961 bp
Band	10p15.1	End	5,526,771 bp

Gene location (Mouse)
Chr.	Chromosome 13 (mouse)
Band	13|13 A1	Start	3,852,896 bp
Band	13|13 A1	End	3,854,316 bp
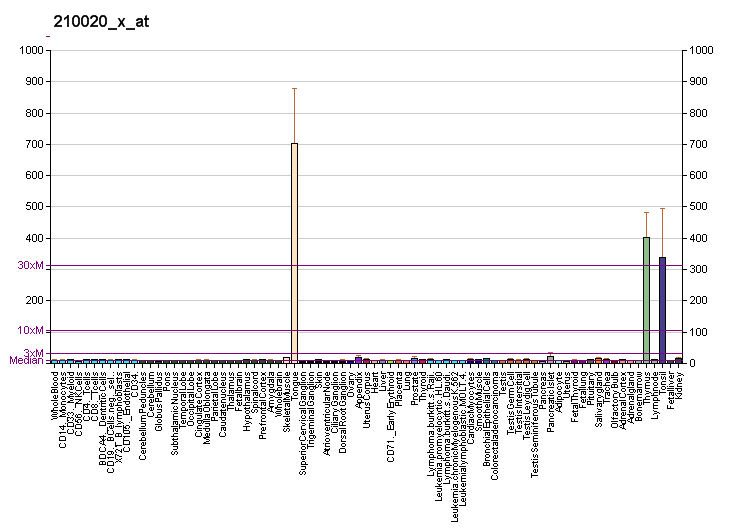

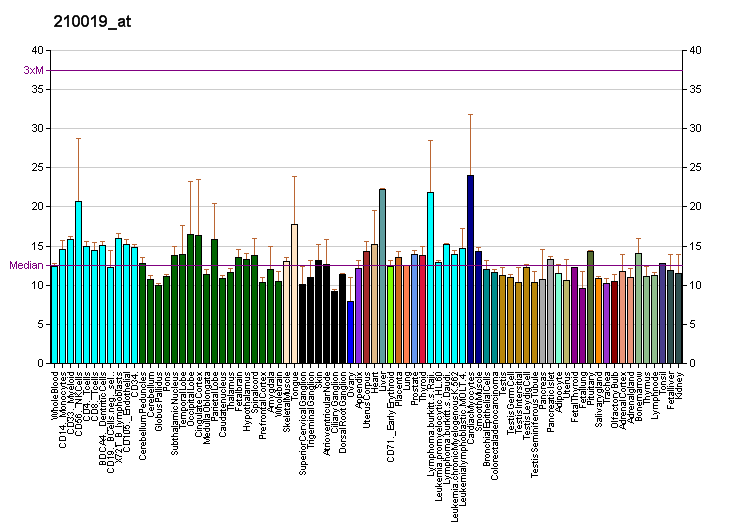
RNA expression pattern
Bgee	Human / Mouse (ortholog); Top expressed in: gums; gingival epithelium; vulva; skin of arm; mucosa of pharynx; oral cavity; skin of leg; skin of abdomen; cervix epithelium; hair follicle / Top expressed in: conjunctival fornix; lip; esophagus; cornea; skin of external ear; ciliary body; skin of back; umbilical cord; parotid gland; skin of abdomen; More reference expression data
BioGPS	More reference expression data
Gene ontology
Molecular function	metal ion binding; protein binding; calcium ion binding
Cellular component	extracellular exosome; nucleus
Biological process	calcium-mediated signaling; spindle pole body organization
Sources:Amigo / QuickGO
Orthologs
Databases	NCBI: entry; OMA: entry
Species	Human	Mouse
Entrez	810	70405
Ensembl	ENSG00000178363	ENSMUSG00000063130
UniProt	P27482	Q9D6P8
RefSeq (mRNA)	NM_005185	NM_027416
RefSeq (protein)	NP_005176	NP_081692
Location (UCSC)	Chr 10: 5.52 – 5.53 Mb	Chr 13: 3.85 – 3.85 Mb
PubMed search
- Wikidata
View/Edit Human	View/Edit Mouse

Calmodulin-like protein 3 is a protein that in humans is encoded by the CALML3 gene.
