= EXOC1 =

Protein-coding gene in the species Homo sapiens

Identifiers
- Aliases: EXOC1, BM-102, SEC3, SEC3L1, SEC3P, exocyst complex component 1
- External IDs: OMIM: 607879; MGI: 2445020; HomoloGene: 41241; GeneCards: EXOC1; OMA:EXOC1 - orthologs

Gene location (Human)
Chr.	Chromosome 4 (human)
Band	4q12	Start	55,853,648 bp
Band	4q12	End	55,905,086 bp

Gene location (Mouse)
Chr.	Chromosome 5 (mouse)
Band	5 C3.3|5	Start	76,529,311 bp
Band	5 C3.3|5	End	76,570,294 bp
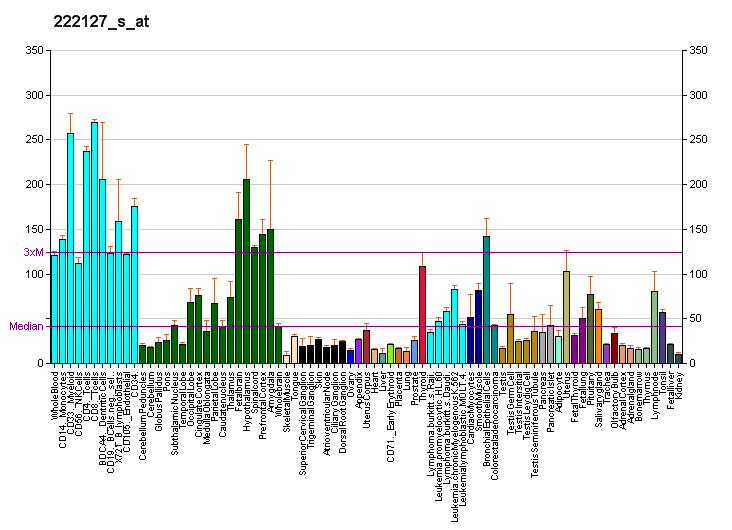
RNA expression pattern
Bgee	Human / Mouse (ortholog); Top expressed in: gingival epithelium; skin of thigh; skin of hip; oral cavity; Achilles tendon; mucosa of sigmoid colon; parietal pleura; visceral pleura; inferior olivary nucleus; germinal epithelium / Top expressed in: neural layer of retina; zygote; secondary oocyte; granulocyte; tail of embryo; dentate gyrus of hippocampal formation granule cell; spermatocyte; ventricular zone; genital tubercle; superior frontal gyrus; More reference expression data
BioGPS	More reference expression data
Gene ontology
Molecular function	phosphatidylinositol-4,5-bisphosphate binding; protein binding
Cellular component	cytoplasmic side of apical plasma membrane; cytosol; plasma membrane; membrane; exocyst; cytoplasm; perinuclear region of cytoplasm; Flemming body
Biological process	protein transport; exocyst localization; Golgi to plasma membrane transport; regulation of macroautophagy; phosphatidylinositol-mediated signaling; positive regulation of protein secretion; exocytosis; transport; viral process; defense response to virus
Sources:Amigo / QuickGO
Orthologs
Species	Human	Mouse
Entrez	55763	69940
Ensembl	ENSG00000090989	ENSMUSG00000036435
UniProt	Q9NV70	Q8R3S6
RefSeq (mRNA)	NM_001024924; NM_018261; NM_178237	NM_001289770; NM_001289771; NM_027270; NM_001359370; NM_001359372 NM_001359373
RefSeq (protein)	NP_001020095; NP_060731; NP_839955	NP_001276699; NP_001276700; NP_081546; NP_001346299; NP_001346301 NP_001346302; NP_001388254; NP_001388255
Location (UCSC)	Chr 4: 55.85 – 55.91 Mb	Chr 5: 76.53 – 76.57 Mb
PubMed search
- Wikidata
View/Edit Human	View/Edit Mouse

Exocyst complex component 1 is a protein that in humans is encoded by the EXOC1 gene.

The protein encoded by this gene is a component of the exocyst complex, a multiple protein complex essential for targeting exocytic vesicles to specific docking sites on the plasma membrane. Though best characterized in yeast, the component proteins and functions of the exocyst complex have been demonstrated to be highly conserved in higher eukaryotes. At least eight components of the exocyst complex, including this protein, are found to interact with the actin cytoskeletal remodeling and vesicle transport machinery. Alternatively spliced transcript variants encoding distinct isoforms have been described.
