= EXOC6 =

Protein-coding gene in the species Homo sapiens

Identifiers
- Aliases: EXOC6, EXOC6A, SEC15, SEC15L, SEC15L1, SEC15L3, Sec15p, exocyst complex component 6
- External IDs: OMIM: 609672; MGI: 1351611; HomoloGene: 41305; GeneCards: EXOC6; OMA:EXOC6 - orthologs

Gene location (Human)
Chr.	Chromosome 10 (human)
Band	10q23.33	Start	92,826,831 bp
Band	10q23.33	End	93,059,493 bp

Gene location (Mouse)
Chr.	Chromosome 19 (mouse)
Band	19 C2|19 32.32 cM	Start	37,509,327 bp
Band	19 C2|19 32.32 cM	End	37,672,507 bp
RNA expression pattern
Bgee	Human / Mouse (ortholog); Top expressed in: deltoid muscle; pancreatic epithelial cell; vastus lateralis muscle; middle temporal gyrus; tibialis anterior muscle; buccal mucosa cell; Skeletal muscle tissue of biceps brachii; Skeletal muscle tissue of rectus abdominis; islet of Langerhans; placenta / Top expressed in: soleus muscle; extraocular muscle; digastric muscle; sternocleidomastoid muscle; temporal muscle; intercostal muscle; triceps brachii muscle; granulocyte; thoracic diaphragm; Region I of hippocampus proper; More reference expression data
BioGPS	n/a
Gene ontology
Molecular function	protein binding
Cellular component	cytosol; plasma membrane; exocyst; cytoplasm; growth cone; cell projection; perinuclear region of cytoplasm; Flemming body; membrane
Biological process	protein transport; vesicle docking involved in exocytosis; exocytosis; Golgi to plasma membrane transport
Sources:Amigo / QuickGO
Orthologs
Species	Human	Mouse
Entrez	54536	107371
Ensembl	ENSG00000138190	ENSMUSG00000053799
UniProt	Q8TAG9	Q8R313
RefSeq (mRNA)	NM_001013848; NM_019053; NM_001319194; NM_001319195; NM_001319200	NM_175353
RefSeq (protein)	NP_001013870; NP_001306123; NP_001306124; NP_001306129; NP_061926	n/a
Location (UCSC)	Chr 10: 92.83 – 93.06 Mb	Chr 19: 37.51 – 37.67 Mb
PubMed search
- Wikidata
View/Edit Human	View/Edit Mouse

Exocyst complex component 6 is a protein that in humans is encoded by the EXOC6 gene.

== Function ==
The protein encoded by this gene is highly similar to the Saccharomyces cerevisiae SEC15 gene product, which is essential for vesicular traffic from the Golgi apparatus to the cell surface in yeast. It is one of the components of a multiprotein complex required for exocytosis. The 5' portion of this gene and two neighboring cytochrome p450 genes are included in a deletion that results in an autosomal dominant form of nonsyndromic optic nerve aplasia (ONA). Alternative splicing and the use of alternative promoters results in multiple transcript variants. A paralogous gene encoding a similar protein is present on chromosome 2.
