= EXOC2 =

Protein-coding gene in the species Homo sapiens

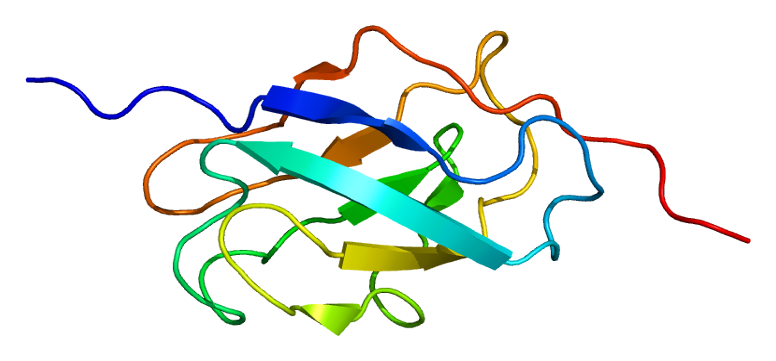

Identifiers
- Aliases: EXOC2, SEC5, SEC5L1, Sec5p, exocyst complex component 2, NEDFACH
- External IDs: OMIM: 615329; MGI: 1913732; GeneCards: EXOC2
Available structures
PDB	Ortholog search: PDBe RCSB
PDB	List of PDB id codes 1HK6

Gene location (Human)
Chr.	Chromosome 6 (human)
Band	6p25.3	Start	485,154 bp
Band	6p25.3	End	693,139 bp

Gene location (Mouse)
Chr.	Chromosome 13 (mouse)
Band	13|13 A3.2	Start	30,997,902 bp
Band	13|13 A3.2	End	31,158,076 bp
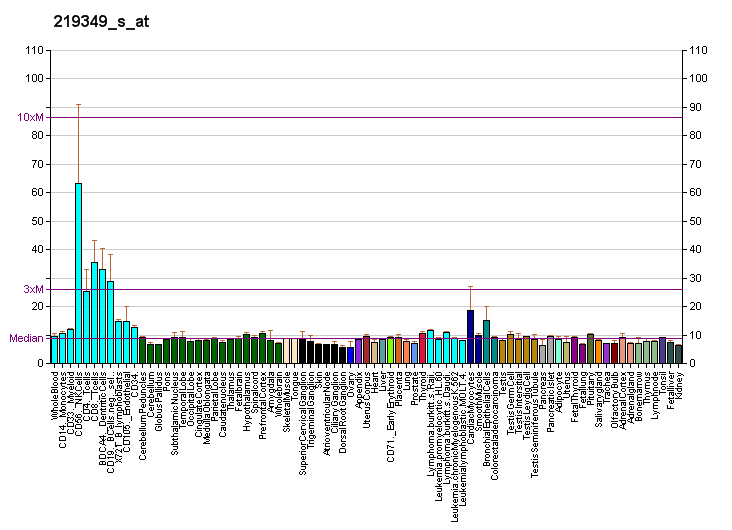
RNA expression pattern
Bgee	Human / Mouse (ortholog); Top expressed in: testicle; middle temporal gyrus; gonad; secondary oocyte; Brodmann area 23; islet of Langerhans; ganglionic eminence; Achilles tendon; stromal cell of endometrium; primary visual cortex / Top expressed in: hand; genital tubercle; otolith organ; utricle; superior cervical ganglion; granulocyte; zygote; spermatocyte; spermatid; tail of embryo; More reference expression data
BioGPS	More reference expression data
Gene ontology
Molecular function	protein binding; protein kinase binding; protein N-terminus binding
Cellular component	cytosol; plasma membrane; exocyst; membrane; Flemming body
Biological process	protein transport; regulation of entry of bacterium into host cell; Golgi to plasma membrane transport; exocyst assembly; exocytosis; transport; vesicle-mediated transport
Sources:Amigo / QuickGO
Orthologs
Databases	NCBI: entry; OMA: entry
Species	Human	Mouse
Entrez	55770	66482
Ensembl	ENSG00000112685	ENSMUSG00000021357
UniProt	Q96KP1	Q9D4H1
RefSeq (mRNA)	NM_018303	NM_025588; NM_001360093
RefSeq (protein)	NP_060773	NP_079864; NP_001347022
Location (UCSC)	Chr 6: 0.49 – 0.69 Mb	Chr 13: 31 – 31.16 Mb
PubMed search
- Wikidata
View/Edit Human	View/Edit Mouse

Exocyst complex component 2 is a protein that in humans is encoded by the EXOC2 gene.

The protein encoded by this gene is a component of the exocyst complex, a multiple protein complex essential for targeting exocytic vesicles to specific docking sites on the plasma membrane. Though best characterized in yeast, the component proteins and the functions of the exocyst complex have been demonstrated to be highly conserved in higher eukaryotes. At least eight components of the exocyst complex, including this protein, are found to interact with the actin cytoskeletal remodeling and vesicle transport machinery. This interaction has been shown to mediate filopodia formation in fibroblasts.
