= EXOC8 =

Protein-coding gene in humans

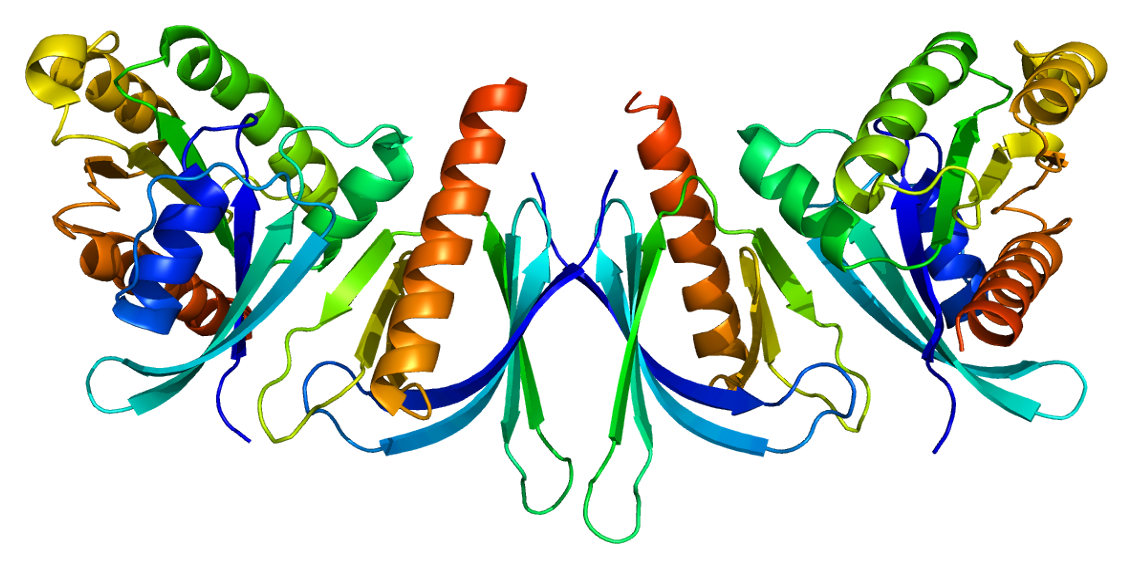

Identifiers
- Aliases: EXOC8, EXO84, Exo84p, SEC84, exocyst complex component 8, NEDMISB
- External IDs: OMIM: 615283; MGI: 2142527; GeneCards: EXOC8

Gene location (Human)
Chr.	Chromosome 1 (human)
Band	1q42.2	Start	231,332,753 bp
Band	1q42.2	End	231,337,852 bp

Gene location (Mouse)
Chr.	Chromosome 8 (mouse)
Band	8|8 E2	Start	125,619,847 bp
Band	8|8 E2	End	125,624,444 bp
RNA expression pattern
Bgee	Human / Mouse (ortholog); Top expressed in: pancreatic epithelial cell; deltoid muscle; endothelial cell; germinal epithelium; parietal pleura; skin of thigh; Brodmann area 23; visceral pleura; amniotic fluid; tibialis anterior muscle / Top expressed in: spermatocyte; pineal gland; parotid gland; epithelium of stomach; lacrimal gland; brown adipose tissue; conjunctival fornix; stroma of bone marrow; seminal vesicula; ciliary body; More reference expression data
BioGPS	n/a
Gene ontology
Molecular function	protein binding
Cellular component	late endosome; cell projection; membrane; growth cone; plasma membrane; exocyst; cytoplasm; cytosol; perinuclear region of cytoplasm; cell leading edge
Biological process	extracellular matrix disassembly; endosome organization; exocyst localization; exocyst assembly; protein transport; regulation of macroautophagy; exocytosis; transport; Golgi to plasma membrane transport; protein localization
Sources:Amigo / QuickGO
Orthologs
Databases	NCBI: entry; OMA: entry
Species	Human	Mouse
Entrez	149371	102058
Ensembl	ENSG00000116903	ENSMUSG00000074030
UniProt	Q8IYI6	Q6PGF7
RefSeq (mRNA)	NM_175876	NM_198103
RefSeq (protein)	NP_787072	NP_932771
Location (UCSC)	Chr 1: 231.33 – 231.34 Mb	Chr 8: 125.62 – 125.62 Mb
PubMed search
- Wikidata
View/Edit Human	View/Edit Mouse

Exocyst complex component 8 is a protein that in humans is encoded by the EXOC8 gene.

== Interactions ==
EXOC8 has been shown to interact with RALB.
