= PATJ =

PATJ may refer to:

- Tok Airport, airport code: PATJ
- InaD-like protein, a protein encoded by the PATJ gene
