= InaD-like protein =

Protein found in humans

PATJ
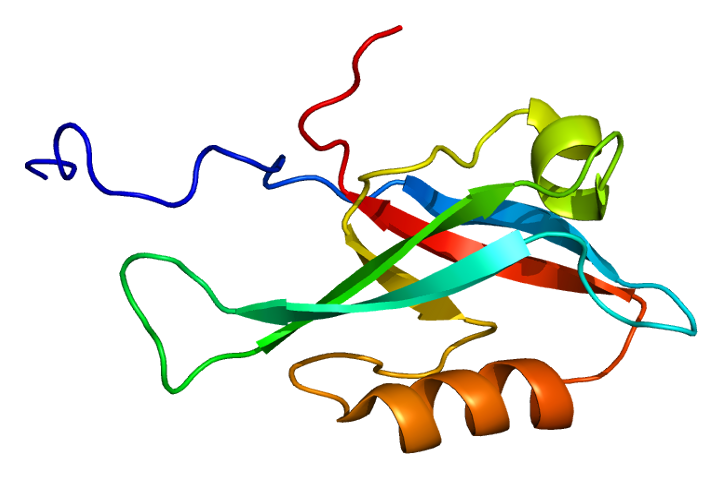

Identifiers
- Aliases: PATJ, Cipp, InaD-like, hINADL, INADL, crumbs cell polarity complex component, PATJ crumbs cell polarity complex component
- External IDs: OMIM: 603199; MGI: 1277960; GeneCards: PATJ
Available structures
PDB	Ortholog search: PDBe RCSB
PDB	List of PDB id codes 1VF6, 2D92, 2DAZ, 2DB5, 2DLU, 2DM8, 2DMZ, 2EHR, 4Q2N

Gene location (Human)
Chr.	Chromosome 1 (human)
Band	1p31.3	Start	61,742,477 bp
Band	1p31.3	End	62,178,675 bp

Gene location (Mouse)
Chr.	Chromosome 4 (mouse)
Band	4|4 C6	Start	98,284,022 bp
Band	4|4 C6	End	98,607,840 bp
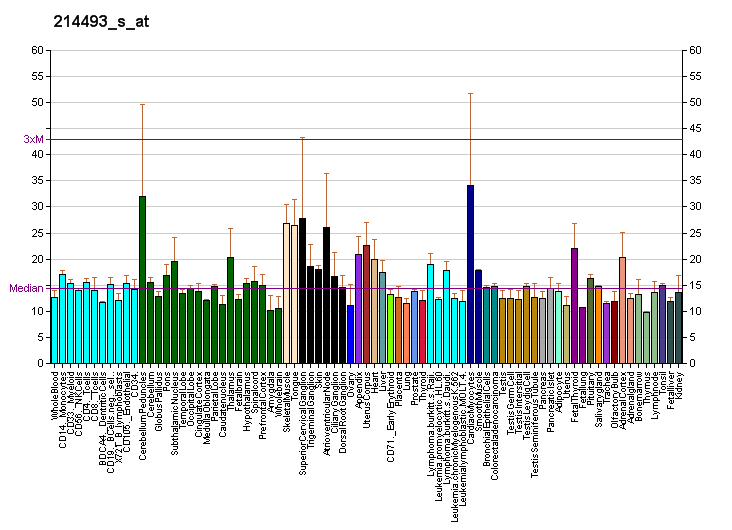

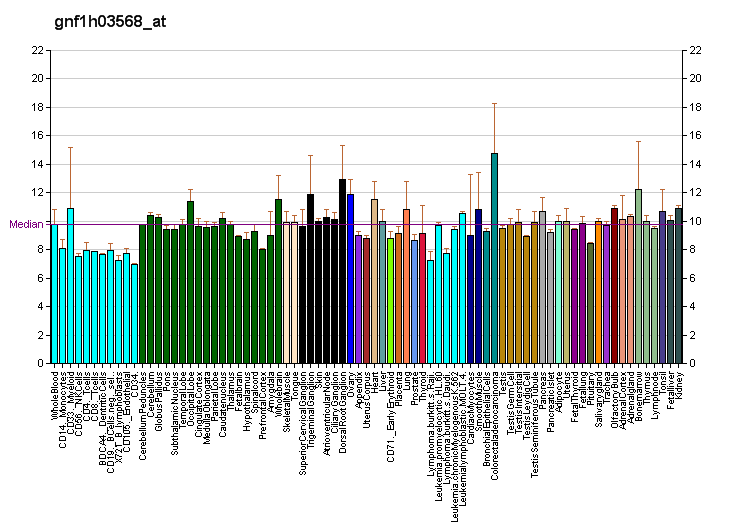

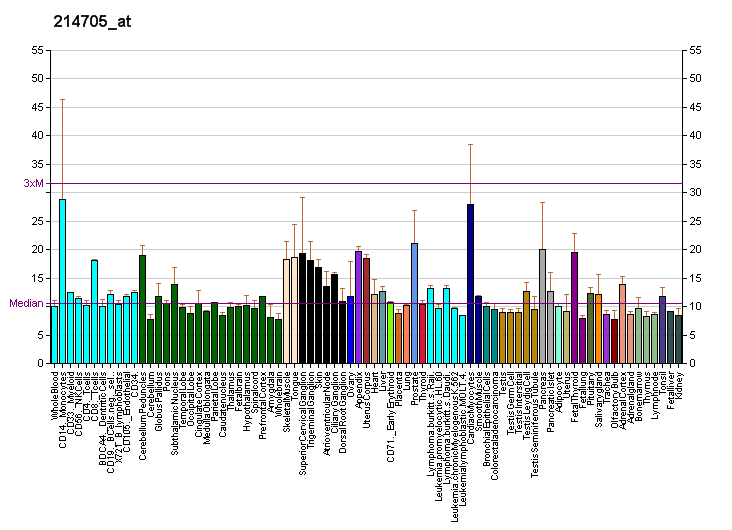
RNA expression pattern
Bgee	Human / Mouse (ortholog); Top expressed in: right ventricle; renal medulla; pons; cerebellar cortex; cerebellar hemisphere; Achilles tendon; right hemisphere of cerebellum; Skeletal muscle tissue of rectus abdominis; gingival epithelium; cerebellar vermis / Top expressed in: cerebellar vermis; lateral geniculate nucleus; lobe of cerebellum; medial dorsal nucleus; medial geniculate nucleus; motor neuron; facial motor nucleus; anterior horn of spinal cord; inferior colliculi; deep cerebellar nuclei; More reference expression data
BioGPS	More reference expression data
Gene ontology
Molecular function	protein binding
Cellular component	cytoplasm; perinuclear region of cytoplasm; plasma membrane; apical part of cell; extracellular exosome; apical plasma membrane; membrane; bicellular tight junction; centrosome; microtubule organizing center; cytosol; cell junction; protein-containing complex
Biological process	intracellular signal transduction; bicellular tight junction assembly
Sources:Amigo / QuickGO
Orthologs
Databases	NCBI: entry; OMA: entry
Species	Human	Mouse
Entrez	10207	12695
Ensembl	ENSG00000132849	ENSMUSG00000061859
UniProt	Q8NI35	Q63ZW7
RefSeq (mRNA)	NM_005799; NM_176877; NM_176878; NM_001350145	NM_001005784; NM_001005787; NM_007704; NM_172696; NM_001355177
RefSeq (protein)	NP_795352; NP_001337074	NP_001005784; NP_001005787; NP_031730; NP_766284; NP_001342106
Location (UCSC)	Chr 1: 61.74 – 62.18 Mb	Chr 4: 98.28 – 98.61 Mb
PubMed search
- Wikidata
View/Edit Human	View/Edit Mouse

InaD-like protein is a protein that in humans is encoded by the PATJ gene.

== Function ==
This gene encodes a protein with multiple PDZ domains. PDZ domains mediate protein-protein interactions, and proteins with multiple PDZ domains often organize multimeric complexes at the plasma membrane. This protein localizes to tight junctions and to the apical membrane of epithelial cells. A similar protein in Drosophila is a scaffolding protein which tethers several members of a multimeric signaling complex in photoreceptors.

== Interactions ==
INADL has been shown to interact with MPP5.
