= PSMB6 =

Protein found in humans

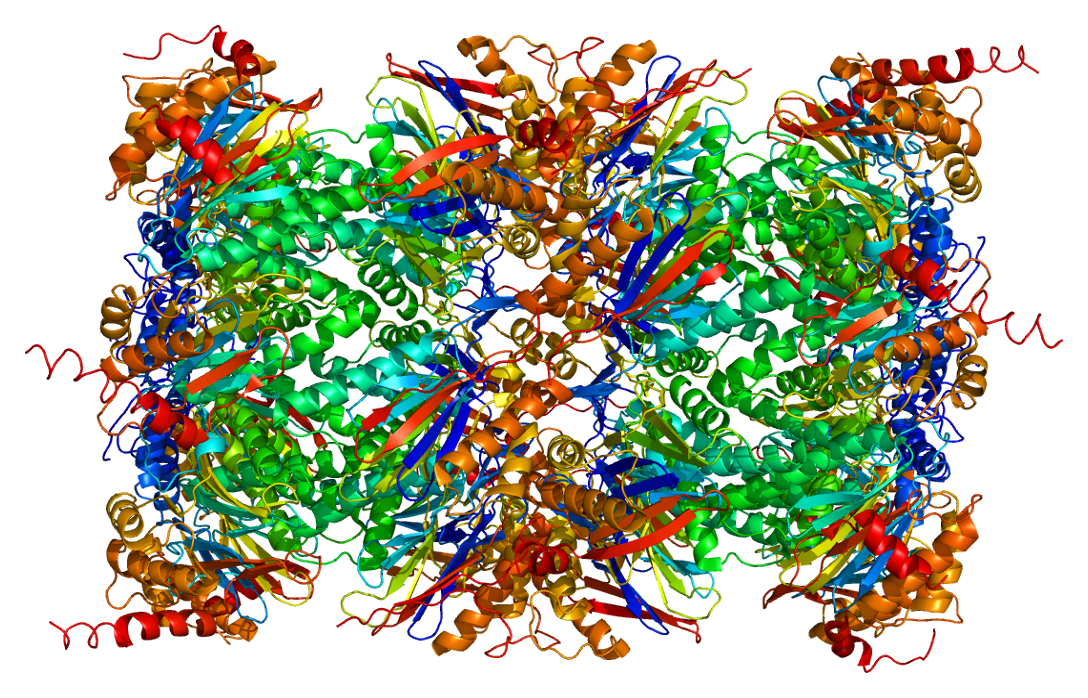

Identifiers
- Aliases: PSMB6, DELTA, LMPY, proteasome subunit beta 6, Y, proteasome 20S subunit beta 6
- External IDs: OMIM: 600307; MGI: 104880; GeneCards: PSMB6
Available structures
PDB	Ortholog search: PDBe RCSB
PDB	List of PDB id codes 4R3O, 4R67, 5A0Q
Enzyme activity
EC #	BRENDA	ExPASy	KEGG	MetaCyc
3.4.25.1	↗	↗	↗	↗

Gene location (Human)
Chr.	Chromosome 17 (human)
Band	17p13.2	Start	4,796,144 bp
Band	17p13.2	End	4,798,502 bp

Gene location (Mouse)
Chr.	Chromosome 11 (mouse)
Band	11 B3|11 42.99 cM	Start	70,416,193 bp
Band	11 B3|11 42.99 cM	End	70,418,684 bp
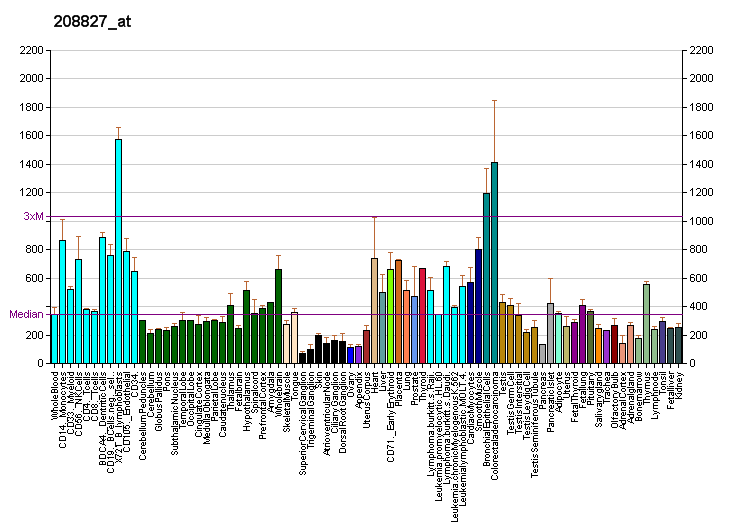
RNA expression pattern
Bgee	Human / Mouse (ortholog); Top expressed in: gastrocnemius muscle; muscle of thigh; body of tongue; apex of heart; left ventricle; islet of Langerhans; smooth muscle tissue; mucosa of pharynx; right auricle of heart; ventricular zone / Top expressed in: saccule; otic placode; otic vesicle; medial ganglionic eminence; primitive streak; somite; maxillary prominence; mandibular prominence; facial motor nucleus; blastocyst; More reference expression data
BioGPS	More reference expression data
Gene ontology
Molecular function	endopeptidase activity; peptidase activity; threonine-type endopeptidase activity; hydrolase activity; cadherin binding
Cellular component	nucleoplasm; proteasome complex; extracellular exosome; nucleus; proteasome core complex; cytoplasm; cytosol; proteasome core complex, beta-subunit complex
Biological process	regulation of cellular amino acid metabolic process; antigen processing and presentation of exogenous peptide antigen via MHC class I, TAP-dependent; regulation of mRNA stability; positive regulation of canonical Wnt signaling pathway; protein polyubiquitination; stimulatory C-type lectin receptor signaling pathway; tumor necrosis factor-mediated signaling pathway; MAPK cascade; proteolysis; Fc-epsilon receptor signaling pathway; NIK/NF-kappaB signaling; anaphase-promoting complex-dependent catabolic process; proteolysis involved in cellular protein catabolic process; T cell receptor signaling pathway; negative regulation of canonical Wnt signaling pathway; proteasome-mediated ubiquitin-dependent protein catabolic process; viral process; Wnt signaling pathway, planar cell polarity pathway; negative regulation of G2/M transition of mitotic cell cycle; protein deubiquitination; SCF-dependent proteasomal ubiquitin-dependent protein catabolic process; transmembrane transport; regulation of transcription from RNA polymerase II promoter in response to hypoxia; post-translational protein modification; regulation of hematopoietic stem cell differentiation; proteasomal protein catabolic process; proteasomal ubiquitin-independent protein catabolic process; interleukin-1-mediated signaling pathway; regulation of mitotic cell cycle phase transition
Sources:Amigo / QuickGO
Orthologs
Databases	NCBI: entry; OMA: entry
Species	Human	Mouse
Entrez	5694	19175
Ensembl	ENSG00000142507	ENSMUSG00000018286
UniProt	P28072	Q60692
RefSeq (mRNA)	NM_002798; NM_001270481	NM_008946
RefSeq (protein)	NP_001257410; NP_002789	NP_032972
Location (UCSC)	Chr 17: 4.8 – 4.8 Mb	Chr 11: 70.42 – 70.42 Mb
PubMed search
- Wikidata
View/Edit Human	View/Edit Mouse

Proteasome subunit beta type-6 also known as 20S proteasome subunit beta-1 (based on systematic nomenclature) is a protein that in humans is encoded by the PSMB6 gene.

This protein is one of the 17 essential subunits (alpha subunits 1-7, constitutive beta subunits 1-7, and inducible subunits including beta1i, beta2i, beta5i) that contributes to the complete assembly of 20S proteasome complex. In particular, proteasome subunit beta type-6, along with other beta subunits, assemble into two heptameric rings and subsequently a proteolytic chamber for substrate degradation. This protein contains "Caspase-like" activity and is capable of cleaving after acidic residues of peptide. The eukaryotic proteasome recognized degradable proteins, including damaged proteins for protein quality control purpose or key regulatory protein components for dynamic biological processes. An essential function of a modified proteasome, the immunoproteasome, is the processing of class I MHC peptides.

== Structure ==
=== Gene ===
The human gene contains 6 exons and is located at chromosome band 17p13.

=== Protein ===
The human protein proteasome subunit beta type-6 is 22 kDa in size and composed of 205 amino acids. The calculated theoretical pI of this protein is 4.91.

The 20S proteasome subunit beta-1 (systematic nomenclature) is originally expressed as a precursor with 239 amino acids. The fragment of 34 amino acids at peptide N-terminal is essential for proper protein folding and subsequent complex assembly. At the end-stage of complex assembly, the N-terminal fragment of beta1 subunit is cleaved, forming the mature beta1 subunit of 20S complex.

=== Complex assembly ===
The proteasome is a multicatalytic proteinase complex with a highly ordered 20S core structure. This barrel-shaped core structure is composed of 4 axially stacked rings of 28 non-identical subunits: the two end rings are each formed by 7 alpha subunits, and the two central rings are each formed by 7 beta subunits. Three beta subunits (beta1, beta2, beta5) each contains a proteolytic active site and has distinct substrate preferences. Proteasomes are distributed throughout eukaryotic cells at a high concentration and cleave peptides in an ATP/ubiquitin-dependent process in a non-lysosomal pathway.

== Function ==
The gene PSMB6 encodes a member of the proteasome B-type family, also known as the T1B family, that is a 20S core beta subunit in the proteasome. This catalytic subunit is not present in the immunoproteasome and is replaced by catalytic inducible subunit beta1i (proteasome beta 9 subunit).

The proteasomes are a pivotal component for the Ubiquitin-Proteasome System (UPS) and corresponding cellular Protein Quality Control (PQC). Compromised proteasome complex assembly leads to reduced proteolytic activities and accumulation of damaged or misfolded protein species. Such protein accumulation has become phenotypic characteristics of neurodegenerative diseases, cardiovascular diseases, and systemic DNA damage responses.

The function of this protein is supported by its tertiary structure and its interaction with associating partners. As one of 28 subunits of 20S proteasome, protein proteasome subunit beta type-2 contributes to form a proteolytic environment for substrate degradation. Evidences of the crystal structures of isolated 20S proteasome complex demonstrate that the two rings of beta subunits form a proteolytic chamber and maintain all their active sites of proteolysis within the chamber. Concomitantly, the rings of alpha subunits form the entrance for substrates entering the proteolytic chamber. In an inactivated 20S proteasome complex, the gate into the internal proteolytic chamber are guarded by the N-terminal tails of specific alpha-subunit. This unique structure design prevents random encounter between proteolytic active sites and protein substrate, which makes protein degradation a well-regulated process. 20S proteasome complex, by itself, is usually functionally inactive. The proteolytic capacity of 20S core particle (CP) can be activated when CP associates with one or two regulatory particles (RP) on one or both side of alpha rings. These regulatory particles include 19S proteasome complexes, 11S proteasome complex, etc. Following the CP-RP association, the confirmation of certain alpha subunits will change and consequently cause the opening of substrate entrance gate. Besides RPs, the 20S proteasomes can also be effectively activated by other mild chemical treatments, such as exposure to low levels of sodium dodecylsulfate (SDS) or NP-14.

== Clinical significance ==
The Proteasome and its subunits are of clinical significance for at least two reasons: (1) a compromised complex assembly or a dysfunctional proteasome can be associated with the underlying pathophysiology of specific diseases, and (2) they can be exploited as drug targets for therapeutic interventions. More recently, more effort has also been made to consider the proteasome for the development of novel diagnostic markers and strategies. An improved and comprehensive understanding of the pathophysiology of the proteasome should lead to important clinical applications in the future.

The proteasomes form a pivotal component for the Ubiquitin-Proteasome System (UPS) and corresponding cellular Protein Quality Control (PQC). Protein ubiquitination and subsequent proteolysis and degradation by the proteasome are important mechanisms in the regulation of the cell cycle, cell growth and differentiation, gene transcription, signal transduction and apoptosis. Subsequently, a compromised proteasome complex assembly and function lead to reduced proteolytic activities and the accumulation of damaged or misfolded protein species. Such protein accumulation may contribute to the pathogenesis and phenotypic characteristics in neurodegenerative diseases, cardiovascular diseases, inflammatory responses and autoimmune diseases, and systemic DNA damage responses leading to malignancies.

Several experimental and clinical studies have indicated that aberrations and deregulations of the UPS contribute to the pathogenesis of several neurodegenerative and myodegenerative disorders, including Alzheimer's disease, Parkinson's disease and Pick's disease, Amyotrophic lateral sclerosis (ALS), Huntington's disease, Creutzfeldt–Jakob disease, and motor neuron diseases, polyglutamine (PolyQ) diseases, Muscular dystrophies and several rare forms of neurodegenerative diseases associated with dementia. As part of the Ubiquitin-Proteasome System (UPS), the proteasome maintains cardiac protein homeostasis and thus plays a significant role in cardiac Ischemic injury, ventricular hypertrophy and Heart failure. Additionally, evidence is accumulating that the UPS plays an essential role in malignant transformation. UPS proteolysis plays a major role in responses of cancer cells to stimulatory signals that are critical for the development of cancer. Accordingly, gene expression by degradation of transcription factors, such as p53, c-Jun, c-Fos, NF-κB, c-Myc, HIF-1α, MATα2, STAT3, sterol-regulated element-binding proteins and androgen receptors are all controlled by the UPS and thus involved in the development of various malignancies. Moreover, the UPS regulates the degradation of tumor suppressor gene products such as adenomatous polyposis coli (APC) in colorectal cancer, retinoblastoma (Rb). and von Hippel-Lindau tumor suppressor (VHL), as well as a number of proto-oncogenes (Raf, Myc, Myb, Rel, Src, Mos, Abl). The UPS is also involved in the regulation of inflammatory responses. This activity is usually attributed to the role of proteasomes in the activation of NF-κB which further regulates the expression of pro inflammatory cytokines such as TNF-α, IL-β, IL-8, adhesion molecules (ICAM-1, VCAM-1, P-selectin) and prostaglandins and nitric oxide (NO). Additionally, the UPS also plays a role in inflammatory responses as regulators of leukocyte proliferation, mainly through proteolysis of cyclines and the degradation of CDK inhibitors. Lastly, autoimmune disease patients with SLE, Sjögren syndrome and rheumatoid arthritis (RA) predominantly exhibit circulating proteasomes which can be applied as clinical biomarkers.

As aforementioned, the proteasome subunit beta type-6, also known as 20S proteasome subunit beta-1, is a protein that is encoded by the PSMB6 gene in humans. A clinically important role of the PSMB6 protein has been mainly found in malignancies. For instance, pharmacological drug therapy with Periplocin in the treatment of rheumatoid arthritis, is also found to inhibit lung cancer in both in-vivo and in-vitro experimental models. Accordingly, the protein profile changes of human lung cancer cell lines A549 in response to periplocin treatment were investigated using proteomics approaches (2-DE combined with MS/MS) in conjunction with Western blot analysis to verify the changed proteins. Using immunoblot analysis followed by STRING bioinformatics analysis, it was revealed that Periplocin can inhibited growth of lung cancer by down-regulating proteins, such as ATP5F1A, EIF5A, ALDH1 and PSMB6. Thus, the proteasome subunit beta type-6 (PSMB6) appears to have a significant role in molecular mechanisms underlying the anti-cancer effects of periplocin on lung cancer cells. A proteomic study, analyzing differentially expressed UPS proteins in a rat model of chronic hypoxic pulmonary hypertension which is characterized by sustained elevation of pulmonary vascular resistance that results in vascular remodeling, revealed a significant association with the PSMB6 protein. Chronic hypoxia up-regulated the proteasome activity and the proliferation of pulmonary artery smooth muscle cells, which may be related to an increased PSMB6 expression and the subsequently enhanced functional catalytic sites of the proteasome. Thus, there may be an essential role of the proteasome during chronic hypoxic pulmonary hypertension.
