= PSMB7 =

Protein found in humans

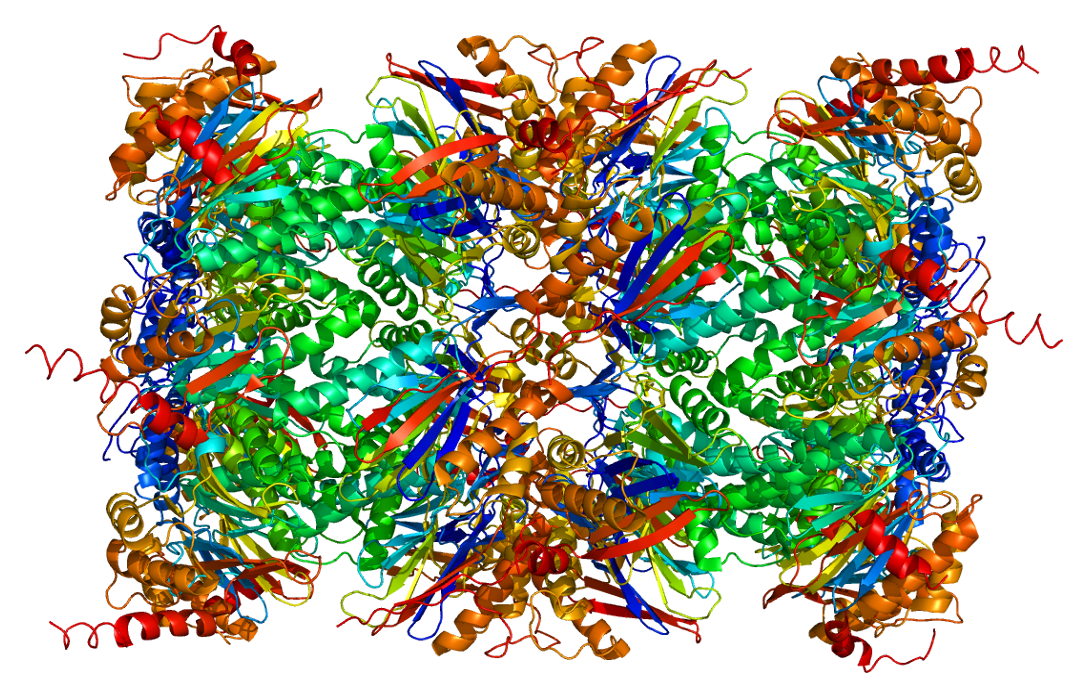

Identifiers
- Aliases: PSMB7, proteasome subunit beta 7, Z, proteasome 20S subunit beta 7
- External IDs: OMIM: 604030; MGI: 107637; GeneCards: PSMB7
Available structures
| PDB | Ortholog search: PDBe RCSB |
| PDB | List of PDB id codes 4R3O, 4R67, 5A0Q |
Enzyme activity
| EC # | BRENDA | ExPASy | KEGG | MetaCyc |
|---|---|---|---|---|
| 3.4.25.1 | ↗ | ↗ | ↗ | ↗ |

Gene location (Human)
| Chr. | Chromosome 9 (human) |
| Band | 9q33.3 | Start | 124,353,465 bp |
| Band | 9q33.3 | End | 124,415,444 bp |

Gene location (Mouse)
| Chr. | Chromosome 2 (mouse) |
| Band | 2 B|2 24.42 cM | Start | 38,478,048 bp |
| Band | 2 B|2 24.42 cM | End | 38,534,099 bp |
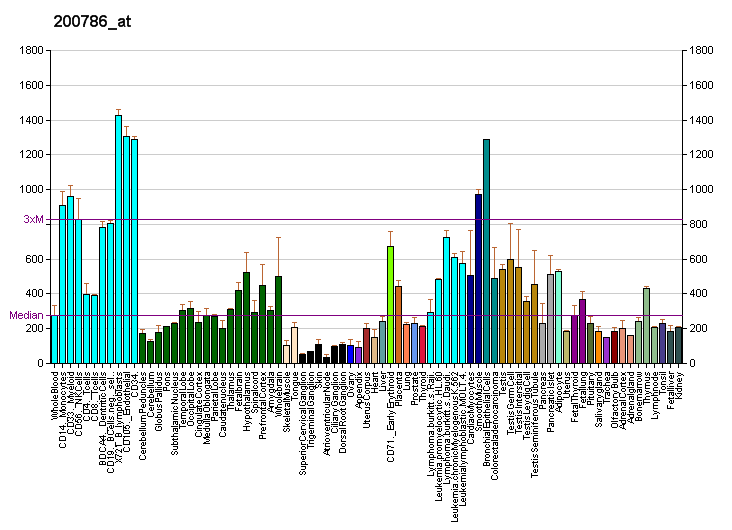
RNA expression pattern
| Bgee | Human / Mouse (ortholog); Top expressed in: ganglionic eminence; ventricular zone; left testis; right testis; right adrenal gland; left adrenal gland; skin of leg; right adrenal cortex; left adrenal cortex; skin of abdomen / Top expressed in: medial ganglionic eminence; somite; triceps brachii muscle; temporal muscle; mandibular prominence; digastric muscle; sternocleidomastoid muscle; maxillary prominence; right ventricle; optic nerve; More reference expression data |
| BioGPS | More reference expression data |
Gene ontology
| Molecular function | endopeptidase activity; peptidase activity; protein binding; threonine-type endopeptidase activity; hydrolase activity |
| Cellular component | nucleoplasm; proteasome complex; extracellular exosome; nucleus; proteasome core complex; extracellular region; cytoplasm; cytosol; secretory granule lumen; ficolin-1-rich granule lumen; proteasome core complex, beta-subunit complex |
| Biological process | regulation of cellular amino acid metabolic process; antigen processing and presentation of exogenous peptide antigen via MHC class I, TAP-dependent; regulation of mRNA stability; positive regulation of protein targeting to mitochondrion; positive regulation of canonical Wnt signaling pathway; protein polyubiquitination; stimulatory C-type lectin receptor signaling pathway; tumor necrosis factor-mediated signaling pathway; MAPK cascade; proteolysis; Fc-epsilon receptor signaling pathway; NIK/NF-kappaB signaling; anaphase-promoting complex-dependent catabolic process; proteolysis involved in cellular protein catabolic process; T cell receptor signaling pathway; negative regulation of canonical Wnt signaling pathway; Wnt signaling pathway, planar cell polarity pathway; proteasome-mediated ubiquitin-dependent protein catabolic process; viral process; negative regulation of G2/M transition of mitotic cell cycle; protein deubiquitination; SCF-dependent proteasomal ubiquitin-dependent protein catabolic process; neutrophil degranulation; transmembrane transport; regulation of transcription from RNA polymerase II promoter in response to hypoxia; post-translational protein modification; regulation of hematopoietic stem cell differentiation; proteasomal protein catabolic process; proteasomal ubiquitin-independent protein catabolic process; interleukin-1-mediated signaling pathway; regulation of mitotic cell cycle phase transition |
Sources:Amigo / QuickGO
Orthologs
| Databases | NCBI: entry; OMA: entry |
| Species | Human | Mouse |
| Entrez | 5695 | 19177 |
| Ensembl | ENSG00000136930 | ENSMUSG00000026750 |
| UniProt | Q99436; Q5TBG5 | P70195 |
| RefSeq (mRNA) | NM_002799 | NM_011187 |
| RefSeq (protein) | NP_002790 | NP_035317 |
| Location (UCSC) | Chr 9: 124.35 – 124.42 Mb | Chr 2: 38.48 – 38.53 Mb |
| PubMed search |
- Wikidata
| View/Edit Human | View/Edit Mouse |

Proteasome subunit beta type-7 as known as 20S proteasome subunit beta-2 is a protein that in humans is encoded by the PSMB7 gene.

This protein is one of the 17 essential subunits (alpha subunits 1-7, constitutive beta subunits 1-7, and inducible subunits including beta1i, beta2i, beta5i) that contributes to the complete assembly of 20S proteasome complex. In particular, proteasome subunit beta type-5, along with other beta subunits, assemble into two heptameric rings and subsequently a proteolytic chamber for substrate degradation. This protein contains "Trypsin-like" activity and is capable of cleaving after basic residues of peptide. The eukaryotic proteasome recognized degradable proteins, including damaged proteins for protein quality control purpose or key regulatory protein components for dynamic biological processes. An essential function of a modified proteasome, the immunoproteasome, is the processing of class I MHC peptides.

== Structure ==
=== Gene ===
The human PSMB7 gene has 8 exons and locates at chromosome band 9q34.11-q34.12.

=== Protein ===
The gene PSMB7 encodes a member of the proteasome B-type family, also known as the T1B family, that is a 20S core beta subunit in the proteasome. Expression of this catalytic subunit (beta 2, according to systematic nomenclature) is downregulated by gamma interferon due to an alternatively elevated expression of inducible subunit beta2i, which leads to augmented incorporation of beta2i instead of beta2 into the final assembled 20S complex. The human protein proteasome subunit beta type-7 is 25 kDa in size and composed of 234 amino acids. The calculated theoretical pI of this protein is 5.61.

=== Complex assembly ===
The proteasome is a multicatalytic proteinase complex with a highly ordered 20S core structure. This barrel-shaped core structure is composed of 4 axially stacked rings of 28 non-identical subunits: the two end rings are each formed by 7 alpha subunits, and the two central rings are each formed by 7 beta subunits. Three beta subunits (beta1, beta2, beta5) each contains a proteolytic active site and has distinct substrate preferences. Proteasomes are distributed throughout eukaryotic cells at a high concentration and cleave peptides in an ATP/ubiquitin-dependent process in a non-lysosomal pathway.

== Function ==
Protein functions are supported by its tertiary structure and its interaction with associating partners. As one of 28 subunits of 20S proteasome, protein proteasome subunit beta type-2 contributes to form a proteolytic environment for substrate degradation. Evidences of the crystal structures of isolated 20S proteasome complex demonstrate that the two rings of beta subunits form a proteolytic chamber and maintain all their active sites of proteolysis within the chamber. Concomitantly, the rings of alpha subunits form the entrance for substrates entering the proteolytic chamber. In an inactivated 20S proteasome complex, the gate into the internal proteolytic chamber are guarded by the N-terminal tails of specific alpha-subunit. This unique structure design prevents random encounter between proteolytic active sites and protein substrate, which makes protein degradation a well-regulated process. 20S proteasome complex, by itself, is usually functionally inactive. The proteolytic capacity of 20S core particle (CP) can be activated when CP associates with one or two regulatory particles (RP) on one or both side of alpha rings. These regulatory particles include 19S proteasome complexes, 11S proteasome complex, etc. Following the CP-RP association, the confirmation of certain alpha subunits will change and consequently cause the opening of substrate entrance gate. Besides RPs, the 20S proteasomes can also be effectively activated by other mild chemical treatments, such as exposure to low levels of sodium dodecylsulfate (SDS) or NP-14.

The 20S proteasome subunit beta-2 (systematic nomenclature) is originally expressed as a precursor with 277 amino acids. The fragment of 43 amino acids at peptide N-terminal is essential for proper protein folding and subsequent complex assembly. At the end-stage of complex assembly, the N-terminal fragment of beta5 subunit is cleaved, forming the mature beta2 subunit of 20S complex. During the basal assembly, and proteolytic processing is required to generate a mature subunit. This subunit is not present in the immunoproteasome and is replaced by catalytic subunit 2i (proteasome beta 10 subunit).

== Clinical significance ==
The proteasome and its subunits are of clinical significance for at least two reasons: (1) a compromised complex assembly or a dysfunctional proteasome can be associated with the underlying pathophysiology of specific diseases, and (2) they can be exploited as drug targets for therapeutic interventions. More recently, more effort has been made to consider the proteasome for the development of novel diagnostic markers and strategies. An improved and comprehensive understanding of the pathophysiology of the proteasome should lead to clinical applications in the future.

The proteasomes form a pivotal component for the ubiquitin–proteasome system (UPS) and corresponding cellular Protein Quality Control (PQC). Protein ubiquitination and subsequent proteolysis and degradation by the proteasome are important mechanisms in the regulation of the cell cycle, cell growth and differentiation, gene transcription, signal transduction and apoptosis. Subsequently, a compromised proteasome complex assembly and function lead to reduced proteolytic activities and the accumulation of damaged or misfolded protein species. Such protein accumulation may contribute to the pathogenesis and phenotypic characteristics in neurodegenerative diseases, cardiovascular diseases, inflammatory responses and autoimmune diseases, and systemic DNA damage responses leading to malignancies.

Several experimental and clinical studies have indicated that aberrations and deregulations of the UPS contribute to the pathogenesis of several neurodegenerative and myodegenerative disorders, including Alzheimer's disease, Parkinson's disease and Pick's disease, Amyotrophic lateral sclerosis (ALS), Huntington's disease, Creutzfeldt–Jakob disease, and motor neuron diseases, polyglutamine (PolyQ) diseases, Muscular dystrophies and several rare forms of neurodegenerative diseases associated with dementia. As part of the ubiquitin–proteasome system (UPS), the proteasome maintains cardiac protein homeostasis and thus plays a significant role in cardiac ischemic injury, ventricular hypertrophy and heart failure. Additionally, evidence is accumulating that the UPS plays an essential role in malignant transformation. UPS proteolysis plays a major role in responses of cancer cells to stimulatory signals that are critical for the development of cancer. Accordingly, gene expression by degradation of transcription factors, such as p53, c-jun, c-Fos, NF-κB, c-Myc, HIF-1α, MATα2, STAT3, sterol-regulated element-binding proteins and androgen receptors are all controlled by the UPS and thus involved in the development of various malignancies. Moreover, the UPS regulates the degradation of tumor suppressor gene products such as adenomatous polyposis coli (APC) in colorectal cancer, retinoblastoma (Rb). and von Hippel–Lindau tumor suppressor (VHL), as well as a number of proto-oncogenes (Raf, Myc, Myb, Rel, Src, Mos, ABL). The UPS is also involved in the regulation of inflammatory responses. This activity is usually attributed to the role of proteasomes in the activation of NF-κB which further regulates the expression of pro inflammatory cytokines such as TNF-α, IL-β, IL-8, adhesion molecules (ICAM-1, VCAM-1, P-selectin) and prostaglandins and nitric oxide (NO). Additionally, the UPS also plays a role in inflammatory responses as regulators of leukocyte proliferation, mainly through proteolysis of cyclines and the degradation of CDK inhibitors. Lastly, autoimmune disease patients with SLE, Sjögren syndrome and rheumatoid arthritis (RA) predominantly exhibit circulating proteasomes which can be applied as clinical biomarkers.

The PSMB7 protein has a variety of clinically relevant constituents. For instance, in breast cancer cells, a high expression level of the PSMB7 protein suggests a shorter survival than in cells with a lower expression level. This interesting finding indicates that the PSMB7 protein may be used as a clinical prognostic biomarker in breast cancer. The same study also suggested that the PSMB7 protein is involved in anthracycline resistance, which is an antibiotic derived from streptomyces bacteria and used as an anticancer chemotherapy for leukemias, lymphomas, breast cancer, uterine, ovarian and lung cancers. Furthermore, the PSMB7 protein may also be involved in the resistance to 5-fluoro uracil (5-FU) therapy. Targeting the PSMB7 gene, to down-regulate PSMB7 protein, may overcome resistance to 5-FU and thus a possible new approach to treat hepatocellular carcinoma with this chemotherapeutic drug. High PSMB7 expression is an unfavourable prognostic marker in breast cancer. In this, survival of resistant breast cancer cell lines decreased after doxorubicin or paclitaxel treatment when PSMB7 was knocked down by RNA interference. These results were validated in 1592 microarray samples: patients with high PSMB7 expression had a significantly shorter survival than patients with low expression. Knockdown of the PSMB7 gene may also induce autophagy in cardiomyocytes.
