= PSMD9 =

Enzyme found in humans

Identifiers
- Aliases: PSMD9, Rpn4, p27, proteasome 26S subunit, non-ATPase 9
- External IDs: OMIM: 603146; MGI: 1914401; GeneCards: PSMD9

Gene location (Human)
Chr.	Chromosome 12 (human)
Band	12q24.31	Start	121,888,732 bp
Band	12q24.31	End	121,918,297 bp

Gene location (Mouse)
Chr.	Chromosome 5 (mouse)
Band	5|5 F	Start	123,307,476 bp
Band	5|5 F	End	123,388,194 bp
RNA expression pattern
Bgee	Human / Mouse (ortholog); Top expressed in: stromal cell of endometrium; monocyte; granulocyte; body of pancreas; mucosa of transverse colon; body of stomach; right adrenal gland; ascending aorta; left adrenal gland; left adrenal cortex / Top expressed in: superior surface of tongue; gallbladder; Ileal epithelium; Rostral migratory stream; right kidney; zygote; embryo; morula; left lobe of liver; spermatocyte; More reference expression data
BioGPS	n/a
Gene ontology
Molecular function	transcription coactivator activity; bHLH transcription factor binding; protein binding
Cellular component	cytoplasm; cytosol; proteasome regulatory particle, base subcomplex; proteasome regulatory particle; nucleoplasm; nucleus
Biological process	negative regulation of insulin secretion; ubiquitin-dependent protein catabolic process; positive regulation of transcription, DNA-templated; positive regulation of insulin secretion; protein deubiquitination; post-translational protein modification; proteasome regulatory particle assembly; MAPK cascade; protein polyubiquitination; stimulatory C-type lectin receptor signaling pathway; antigen processing and presentation of exogenous peptide antigen via MHC class I, TAP-dependent; regulation of cellular amino acid metabolic process; negative regulation of G2/M transition of mitotic cell cycle; anaphase-promoting complex-dependent catabolic process; SCF-dependent proteasomal ubiquitin-dependent protein catabolic process; tumor necrosis factor-mediated signaling pathway; NIK/NF-kappaB signaling; Fc-epsilon receptor signaling pathway; proteasome-mediated ubiquitin-dependent protein catabolic process; regulation of mRNA stability; T cell receptor signaling pathway; transmembrane transport; Wnt signaling pathway, planar cell polarity pathway; regulation of transcription from RNA polymerase II promoter in response to hypoxia; interleukin-1-mediated signaling pathway; negative regulation of canonical Wnt signaling pathway; positive regulation of canonical Wnt signaling pathway; regulation of mitotic cell cycle phase transition; regulation of hematopoietic stem cell differentiation
Sources:Amigo / QuickGO
Orthologs
Databases	NCBI: entry; OMA: entry
Species	Human	Mouse
Entrez	5715	67151
Ensembl	ENSG00000110801	ENSMUSG00000029440
UniProt	O00233	Q9CR00
RefSeq (mRNA)	NM_001261400; NM_002813	NM_026000
RefSeq (protein)	NP_001248329; NP_002804	NP_080276
Location (UCSC)	Chr 12: 121.89 – 121.92 Mb	Chr 5: 123.31 – 123.39 Mb
PubMed search
- Wikidata
View/Edit Human	View/Edit Mouse

26S proteasome non-ATPase regulatory subunit 9 is an enzyme that in humans is encoded by the PSMD9 gene.

== Function ==
The 26S proteasome is a multicatalytic proteinase complex with a highly ordered structure composed of 2 complexes, a 20S core and a 19S regulator. The 20S core is composed of 4 rings of 28 non-identical subunits; 2 rings are composed of 7 alpha subunits and 2 rings are composed of 7 beta subunits. The 19S regulator is composed of a base, which contains 6 ATPase subunits and 2 non-ATPase subunits, and a lid, which contains up to 10 non-ATPase subunits. Proteasomes are distributed throughout eukaryotic cells at a high concentration and cleave peptides in an ATP/ubiquitin-dependent process in a non-lysosomal pathway. An essential function of a modified proteasome, the immunoproteasome, is the processing of class I MHC peptides. This gene encodes a non-ATPase subunit of the 19S regulator.

== Clinical significance ==
The proteasome and its subunits are of clinical significance for at least two reasons: (1) a compromised complex assembly or a dysfunctional proteasome can be associated with the underlying pathophysiology of specific diseases, and (2) they can be exploited as drug targets for therapeutic interventions. More recently, more effort has been made to consider the proteasome for the development of novel diagnostic markers and strategies. An improved and comprehensive understanding of the pathophysiology of the proteasome should lead to clinical applications in the future.

The proteasomes form a pivotal component for the ubiquitin–proteasome system (UPS) and corresponding cellular Protein Quality Control (PQC). Protein ubiquitination and subsequent proteolysis and degradation by the proteasome are important mechanisms in the regulation of the cell cycle, cell growth and differentiation, gene transcription, signal transduction and apoptosis. Subsequently, a compromised proteasome complex assembly and function lead to reduced proteolytic activities and the accumulation of damaged or misfolded protein species. Such protein accumulation may contribute to the pathogenesis and phenotypic characteristics in neurodegenerative diseases, cardiovascular diseases, inflammatory responses and autoimmune diseases, and systemic DNA damage responses leading to malignancies.

Several experimental and clinical studies have indicated that aberrations and deregulations of the UPS contribute to the pathogenesis of several neurodegenerative and myodegenerative disorders, including Alzheimer's disease, Parkinson's disease and Pick's disease, Amyotrophic lateral sclerosis (ALS), Huntington's disease, Creutzfeldt–Jakob disease, and motor neuron diseases, polyglutamine (PolyQ) diseases, Muscular dystrophies and several rare forms of neurodegenerative diseases associated with dementia. As part of the ubiquitin–proteasome system (UPS), the proteasome maintains cardiac protein homeostasis and thus plays a significant role in cardiac Ischemic injury, ventricular hypertrophy and Heart failure. Additionally, evidence is accumulating that the UPS plays an essential role in malignant transformation. UPS proteolysis plays a major role in responses of cancer cells to stimulatory signals that are critical for the development of cancer. Accordingly, gene expression by degradation of transcription factors, such as p53, c-jun, c-Fos, NF-κB, c-Myc, HIF-1α, MATα2, STAT3, sterol-regulated element-binding proteins and androgen receptors are all controlled by the UPS and thus involved in the development of various malignancies. Moreover, the UPS regulates the degradation of tumor suppressor gene products such as adenomatous polyposis coli (APC) in colorectal cancer, retinoblastoma (Rb). and von Hippel–Lindau tumor suppressor (VHL), as well as a number of proto-oncogenes (Raf, Myc, Myb, Rel, Src, Mos, ABL). The UPS is also involved in the regulation of inflammatory responses. This activity is usually attributed to the role of proteasomes in the activation of NF-κB which further regulates the expression of pro inflammatory cytokines such as TNF-α, IL-β, IL-8, adhesion molecules (ICAM-1, VCAM-1, P-selectin) and prostaglandins and nitric oxide (NO). Additionally, the UPS also plays a role in inflammatory responses as regulators of leukocyte proliferation, mainly through proteolysis of cyclines and the degradation of CDK inhibitors. Lastly, autoimmune disease patients with SLE, Sjögren syndrome and rheumatoid arthritis (RA) predominantly exhibit circulating proteasomes which can be applied as clinical biomarkers.

Gene expression levels of the proteasomal subunits (PSMA1, PSMA5, PSMB4, PSMB5 and PSMD1) were investigated in 80 patients with neuroendocrine pulmonary tumors and compared to controls. The study reviled that PSMB4 mRNA was significantly associated with proliferative activity of neuroendocrine pulmonary tumors. However, a role of PSMA5 was also indicated in neuroendocrine pulmonary tumors. The PSMA5 protein has further been associated with the biosynthesis of conjugated linoleic acid (CLA) in mammary tissue.
