= PSMB8 =

Protein found in humans

Identifiers
- Aliases: PSMB8, ALDD, D6S216, D6S216E, JMP, LMP7, NKJO, PSMB5i, RING10, proteasome subunit beta 8, PRAAS1, proteasome 20S subunit beta 8
- External IDs: OMIM: 177046; MGI: 1346527; GeneCards: PSMB8
Enzyme activity
EC #	BRENDA	ExPASy	KEGG	MetaCyc
3.4.25.1	↗	↗	↗	↗

Gene location (Human)
Chr.	Chromosome 6 (human)
Band	6p21.32	Start	32,840,717 bp
Band	6p21.32	End	32,844,679 bp
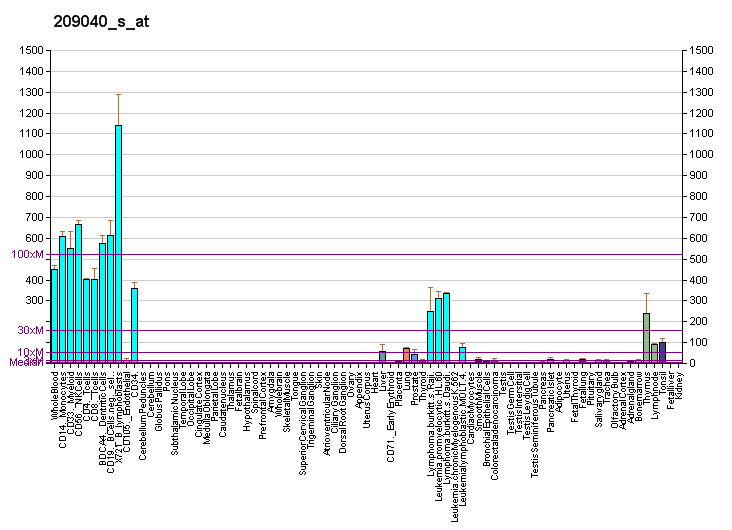
RNA expression pattern
Bgee	Human / Mouse (ortholog); Top expressed in: granulocyte; spleen; monocyte; lymph node; appendix; mucosa of transverse colon; duodenum; blood; rectum; olfactory zone of nasal mucosa / n/a; More reference expression data
BioGPS	More reference expression data
Gene ontology
Molecular function	endopeptidase activity; peptidase activity; protein binding; threonine-type endopeptidase activity; hydrolase activity
Cellular component	cytoplasm; cytosol; spermatoproteasome complex; nucleoplasm; proteasome complex; extracellular exosome; nucleus; proteasome core complex; proteasome core complex, beta-subunit complex
Biological process	cell differentiation; antigen processing and presentation; regulation of cellular amino acid metabolic process; antigen processing and presentation of exogenous peptide antigen via MHC class I, TAP-dependent; regulation of mRNA stability; immune system process; positive regulation of canonical Wnt signaling pathway; protein polyubiquitination; stimulatory C-type lectin receptor signaling pathway; tumor necrosis factor-mediated signaling pathway; MAPK cascade; proteolysis; Fc-epsilon receptor signaling pathway; NIK/NF-kappaB signaling; type I interferon signaling pathway; anaphase-promoting complex-dependent catabolic process; proteolysis involved in cellular protein catabolic process; T cell receptor signaling pathway; fat cell differentiation; negative regulation of canonical Wnt signaling pathway; regulation of endopeptidase activity; proteasome-mediated ubiquitin-dependent protein catabolic process; viral process; Wnt signaling pathway, planar cell polarity pathway; negative regulation of G2/M transition of mitotic cell cycle; protein deubiquitination; SCF-dependent proteasomal ubiquitin-dependent protein catabolic process; transmembrane transport; regulation of transcription from RNA polymerase II promoter in response to hypoxia; post-translational protein modification; regulation of hematopoietic stem cell differentiation; proteasomal protein catabolic process; proteasomal ubiquitin-independent protein catabolic process; interleukin-1-mediated signaling pathway; regulation of mitotic cell cycle phase transition
Sources:Amigo / QuickGO
Orthologs
Databases	NCBI: entry; OMA: entry
Species	Human	Mouse
Entrez	5696	16913
Ensembl	ENSG00000230669; ENSG00000206298; ENSG00000230034; ENSG00000235715; ENSG00000231631 ENSG00000204264; ENSG00000226201; ENSG00000236443	ENSMUSG00000024338
UniProt	P28062	P28063
RefSeq (mRNA)	NM_148919; NM_004159	NM_010724
RefSeq (protein)	NP_004150; NP_683720	NP_034854
Location (UCSC)	Chr 6: 32.84 – 32.84 Mb	n/a
PubMed search
- Wikidata
View/Edit Human	View/Edit Mouse

Proteasome subunit beta type-8 as known as 20S proteasome subunit beta-5i is a protein that in humans is encoded by the PSMB8 gene. This protein is one of the 17 essential subunits (alpha subunits 1–7, constitutive beta subunits 1–7, and inducible subunits including beta1i, beta2i, beta5i) that contributes to the complete assembly of 20S proteasome complex. In particular, proteasome subunit beta type-5, along with other beta subunits, assemble into two heptameric rings and subsequently a proteolytic chamber for substrate degradation. This protein contains "Chymotrypsin-like" activity and is capable of cleaving after large hydrophobic residues of peptide. The eukaryotic proteasome recognized degradable proteins, including damaged proteins for protein quality control purpose or key regulatory protein components for dynamic biological processes. The constitutive subunit beta1, beta2, and beta 5 (systematic nomenclature) can be replaced by their inducible counterparts beta1i, 2i, and 5i when cells are under the treatment of interferon-γ. The resulting proteasome complex becomes the so-called immunoproteasome. An essential function of the modified proteasome complex, the immunoproteasome, is the processing of numerous MHC class-I restricted T cell epitopes.

== Structure ==
=== Gene ===
This gene encodes a member of the proteasome B-type family, also known as the T1B family, that is a 20S core beta subunit. This gene is located in the class II region of the MHC (major histocompatibility complex). Expression of this gene is induced by gamma interferon and this gene product replaces catalytic subunit 3 (proteasome beta 5 subunit) in the immunoproteasome. Proteolytic processing is required to generate a mature subunit. Two alternative transcripts encoding two isoforms have been identified; both isoforms are processed to yield the same mature subunit. The human PSMB8 gene has 7 exons and locates at chromosome band 6p21.3.

=== Protein structure ===
The human protein proteasome subunit beta type-8 is 23 kDa in size and composed of 204 amino acids. The calculated theoretical pI of this protein is 7.59.

=== Complex assembly ===
The proteasome is a multicatalytic proteinase complex with a highly ordered 20S core structure. This barrel-shaped core structure is composed of 4 axially stacked rings of 28 non-identical subunits: the two end rings are each formed by 7 alpha subunits, and the two central rings are each formed by 7 beta subunits. Three beta subunits (beta1, beta2, beta5) each contains a proteolytic active site and has distinct substrate preferences. Proteasomes are distributed throughout eukaryotic cells at a high concentration and cleave peptides in an ATP/ubiquitin-dependent process in a non-lysosomal pathway.

== Function ==
Protein functions are supported by its tertiary structure and its interaction with associating partners. As one of 28 subunits of 20S proteasome, protein proteasome subunit beta type-2 contributes to form a proteolytic environment for substrate degradation. Evidences of the crystal structures of isolated 20S proteasome complex demonstrate that the two rings of beta subunits form a proteolytic chamber and maintain all their active sites of proteolysis within the chamber. Concomitantly, the rings of alpha subunits form the entrance for substrates entering the proteolytic chamber. In an inactivated 20S proteasome complex, the gate into the internal proteolytic chamber are guarded by the N-terminal tails of specific alpha-subunit. This unique structure design prevents random encounter between proteolytic active sites and protein substrate, which makes protein degradation a well-regulated process. 20S proteasome complex, by itself, is usually functionally inactive. The proteolytic capacity of 20S core particle (CP) can be activated when CP associates with one or two regulatory particles (RP) on one or both side of alpha rings. These regulatory particles include 19S proteasome complexes, 11S proteasome complex, etc. Following the CP-RP association, the confirmation of certain alpha subunits will change and consequently cause the opening of substrate entrance gate. Besides RPs, the 20S proteasomes can also be effectively activated by other mild chemical treatments, such as exposure to low levels of sodium dodecylsulfate (SDS) or NP-14.

The 20S proteasome subunit beta-5i (systematic nomenclature) is originally expressed as a precursor with 276 amino acids. The fragment of 72 amino acids at peptide N-terminal is essential for proper protein folding and subsequent complex assembly. At the end-stage of complex assembly, the N-terminal fragment of beta5i subunit is cleaved, forming the mature beta5i subunit of 20S complex. During the basal assembly, and proteolytic processing is required to generate a mature subunit. The subunit beta5i only presents in the immunoproteasome and is replaced by subunit beta5(proteasome beta 5 subunit) in constitutive 20S proteasome complex.

== Clinical significance ==
The proteasome and its subunits are of clinical significance for at least two reasons: (1) a compromised complex assembly or a dysfunctional proteasome can be associated with the underlying pathophysiology of specific diseases, and (2) they can be exploited as drug targets for therapeutic interventions. More recently, more effort has been made to consider the proteasome for the development of novel diagnostic markers and strategies. An improved and comprehensive understanding of the pathophysiology of the proteasome should lead to clinical applications in the future.

The proteasomes form a pivotal component for the ubiquitin–proteasome system (UPS) and corresponding cellular Protein Quality Control (PQC). Protein ubiquitination and subsequent proteolysis and degradation by the proteasome are important mechanisms in the regulation of the cell cycle, cell growth and differentiation, gene transcription, signal transduction and apoptosis. Subsequently, a compromised proteasome complex assembly and function lead to reduced proteolytic activities and the accumulation of damaged or misfolded protein species. Such protein accumulation may contribute to the pathogenesis and phenotypic characteristics in neurodegenerative diseases, cardiovascular diseases, inflammatory responses and autoimmune diseases, and systemic DNA damage responses leading to malignancies.

Several experimental and clinical studies have indicated that aberrations and deregulations of the UPS contribute to the pathogenesis of several neurodegenerative and myodegenerative disorders, including Alzheimer's disease, Parkinson's disease and Pick's disease, Amyotrophic lateral sclerosis (ALS), Huntington's disease, Creutzfeldt–Jakob disease, and motor neuron diseases, polyglutamine (PolyQ) diseases, Muscular dystrophies and several rare forms of neurodegenerative diseases associated with dementia. As part of the ubiquitin–proteasome system (UPS), the proteasome maintains cardiac protein homeostasis and thus plays a significant role in cardiac ischemic injury, ventricular hypertrophy and heart failure. Additionally, evidence is accumulating that the UPS plays an essential role in malignant transformation. UPS proteolysis plays a major role in responses of cancer cells to stimulatory signals that are critical for the development of cancer. Accordingly, gene expression by degradation of transcription factors, such as p53, c-jun, c-Fos, NF-κB, c-Myc, HIF-1α, MATα2, STAT3, sterol-regulated element-binding proteins and androgen receptors are all controlled by the UPS and thus involved in the development of various malignancies. Moreover, the UPS regulates the degradation of tumor suppressor gene products such as adenomatous polyposis coli (APC) in colorectal cancer, retinoblastoma (Rb). and von Hippel–Lindau tumor suppressor (VHL), as well as a number of proto-oncogenes (Raf, Myc, Myb, Rel, Src, Mos, ABL). The UPS is also involved in the regulation of inflammatory responses. This activity is usually attributed to the role of proteasomes in the activation of NF-κB which further regulates the expression of pro inflammatory cytokines such as TNF-α, IL-β, IL-8, adhesion molecules (ICAM-1, VCAM-1, P-selectin) and prostaglandins and nitric oxide (NO). Additionally, the UPS also plays a role in inflammatory responses as regulators of leukocyte proliferation, mainly through proteolysis of cyclines and the degradation of CDK inhibitors. Lastly, autoimmune disease patients with SLE, Sjögren syndrome and rheumatoid arthritis (RA) predominantly exhibit circulating proteasomes which can be applied as clinical biomarkers.

During the antigen processing for the major histocompatibility complex (MHC) class-I, the proteasome is the major degradation machinery that degrades the antigen and present the resulting peptides to cytotoxic T lymphocytes. The immunoproteasome has been considered playing a critical role in improving the quality and quantity of generated class-I ligands.

The PSMB8 protein has a significant clinical role in autoimmune diseases and inflammatory reactions. For instance, patients with a homozygous missense mutation (G197V) in the immunoproteasome subunit, β type 8 (PSMB8) suffered from autoinflammatory responses that included recurrent fever and nodular erythema together with lipodystrophy. This mutation increased assembly intermediates of immunoproteasomes, resulting in decreased proteasome function and ubiquitin-coupled protein accumulation in the patient's tissues. In the patient's skin and B cells, IL-6 was also highly expressed, and there was a reduced expression of PSMB8. Furthermore, downregulation of PSMB8 also inhibited the differentiation of murine and human adipocytes in vitro, while an injection of siRNA against Psmb8 in mouse skin could reduce adipocyte tissue volume. Thus, PSMB8 may be an essential component and regulator not only for inflammation, but also in the differentiation of adipocytes, hereby indicating that immunoproteasomes may have pleiotropic functions to maintain the homeostasis of a variety of cell types. Subsequently, in addition to autoimmune diseases the PSMB8 protein also has been linked in the diagnosis of lipodystrophy syndrome. Glycosylation disorders are sometimes involved. Some genetically determined forms have recently been found to be due to autoinflammatory syndromes linked to a proteasome anomaly through PSMB8. They result in a lipodystrophy syndrome that occurs secondarily with fever, dermatosis and panniculitis, and Nakajo-Nishimura syndrome, a distinct inherited inflammatory and wasting disease that is originated from Japan. Patients with Nakajo-Nishimura syndrome, develop periodic high fever and nodular erythema-like eruptions, and gradually progress lipomuscular atrophy in the upper body, mainly the face and the upper extremities, to show the characteristic thin facial appearance and long clubbed fingers with joint contractures.
