= C5H7N3O4 =

The molecular formula C_{5}H_{7}N_{3}O_{4} (molar mass: 173.12 g/mol) may refer to:

- Azaserine
- Ammonium orotate
