= Immunoproteasome =

An immunoproteasome is a type of proteasome that degrades ubiquitin-labeled proteins found in the cytoplasm in cells exposed to oxidative stress and proinflammatory stimuli. In general, proteasomes consist of a regulatory and a catalytic part. Immunoproteasomes are induced by interferon gamma (but also by other proinflammatory cytokines) and oxidative stress, which in the cell triggers the transcription of three catalytic subunits that do not occur in the classical proteasome. Another possible variation of proteasome is the thymoproteasome, which is located in the thymus and folds to present peptides to naive T cells.

== Structure ==
Structurally, immunoproteasome is a cylindrical protein complex composed of a catalytic 20S subunit and a 19S regulatory subunit. The catalytic subunit consists of four outer alpha rings and four inner beta rings. In the classical proteasome, the beta (β) 1, β2 and β5 subunits have catalytic activity, which, however, in the immunoproteasome are replaced by the subunits LMP2 (alias β1i), MECL-1 (alias β2i), and LMP7 (alias β5i). The LMP2 protein is composed of 20 amino acids, MECL-1 of 39 amino acids and LMP7 occurs in isoform and therefore can have either 72 or 68 amino acids. The regulatory unit consists of 19 proteins, which are structurally divided into a lid of 9 proteins and a base again of 9 proteins. The RPN10 protein is added to this regulatory complex, which serves to stabilize the structure and as a receptor for ubiquitin.

== Function ==
The function of the immunoproteasome is primarily to specifically cleave proteins into shorter peptides, which can then be displayed on the cell surface together with the MHC I complex. The MHC I complex with bound peptide is then recognized primarily by cytotoxic T cells. In order to expose a peptide on the cell surface, the ubiquitin-labeled protein, specifically cleaved into peptides by immunoproteasome, must first be transferred to the endoplasmic reticulum using TAP1 and TAP2 transporters and chaperones. In the endoplasmic reticulum, the peptide is then bound to an MHC I molecule.

The aforementioned LMP2 and LMP7 subunits are encoded by the PSMB9 (LMP2) and PSMB8 (LMP7) genes, which are found in the MHC II gene cluster of the TAP-1 and TAP-2 genes. The LMP2 subunit has the function of chymotrypsin, which means that it cleaves bonds after hydrophobic substances and this prepares peptides with hydrophobic C anchors for the MHC I complex. While LMP7 and MECL-1 subunits form the same as the standard proteasome subunits, i.e. trypsin and chymotrypsin activity

== Diseases associated with immunoproteasome ==
The ability to display peptides on the cell surface is essential for the recognition of cell status by immune cells. Its proper function is therefore essential and when it is disrupted, a disease occurs. Some examples where the effect of immunoproteasome on pathology has been confirmed are given below:

Mutations in the PSMB8 gene, which encodes the LMP7 subunit, are involved in a variety of diseases and autoinflammatory disorders, the symptoms of which include skin rash, erythema, spiking fever and lipodystrophy, which are presented since early childhood. These also include Nakajo-Nishimura syndrome, a Japanese autoinflammatory syndrom with lipodystrophy syndrome (JASL) or chronic atypical neutrophilic dermatosis with lipodystrophy and elevated temperature. This list of syndromes is collectively called proteasome-associated autoinflammatory syndrome.

In Alzheimer's disease, a single nucleotide polymorphisms have been found in the immunoproteasome subunit, which increases the chance of its occurrence. Alzheimer's disease is characterized by the presence of amyloid plaques in which an advanced glycation end product occurs. These advanced glycation end-products are not degraded in the cell and remain in it. It is in amyloid plaques that the active activity of the immunoproteasome is found as a consequence of the cells' efforts to remove plaques.
