= Streptomyces fragilis =

Scientific classification
- Domain: Bacteria
- Kingdom: Bacillati
- Phylum: Actinomycetota
- Class: Actinomycetes
- Order: Streptomycetales
- Family: Streptomycetaceae
- Genus: Streptomyces
- Species: S. fragilis

Binomial name
- Streptomyces fragilis Anderson et al. 1956

Type strain
- AndersonC1437, ATCC 23908, BCRC 13654, C 1437, CBS 804.68, CCRC 13654, CGMCC 4.1955, DSM 40044, ETH 31506, HAMBI 1083, HAMBI 1090, IFO 12862, IMET 43575, IMRU 3732, ISP 5044, JCM 4187, JCM 4638, KCC S-0187, KCC S-0638, KCCS-0187, KCCS-0638, NBRC 12862, NCIMB 9795, NIHJ 415, NRRL B-2424, NRRL 2424, NRRL B-2424, NRRL-ISP 5044, P-D 04926, Parke, Davis & Co.PD04926, RIA 1111, VKM Ac-1773

Species of bacterium

Streptomyces fragilis is a bacterium species from the genus of Streptomyces which has been isolated from soil in Argentina. Streptomyces fragilis produces the antibiotic azaserine.

== See also ==
- List of Streptomyces species
