= Azaserine =

Chemical compound

Clinical data
- ATC code: none

Identifiers
- IUPAC name: O-(2-Diazoacetyl)-L-serine
- CAS Number: 115-02-6
- PubChem CID: 5284344
- ChemSpider: 16735688
- UNII: 87299V3Q9W
- KEGG: D03032
- ChEBI: CHEBI:74846
- ChEMBL: ChEMBL1095699
- CompTox Dashboard (EPA): DTXSID9020118
- ECHA InfoCard: 100.003.692

Chemical and physical data
- Formula: C_{5}H_{7}N_{3}O_{4}
- Molar mass: 173.128 g·mol^{−1}
- 3D model (JSmol): Interactive image
- SMILES: O=C(OC[C@H](N)C(O)=O)/C=[N+]=[N-]
- InChI: InChI=1S/C5H7N3O4/c6-3(5(10)11)2-12-4(9)1-8-7/h1,3H,2,6H2,(H,10,11)/t3-/m0/s1; Key:MZZGOOYMKKIOOX-VKHMYHEASA-N

Azaserine is a naturally occurring toxic serine derivative diazo compound with antineoplastic and antibiotic properties deriving from its action as a purinergic antagonist and structural similarity to glutamine. Azaserine acts by competitively inhibiting glutamine amidotransferase, a key enzyme responsible for glutamine metabolism.

== Mechanism of Action ==
Azaserine inhibits the rate limiting step of the metabolic hexosamine pathway and irreversibly inhibits γ-glutamyltransferase by acting directly at the substrate-binding pocket. Independent of hexosamine pathway inhibition, azaserine has been demonstrated to protect against hyperglycemic endothelial damage by elevating serum concentrations of manganese-superoxide dismutase, directly reducing the concentration of reactive oxygen species.

Azaserine also downregulates the expression of VCAM-1 and ICAM-1 in response to TNF-α, and research indicates that it may have potential in identifying the L-leucine-favoring system transporter in human T-lymphocytes.

== Properties ==
Azaserine has a solubility of 50 mg/mL in water, a melting point of 146-162 °C, a vapor pressure of 1.53×10^{−10}mmHg at 25 °C, and decomposes before melting.
