= Ammonium orotate =

Names
- IUPAC name azanium 2,4-dioxo-1H-pyrimidine-6-carboxylate

Identifiers
| CAS Number | (monohydrate) 34932-23-5 (monohydrate) |
| 3D model (JSmol) | Interactive image |
| PubChem CID | 44621156 |
- InChI: InChI=1S/C5H4N2O4.H3N/c8-3-1-2(4(9)10)6-5(11)7-3;/h1H,(H,9,10)(H2,6,7,8,11);1H3 Key: BLRHHOPYXJENCY-UHFFFAOYSA-N
- SMILES: C1=C(NC(=O)NC1=O)C(=O)[O-].[NH4+]

Properties
| Chemical formula | C_{5}H_{7}N_{3}O_{4} |
| Molar mass | 173.128 g·mol^{−1} |
| Appearance | white powder |
| Solubility in water | soluble |
- Except where otherwise noted, data are given for materials in their standard state (at 25 °C [77 °F], 100 kPa). Infobox references

Ammonium orotate is a chemical compound with the chemical formula C_{5}H_{7}N_{3}O_{4}.This is an organic ammonium salt of orotic acid (vitamin B_{13}).

== Properties ==
The compound is a white, crystalline powder, soluble in water, used in biochemical research and historically considered as a potential nutritional supplement, though its clinical significance is primarily diagnostic. As a metabolite, orotic acid (the anion of which is orotate) is an intermediate in the pyrimidine biosynthesis pathway.

== Structure ==
It exists as a 3D hydrogen-bonded supramolecular structure, often synthesized as ammonium orotate monohydrate.
