= MYB (gene) =

Protein-coding gene in humans

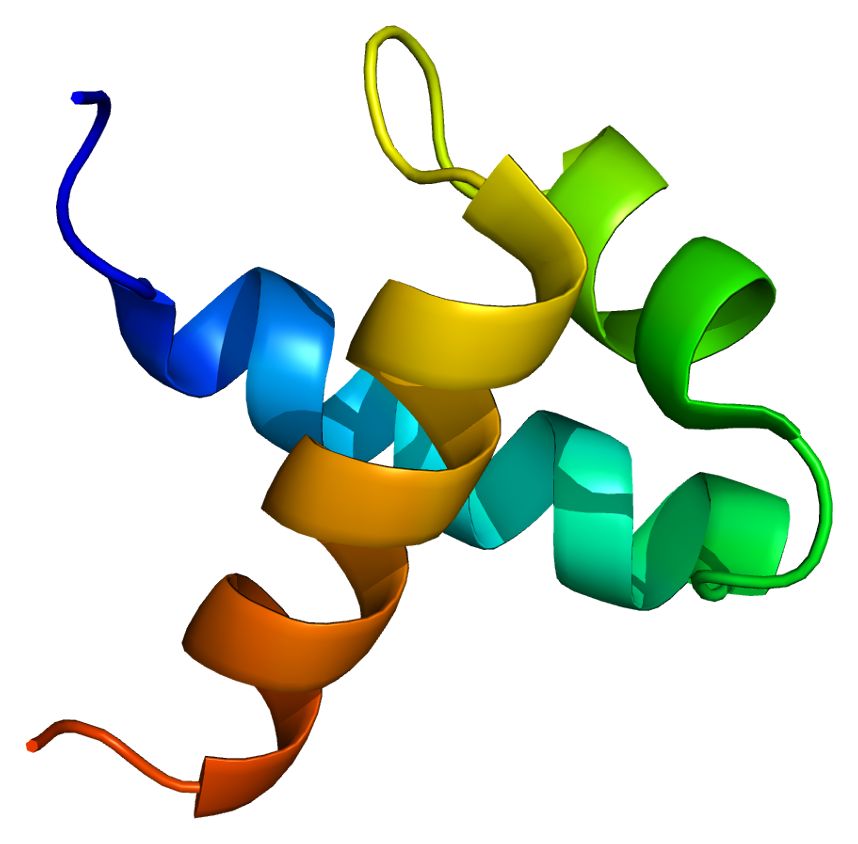

Identifiers
- Aliases: MYB, Cmyb, c-myb, c-myb_CDS, efg, MYB proto-oncogene, transcription factor
- External IDs: OMIM: 189990; MGI: 97249; GeneCards: MYB
Available structures
PDB	Ortholog search: PDBe RCSB
PDB	List of PDB id codes 1GUU, 1GV2, 1GV5, 1GVD, 1H88, 1H89, 1IDY, 1IDZ, 1MBE, 1MBF, 1MBG, 1MBH, 1MBJ, 1MBK, 1MSE, 1MSF, 1SB0, 2AGH

Gene location (Human)
Chr.	Chromosome 6 (human)
Band	6q23.3	Start	135,181,308 bp
Band	6q23.3	End	135,219,173 bp

Gene location (Mouse)
Chr.	Chromosome 10 (mouse)
Band	10 A3|10 9.75 cM	Start	21,000,834 bp
Band	10 A3|10 9.75 cM	End	21,036,883 bp
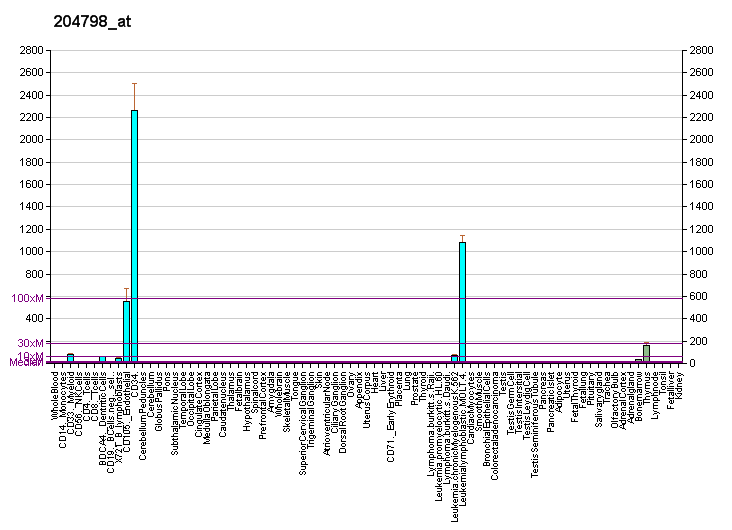
RNA expression pattern
Bgee	Human / Mouse (ortholog); Top expressed in: mucosa of sigmoid colon; bronchial epithelial cell; trabecular bone; bone marrow; thymus; rectum; buccal mucosa cell; bone marrow cell; mucosa of transverse colon; right uterine tube / Top expressed in: thymus; tibiofemoral joint; left colon; fetal liver hematopoietic progenitor cell; crypt of lieberkuhn of small intestine; Paneth cell; hair follicle; femur; body of femur; granulocyte; More reference expression data
BioGPS	More reference expression data
Gene ontology
Molecular function	RNA polymerase II cis-regulatory region sequence-specific DNA binding; DNA binding; DNA-binding transcription activator activity, RNA polymerase II-specific; protein binding; DNA-binding transcription factor activity, RNA polymerase II-specific
Cellular component	nuclear matrix; nucleus; nucleoplasm
Biological process	positive regulation of transcription, DNA-templated; chromatin remodeling; negative regulation of transcription, DNA-templated; regulation of transcription, DNA-templated; negative regulation of transcription by RNA polymerase II; positive regulation of histone H3-K4 methylation; transcription, DNA-templated; positive regulation of transcription by RNA polymerase II; positive regulation of histone H3-K9 methylation; positive regulation of T-helper cell differentiation; transcription by RNA polymerase II; mitotic cell cycle; response to hypoxia; positive regulation of collagen biosynthetic process; positive regulation of neuron apoptotic process; positive regulation of smooth muscle cell proliferation; positive regulation of glial cell proliferation; cellular response to hydrogen peroxide; cellular response to retinoic acid; positive regulation of transforming growth factor beta production; positive regulation of neuron death; positive regulation of hepatic stellate cell proliferation; positive regulation of hepatic stellate cell activation; positive regulation of testosterone secretion; regulation of hematopoietic stem cell differentiation
Sources:Amigo / QuickGO
Orthologs
Databases	NCBI: entry; OMA: entry
Species	Human	Mouse
Entrez	4602	17863
Ensembl	ENSG00000118513	ENSMUSG00000019982
UniProt	P10242; Q708E1	P06876
RefSeq (mRNA)	NM_001130172; NM_001130173; NM_001161656; NM_001161657; NM_001161658 NM_001161659; NM_001161660; NM_005375	NM_001198914; NM_010848; NM_033597
RefSeq (protein)	NP_001123644; NP_001123645; NP_001155128; NP_001155129; NP_001155130 NP_001155131; NP_001155132; NP_005366	NP_001185843; NP_034978
Location (UCSC)	Chr 6: 135.18 – 135.22 Mb	Chr 10: 21 – 21.04 Mb
PubMed search
- Wikidata
View/Edit Human	View/Edit Mouse

MYB Proto-Oncogene, Transcription Factor is a protein that in humans is encoded by the gene MYB. This protein is a member of the MYB (myeloblastosis) family of transcription factors (§ MYB protein family). The protein contains three domains, an N-terminal DNA-binding domain, a central transcriptional activation domain and a C-terminal domain involved in transcriptional repression. It may play a role in cell cycle regulation. Like the viral version, this gene is an oncogene, and rearrangements of the gene (often involving deletion in the C-terminal domain) causes cancer.

== MYB protein family ==
Myb-like DNA-binding domain

Identifiers
- Symbol: Myb_DNA-binding
- Pfam: PF00249
- InterPro: IPR001005
- PROSITE: PDOC00037
- CATH: 1irz
- SCOP2: 1irz / SCOPe / SUPFAM
- CDD: cd00167
Available protein structures:
- PDB: IPR001005 PF00249 (ECOD; PDBsum)
- AlphaFold: IPR001005; PF00249

Myb genes are part of a large gene family of transcription factors found in animals, plants, and fungi. In humans, it includes Myb proto-oncogene like 1 and Myb-related protein B in addition to MYB proper. Members of the extended SANT/Myb family also include the SANT domain and other similar all-helical homeobox-like domains.

=== Viral ===
The Myb gene family is named after the eponymous gene in Avian myeloblastosis virus. The viral Myb (v-Myb, P01104) recognizes the sequence 5'-YAACKG-3'. It causes myeloblastosis (myeloid leukemia) in chickens. Compared to the normal animal cellular Myb (c-myb), v-myb contains deletions in the C-terminal regulatory domain, leading to aberrant activation of other oncogenes.

=== Plants ===
MYB factors represent a family of proteins that include the conserved MYB DNA-binding domain. Plants contain a MYB-protein subfamily that is characterised by the R2R3-type MYB domain.

In maize, phlobaphenes are synthesized in the flavonoids synthetic pathway from polymerisation of flavan-4-ols which encodes an R2R3 myb-like transcriptional activator of the A1 gene encoding for the dihydroflavonol 4-reductase (reducing dihydroflavonols into flavan-4-ols) while another gene (Suppressor of Pericarp Pigmentation 1 or SPP1) acts as a suppressor. The maize P gene encodes a Myb homolog that recognizes the sequence CCWACC, in sharp contrast with the YAACGG bound by vertebrate Myb proteins.

In sorghum, the corresponding yellow seed 1 gene (y1) also encodes a R2R3 type of Myb domain protein that regulates the expression of chalcone synthase, chalcone isomerase and dihydroflavonol reductase genes required for the biosynthesis of 3-deoxyflavonoids.

Ruby is a MYB transcriptional activator of genes that produce anthocyanin in citrus fruits. In most citrus varieties Ruby is non-functional, but in blood oranges it upregulates anthocyanin production to produce the characteristic red color of the fruit.

== See also ==
- EZH1
