= RAF kinase =

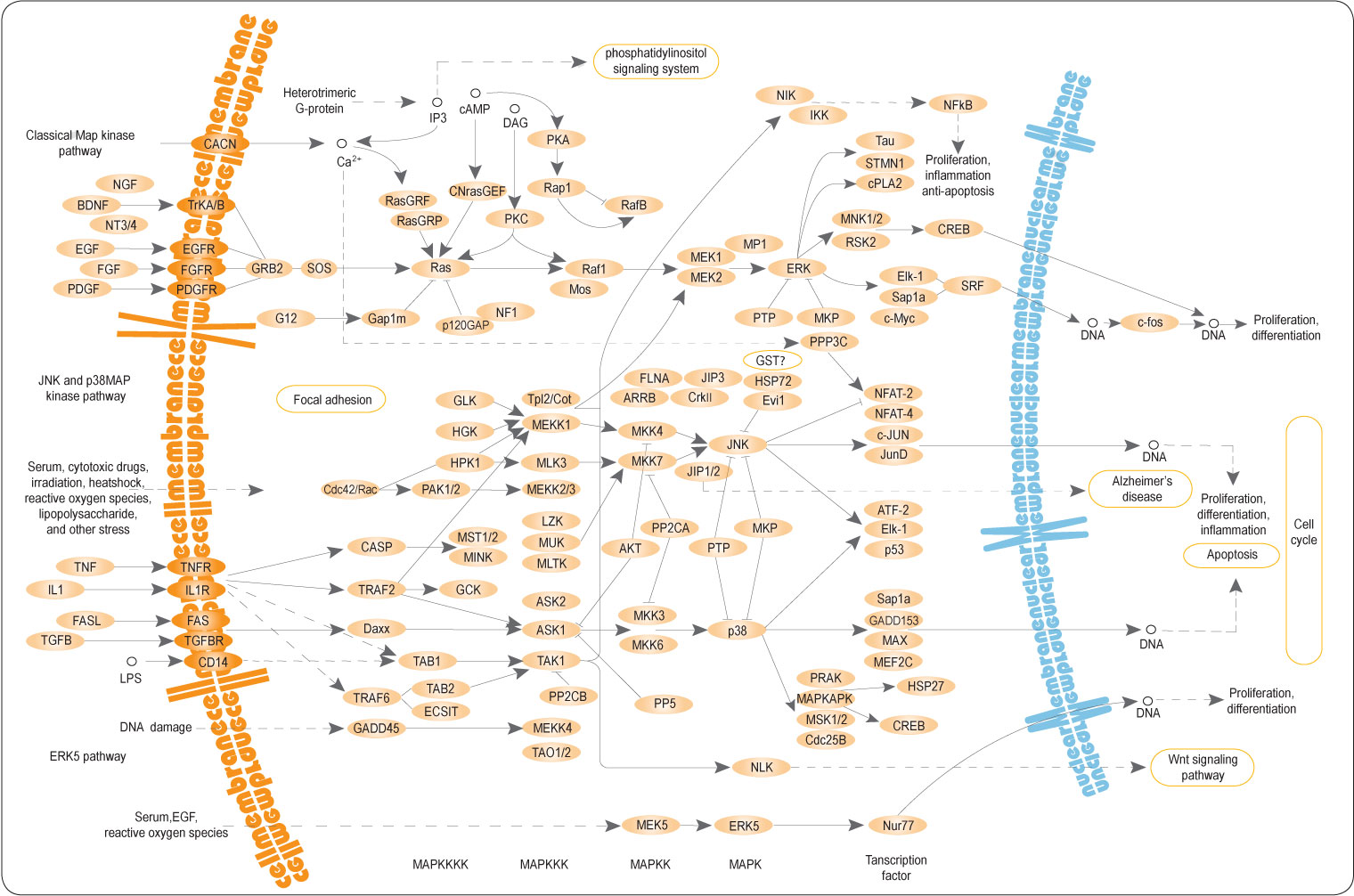
The mitogen-activated protein kinase (MAPK) pathway. RAF-1 is between RAS and MEK just above the centre of the diagram.

RAF kinases are a family of three serine/threonine-specific protein kinases that are related to retroviral oncogenes. The mouse sarcoma virus 3611, a Gammaretrovirus, contains an RAF kinase-related oncogene that enhances fibrosarcoma induction. RAF is an acronym for Rapidly Accelerated Fibrosarcoma.

RAF kinases participate in the RAS-RAF-MEK-ERK signal transduction cascade, also referred to as the mitogen-activated protein kinase (MAPK) cascade. Activation of RAF kinases requires interaction with Ras GTPases.

The three RAF kinase family members are:

- A-RAF
- B-RAF
- c-Raf
