= VCAM-1 =

Protein found in humans

VCAM1
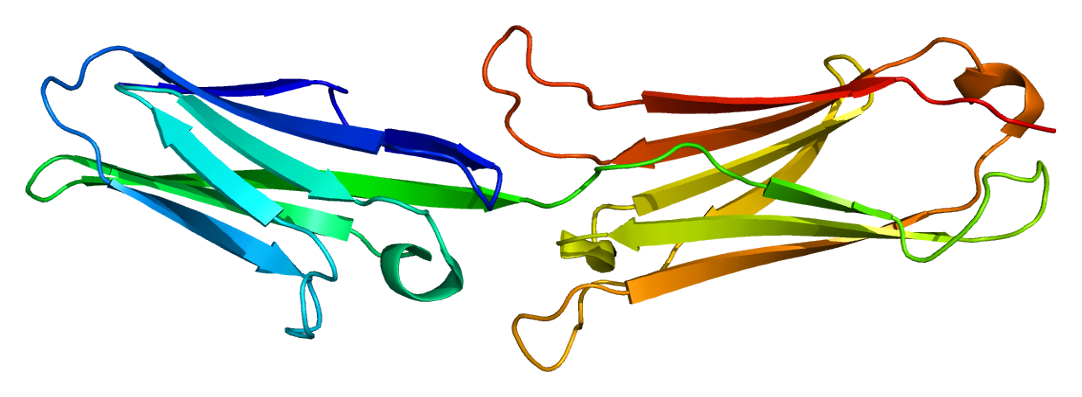

Identifiers
- Aliases: VCAM1, CD106, INCAM-100, vascular cell adhesion molecule 1
- External IDs: OMIM: 192225; MGI: 98926; GeneCards: VCAM1
Available structures
PDB	Ortholog search: PDBe RCSB
PDB	List of PDB id codes 1IJ9, 1VCA, 1VSC

Gene location (Human)
Chr.	Chromosome 1 (human)
Band	1p21.2	Start	100,719,742 bp
Band	1p21.2	End	100,739,045 bp

Gene location (Mouse)
Chr.	Chromosome 3 (mouse)
Band	3 G1|3 50.17 cM	Start	115,903,598 bp
Band	3 G1|3 50.17 cM	End	115,923,337 bp
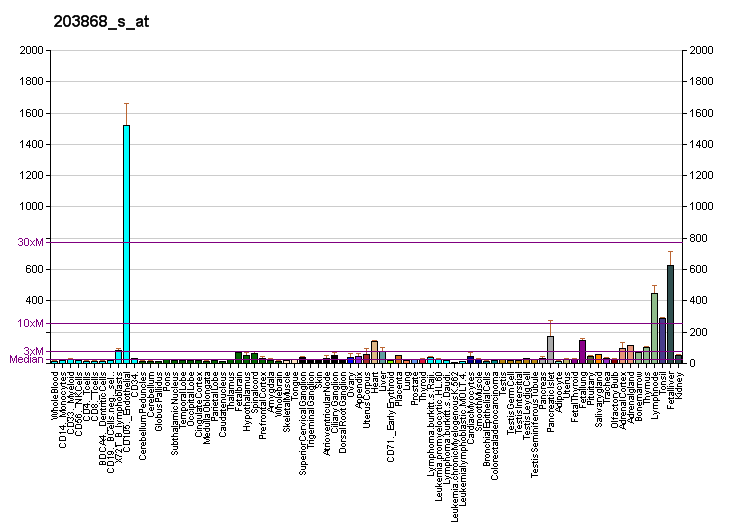
RNA expression pattern
Bgee	Human / Mouse (ortholog); Top expressed in: cartilage tissue; trabecular bone; parietal pleura; tendon of biceps brachii; vena cava; spleen; glomerulus; metanephric glomerulus; synovial joint; kidney tubule / Top expressed in: stroma of bone marrow; spleen; dermis; Epithelium of choroid plexus; tibiofemoral joint; choroid plexus of fourth ventricle; left lung lobe; atrium; human fetus; thymus; More reference expression data
BioGPS	More reference expression data
Gene ontology
Molecular function	primary amine oxidase activity; integrin binding; cell adhesion molecule binding
Cellular component	integral component of membrane; Golgi apparatus; alpha9-beta1 integrin-vascular cell adhesion molecule-1 complex; membrane; filopodium; plasma membrane; apical part of cell; microvillus; cell surface; early endosome; endoplasmic reticulum; podosome; sarcolemma; extracellular exosome; external side of plasma membrane; extracellular space; integral component of plasma membrane
Biological process	leukocyte cell-cell adhesion; response to ionizing radiation; heterophilic cell-cell adhesion via plasma membrane cell adhesion molecules; response to hypoxia; response to nutrient; interferon-gamma-mediated signaling pathway; cellular response to tumor necrosis factor; response to nicotine; ageing; response to zinc ion; extracellular matrix organization; amine metabolic process; response to lipopolysaccharide; cell adhesion; acute inflammatory response; positive regulation of T cell proliferation; membrane to membrane docking; regulation of immune response; leukocyte tethering or rolling; cell chemotaxis; B cell differentiation; cellular response to vascular endothelial growth factor stimulus; cell-matrix adhesion; viral process; response to ethanol; calcium-mediated signaling using intracellular calcium source; chronic inflammatory response; cell-cell adhesion; cytokine-mediated signaling pathway; heterotypic cell-cell adhesion; innervation; cardiac neuron differentiation; cell-cell adhesion in response to extracellular stimulus; cellular response to amyloid-beta
Sources:Amigo / QuickGO
Orthologs
Databases	NCBI: entry; OMA: entry
Species	Human	Mouse
Entrez	7412	22329
Ensembl	ENSG00000162692	ENSMUSG00000027962
UniProt	P19320	P29533
RefSeq (mRNA)	NM_080682; NM_001078; NM_001199834	NM_011693
RefSeq (protein)	NP_001069; NP_001186763; NP_542413	NP_035823
Location (UCSC)	Chr 1: 100.72 – 100.74 Mb	Chr 3: 115.9 – 115.92 Mb
PubMed search
- Wikidata
View/Edit Human	View/Edit Mouse

Vascular cell adhesion protein 1 also known as vascular cell adhesion molecule 1 (VCAM-1) or cluster of differentiation 106 (CD106) is a protein that in humans is encoded by the VCAM1 gene. VCAM-1 functions as a cell adhesion molecule.

== Structure ==
VCAM-1 is a member of the immunoglobulin superfamily, the superfamily of proteins including antibodies and T-cell receptors. The VCAM-1 gene contains six or seven immunoglobulin domains, and is expressed on both large and small blood vessels only after the endothelial cells are stimulated by cytokines. It is alternatively spliced into two known RNA transcripts that encode different isoforms in humans. The gene product is a cell surface sialoglycoprotein, a type I membrane protein that is a member of the Ig superfamily.

== Function ==
The VCAM-1 protein mediates the adhesion of lymphocytes, monocytes, eosinophils, and basophils to vascular endothelium. It also functions in leukocyte-endothelial cell signal transduction, and it may play a role in the development of atherosclerosis and rheumatoid arthritis.

Upregulation of VCAM-1 in endothelial cells by cytokines occurs as a result of increased gene transcription (e.g., in response to tumor necrosis factor-alpha (TNF-α) and interleukin-1 (IL-1)) and through stabilization of messenger RNA (mRNA) (e.g., Interleukin-4 (IL-4)). The promoter region of the VCAM1 gene contains functional tandem NF-κB (nuclear factor-kappa B) sites. The sustained expression of VCAM-1 lasts over 24 hours.

Primarily, the VCAM-1 protein is an endothelial ligand for VLA-4 (Very Late Antigen-4 or integrin α4β1) of the β1 subfamily of integrins. VCAM-1 expression has also been observed in other cell types (e.g., smooth muscle cells). It has also been shown to interact with EZR and Moesin.

VCAM-1 is also upregulated if vWF (Von Willebrand Factor) is given in knock-out (KO) ADMATS13 mice but not on mice without KO.

CD106 also exists on the surface of some subpopulations of mesenchymal stem cells (MSC).

== Pharmacology ==
Certain melanoma cells can use VCAM-1 to adhere to the endothelium, VCAM-1 may participate in monocyte recruitment to atherosclerotic sites, and it is highly overexpressed in the inflamed brain. As a result, VCAM-1 is a potential drug target.
