= PSMA =

PSMA may refer to:

- Port State Measures Agreement, an international treaty
- Prostate-specific membrane antigen, a human enzyme

== See also ==
- Proteasome endopeptidase complex subunits:
  - PSMA1
  - PSMA2
  - PSMA3
  - PSMA4
  - PSMA5
  - PSMA6
  - PSMA7
  - PSMA8
