= C7orf25 =

Human protein-coding gene

Identifiers
- Aliases: C7orf25, C7orf25 protein UPF0415, chromosome 7 open reading frame 25
- External IDs: MGI: 2145422; GeneCards: C7orf25

Gene location (Human)
Chr.	Chromosome 7 (human)
Band	7p14.1	Start	42,909,273 bp
Band	7p14.1	End	42,912,305 bp

Gene location (Mouse)
Chr.	Chromosome 13 (mouse)
Band	13|13 A1	Start	14,804,739 bp
Band	13|13 A1	End	14,813,681 bp
RNA expression pattern
Bgee	Human / Mouse (ortholog); Top expressed in: gonad; testicle; monocyte; corpus callosum; Brodmann area 9; C1 segment; islet of Langerhans; right adrenal cortex; substantia nigra; Achilles tendon / Top expressed in: primitive streak; otic vesicle; supraoptic nucleus; retinal pigment epithelium; facial motor nucleus; saccule; otic placode; arcuate nucleus; lacrimal gland; median eminence; More reference expression data
BioGPS	n/a
Orthologs
Databases	NCBI: entry; OMA: entry
Species	Human	Mouse
Entrez	79020	105351
Ensembl	ENSG00000136197	ENSMUSG00000039182
UniProt	Q9BPX7	Q91WD4
RefSeq (mRNA)	NM_001099858; NM_024054; NM_001363436	NM_001104646; NM_134067
RefSeq (protein)	NP_001093328; NP_076959; NP_001350365	NP_001098116; NP_598828
Location (UCSC)	Chr 7: 42.91 – 42.91 Mb	Chr 13: 14.8 – 14.81 Mb
PubMed search
- Wikidata
View/Edit Human	View/Edit Mouse

C7orf25 protein UPF0415 (UPF0415) is a protein encoded on chromosome 7, in open reading frame 25 (C7orf25) and are located at domain of unknown function 1308. C7orf25 is located at the minus strand and encodes 12 proteins, one of them being UPF0415. This protein is believed to be active in the proteosome pathway. C7orf25 protein UPF0415 is not a transmembrane protein and has no signal peptide. UPF0415 has two isoforms, Q9BPX7-1 and Q9BPX7-2. Both consists of two exons that are both highly conserved among vertebrates.

== Background information ==
Gene Size	Protein Size	# of exons	Promoter Sequence	Signal Peptide	Molecular Weight	Chromosome position	Protein Isoelectric point
1844 bp	421 aa	2	~600bp	No	46.45 kDa	7p14	5.76

== Gene neighborhood ==
C7orf25 is an open reading frame that encodes 12 proteins. Most of these are of unknown function. One of these proteins is UPF0415 and another is PSMA2 which is also functional in the proteosome pathway. Other genes located near C7orf25 protein UPF0415 are TCP1P1, HECW1, MIR3943 and MRPL32.

== Predicted mRNA features ==
=== Promoter ===
The promoter for the C7orf25 protein UPF0415 gene spans 600 base pairs from 42,951,804 to 42,952,404 with a predicted transcriptional start site that encodes a sequence of 1844 base pairs. The sequence spans from 42,908,726 to 42,912,090. The promoter region and beginning of the C7orf25 gene (20,008,263 to 20,009,250) is not conserved past primates. This region was used to determine transcription factor interactions.

==== Transcription factors ====
Some of the main transcription factors that bind to the promoter are listed below.

Reference	Detailed Family Information	Start (nucleotide)	End (nucleotide)	Strand
XCPE	Activator-, mediator- and TBP-dependent core promoter element for RNA polymerase II transcription from TATA-less promoters	360	370	-
MIZ1	Myc-interacting Zn finger protein 1	120	130	-
PLAG1	Pleomorphic adenoma gene	160	182	-
FOX proteins	Fork head domain factors	35	51	+
E2FF	E2F-myc activator/cell cycle regulator	357	373	-
MZF1	Myeloid zinc finger 1 factors	497	507	+
HAND	Twist subfamily of class B bHLH transcription factors	335	355	-
RU49	Zinc finger transcription factor RU49, zinc finger proliferation 1 - Zipro1	651	657	-
NF-κB	Nuclear factor kappa B/c-rel	219	233	-
E2FF	E2F-myc activator/cell cycle regulator	492	508	+
SP1F	GC-Box factors SP1/GC	490	506	+
IKRS	Ikaros zinc finger family	64	76	+
STAT1	Signal transducer and activator of transcription	409	427	-
RBP2	Retinoblastoma-binding proteins with demethylase activity	538	546	-
YY1F	Activator/repressor binding to transcription initiation site	553	575	-
SP1F	GC-Box factors SP1/GC	359	375	-
HSF	Heat shock factors	240	264	-
BPTF	Bromodomain and PHD domain transcription factors	423	433	+
ZNF35	Zinc finger protein ZNF35	309	321	+
ETSF	Human and murine ETS1 factors	235	255	+

== Function and expression ==
C7orf25 protein UPF0415 is believed to be active in ATP dependent protein breakdown in the proteosome pathway. It is expressed ubiquitously in humans.

== Homology ==
UPF0415 protein C7orf25 has one paralog which is FLJ18411. UPF0415 is also highly conserved in vertebrates. The following table shows a small selection of orthologs found using BLAST and BLAT and their identity to C7orf25 protein UPF0415.

Genus and species	Accession number	Similarity (aa)
Homo sapiens	NM_001099858	-
Bos taurus (Cow)	NM_001076140.1	95%
Falco cherrug (Falcon)	XM_005446213.1	78%
Xenopus laevis (Frog)	XM_005014944.1	73%

== Predicted protein features ==
=== Post Translational Modifications ===
UPF0415 protein C7orf25 is not a transmembrane protein as it has no transmembrane domains. C7orf25 protein UPF0415 has multiple phosphorylation which are believed to be responsible in protein activation.

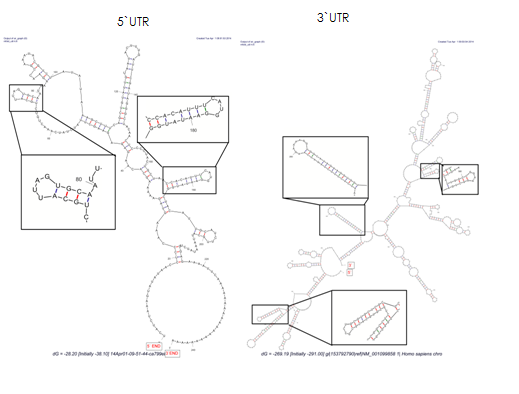
Multiple stem loops have been predicted in both 3' and 5'UTR and these are believed to be functional in gene transcription.

=== Interactions ===
Other proteins that are known to interact with UPF0415 protein C7orf25 are FRA10AC1, FLJ23825 and TUBB (tubulin, beta class I) and only TUBB is associated with proteosome activity.

=== Conceptual presentation ===
All post transnational modifications, genetic or proteomic factors that are relevant for UPF0415 protein C7orf25 transcription and regulation, mentioned above, are annotated in the conceptual translation.

Conceptual translation of C7orf25

== C7orf25 ==
C7orf25 encodes 12 different transcripts. Two of these transcripts are (PSMA2 and UPF0415). No specific phenotypes or polymorphisms are yet to be related to mutations in C7orf25. This suggests that this reading frame is important for survival in vertebrates. The picture below shows all predicted transcripts encoded in C7orf25.

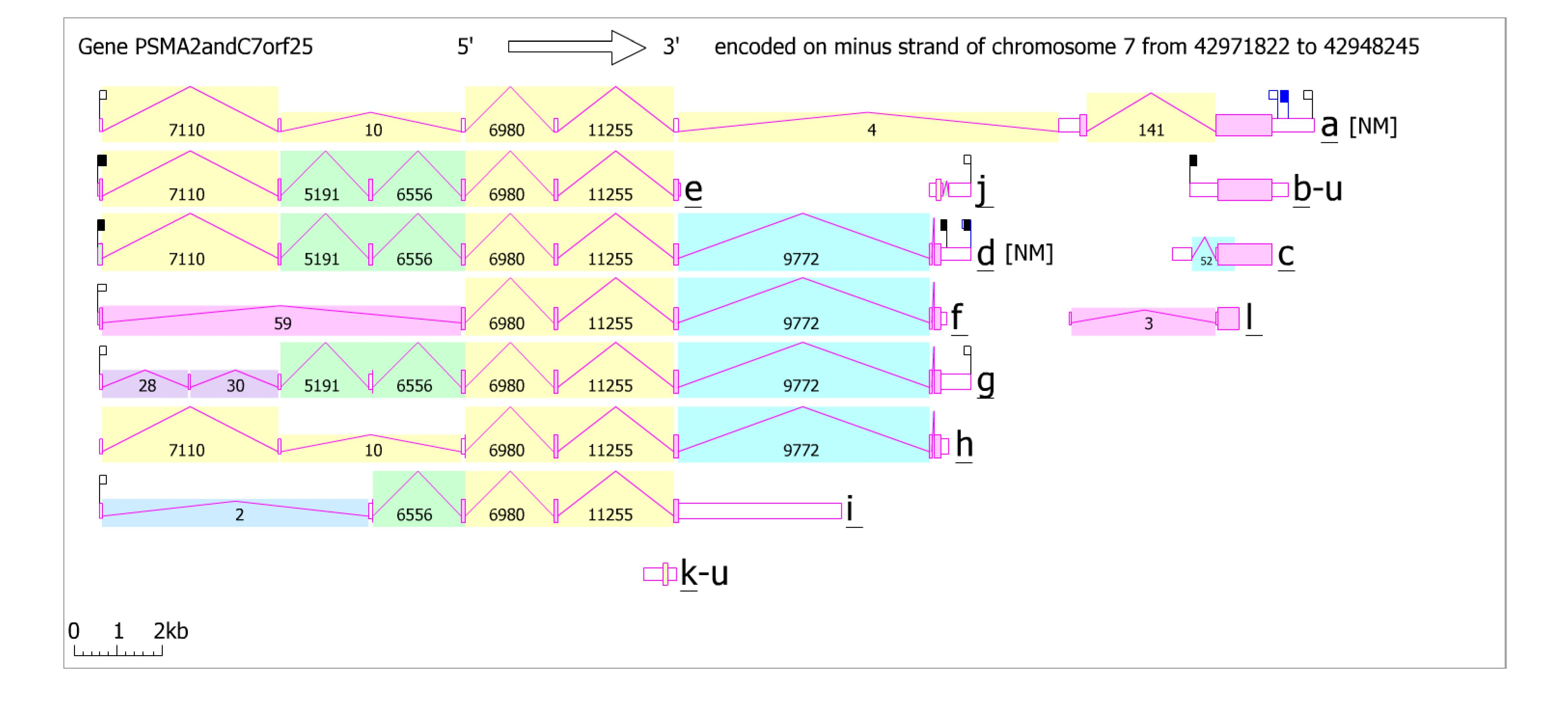
Transcript variants C7orf25
