= CANDLE syndrome =

- CANDLE syndrome is inherited via autosomal recessive manner

Chronic atypical neutrophilic dermatosis with lipodystrophy and elevated temperature (CANDLE) syndrome is an autosomal recessive disorder that presents itself via various autoinflammatory responses throughout the body, multiple types of skin lesions, and recurrent long-term fever symptoms. The current known cause for the disorder is a mutation in the PSMB8 gene or mutations in other closely related genes. The syndrome was first named and classified in March 2010 after four patients were reviewed with similar symptoms. There have been approximately 30 cases reported in the scientific literature as of 2015.

== Signs and symptoms ==
The symptoms of CANDLE syndrome can manifest themselves in a variety of different ways and combinations related to skin disorders, internal inflammatory responses, and fever-based conditions. The types of outwardly visible conditions involve facies not matching other known disorders, contracture of the joints, and skin lesions appearing across any part of the body. The multiple inflammatory developments include nonspecific lymphadenopathy, hepatosplenomegaly, and autoimmune hemolytic anemia. Other possible conditions are hypertriglyceridemia and lipodystrophy.

Other novel mutations resulting in the syndrome have also involved the manifestation of other conditions, such as Sweet's syndrome and pericarditis. Another case in 2015 showcased previously undescribed dental symptoms, such as microdontia and osteopenia of the jaw, along with a general case of diabetes mellitus.

== Causes ==
The most common known cause of the syndrome are mutations in the Proteasome Subunit, Beta Type, 8 (PSMB8) gene that codes for proteasomes that in turn break down other proteins. This occurs specifically when a mutation causes the homozygous recessive form to emerge. The mutated gene results in proteins not being degraded and oxidative proteins building up in cellular tissues, eventually leading to apoptosis, especially in muscle and fat cells.

A study conducted by Brehm et al. in November 2015 discovered additional mutations that can cause CANDLE syndrome, including PSMA3 (encodes α7), PSMB4 (encodes β7), PSMB9 (encodes β1i), and the proteasome maturation protein (POMP), with 8 mutations in total between them. An additional unknown mutation type in the original PSMB8 gene was also noted.

== Treatment ==
Unlike other autoinflammatory disorders, patients with CANDLE do not respond to IL-1 inhibition treatment in order to stop the autoinflammatory response altogether. This suggests that the condition also involves IFN dysregulation.

== History ==
The category that CANDLE syndrome is a part of, along with related disorders, falls under the banner of proteasome-associated autoinflammatory syndromes (PRAAS). The first one to be described was by Nakajo at Tohoku University in 1939, where he collected symptoms including skin lesions, clubbing of the fingers, and various thickening of heart walls. He termed the collective symptoms Nakajo-Nishimura syndrome (NKJO). Further symptoms were added onto the overall condition from work by Nishimura, with the overall symptoms being similar to CANDLE syndrome. A related syndrome was described by Garg et al. in 2010 and titled Joint contractures, Muscular Atrophy, Microcytic anemia, and Panniculitis-induced Lipodystrophy (JMP) syndrome.

The primary differences between the syndromes is the lack of fever in JMP syndrome and the lack of seizures in NKJO syndrome, both of which are present in CANDLE syndrome. Though it has been proposed by Wang et al. that the different syndromes are actually just clinical phenotypic variations of the same syndrome based around different mutations of the PSMB8 gene.
