= Nakajō =

Nakajō (中城, 中条, 仲条, 仲城) is a Japanese surname. It can also refer to:

== People ==
- Fumiko Nakajō (中城 ふみ子, 1922–1954), Japanese tanka poet
- Hiroyuki Nakajo (中條 公行, 1946–2020), Japanese sport shooter
- Hisaya Nakajo (中条 比紗也, 1973–2023), Japanese manga artist

== Places in Japan ==
- Nakajō, Nagano
- Nakajō, Niigata
- Nakajō Station
- Uonuma-Nakajō Station

== Other ==
- Kunito Nakajo (仲条 國士), of Shonan Junai Gumi
- Nakajo syndrome, a rare autosomal recessive congenital disorder
