= PLK1 =

Mammalian protein found in humans

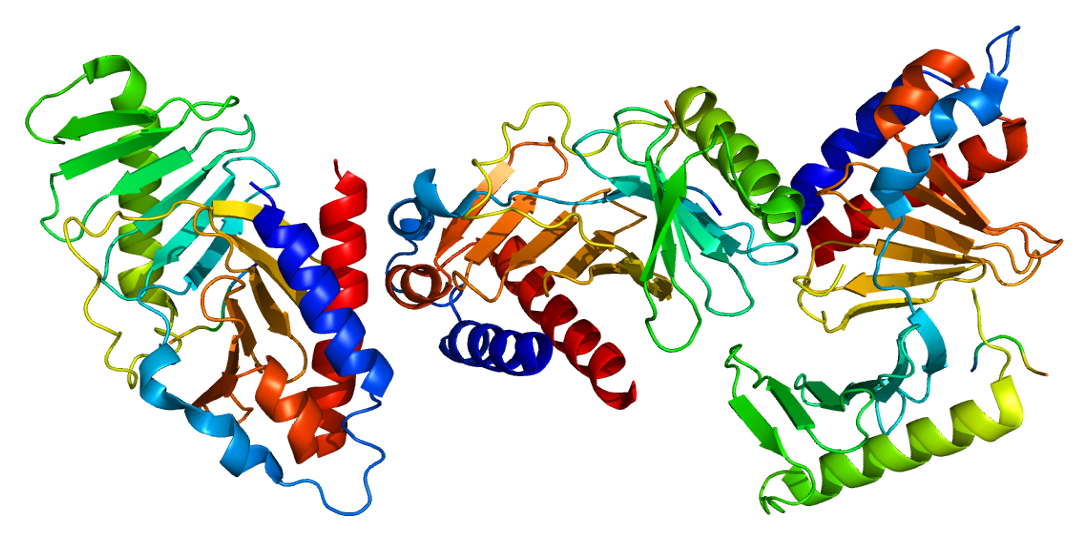

Identifiers
- Aliases: PLK1, PLK, STPK13, polo like kinase 1
- External IDs: OMIM: 602098; MGI: 97621; GeneCards: PLK1
Available structures
PDB	Ortholog search: PDBe RCSB
PDB	List of PDB id codes 1Q4K, 1Q4O, 1UMW, 2OJX, 2OU7, 2OWB, 2RKU, 2V5Q, 2YAC, 3BZI, 3C5L, 3FVH, 3HIH, 3HIK, 3KB7, 3P2W, 3P2Z, 3P34, 3P35, 3P36, 3P37, 3Q1I, 3RQ7, 3THB, 4A4L, 4A4O, 4DFW, 4E67, 4E9C, 4E9D, 4H5X, 4H71, 4HAB, 4HCO, 4HY2, 4J52, 4J53, 4LKL, 4LKM, 4O56, 4O6W, 4O9W, 4RCP, 4WHH, 4WHL, 4X9R, 4X9V, 4X9W, 2OGQ, 5J19
Enzyme activity
EC #	BRENDA	ExPASy	KEGG	MetaCyc
2.7.11.21	↗	↗	↗	↗

Gene location (Human)
Chr.	Chromosome 16 (human)
Band	16p12.2	Start	23,677,656 bp
Band	16p12.2	End	23,690,367 bp

Gene location (Mouse)
Chr.	Chromosome 7 (mouse)
Band	7 F2|7 65.52 cM	Start	121,758,662 bp
Band	7 F2|7 65.52 cM	End	121,769,096 bp
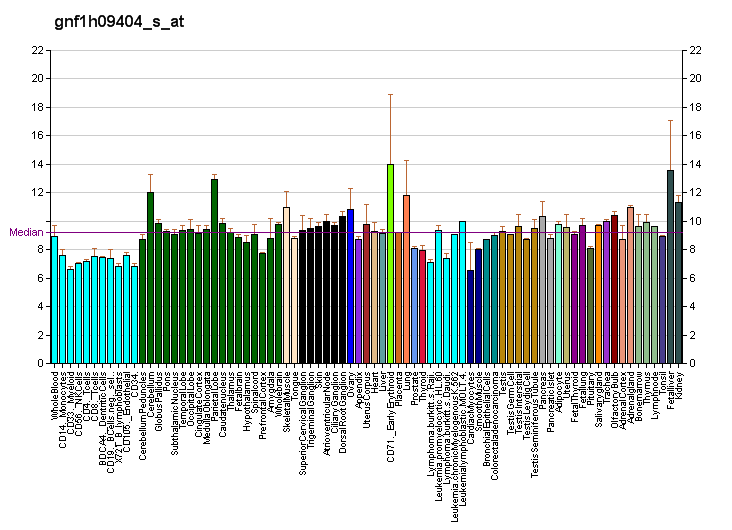

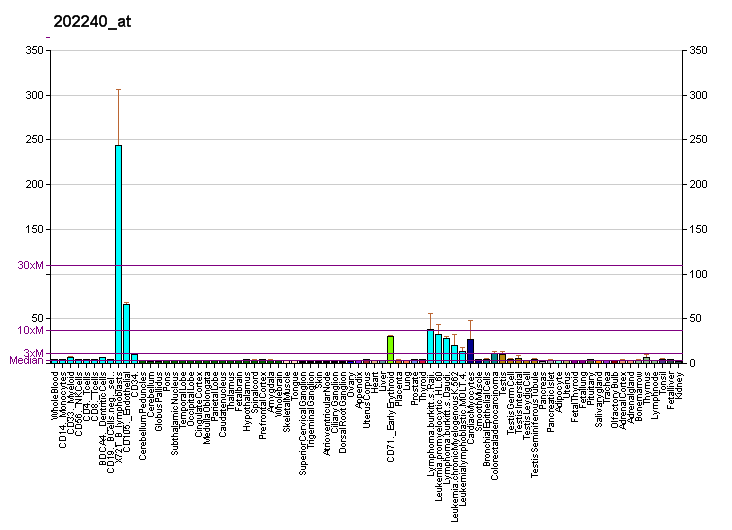
RNA expression pattern
Bgee	Human / Mouse (ortholog); Top expressed in: ventricular zone; gonad; ganglionic eminence; mucosa of transverse colon; left testis; right testis; stromal cell of endometrium; rectum; testicle; secondary oocyte / Top expressed in: tail of embryo; epiblast; otic vesicle; zygote; otic placode; spermatid; yolk sac; secondary oocyte; abdominal wall; primitive streak; More reference expression data
BioGPS	More reference expression data
Gene ontology
Molecular function	transferase activity; nucleotide binding; microtubule binding; kinase activity; protein binding; anaphase-promoting complex binding; protein kinase binding; protein serine/threonine kinase activity; magnesium ion binding; protein kinase activity; ATP binding; identical protein binding
Cellular component	cytosol; centrosome; spindle pole; microtubule cytoskeleton; spindle; nucleoplasm; chromosome; microtubule organizing center; midbody; spindle microtubule; spindle midzone; chromatin; synaptonemal complex; chromosome, centromeric region; cytoskeleton; nucleus; kinetochore; cytoplasm; centriole; centriolar satellite
Biological process	phosphorylation; negative regulation of cyclin-dependent protein serine/threonine kinase activity; establishment of protein localization; synaptonemal complex disassembly; mitotic cytokinesis; negative regulation of apoptotic process; negative regulation of transcription by RNA polymerase II; homologous chromosome segregation; regulation of mitotic spindle assembly; mitotic spindle assembly checkpoint signaling; regulation of cell cycle; cell division; mitotic nuclear membrane disassembly; G2/M transition of mitotic cell cycle; positive regulation of peptidyl-threonine phosphorylation; peptidyl-serine phosphorylation; microtubule bundle formation; protein ubiquitination; protein destabilization; regulation of mitotic cell cycle; positive regulation of ubiquitin-protein transferase activity; positive regulation of proteolysis; mitotic sister chromatid segregation; regulation of mitotic metaphase/anaphase transition; cell cycle; anaphase-promoting complex-dependent catabolic process; cell population proliferation; regulation of protein binding; protein localization to chromatin; positive regulation of proteasomal ubiquitin-dependent protein catabolic process; female meiosis chromosome segregation; positive regulation of protein localization to nucleus; sister chromatid cohesion; regulation of cell cycle G2/M phase transition; mitotic cell cycle; protein phosphorylation; centrosome cycle; nuclear membrane disassembly; protein localization to nuclear envelope; ciliary basal body-plasma membrane docking; positive regulation of ubiquitin protein ligase activity; regulation of G2/M transition of mitotic cell cycle; regulation of cytokinesis; mitotic G2 DNA damage checkpoint signaling; protein localization to organelle; regulation of mitotic cell cycle phase transition; ubiquitin-dependent protein catabolic process; establishment of mitotic spindle orientation; regulation of protein localization to cell cortex
Sources:Amigo / QuickGO
Orthologs
Databases	NCBI: entry; OMA: entry
Species	Human	Mouse
Entrez	5347	18817
Ensembl	ENSG00000166851	ENSMUSG00000030867
UniProt	P53350	Q07832
RefSeq (mRNA)	NM_005030	NM_011121
RefSeq (protein)	NP_005021	NP_035251
Location (UCSC)	Chr 16: 23.68 – 23.69 Mb	Chr 7: 121.76 – 121.77 Mb
PubMed search
- Wikidata
View/Edit Human	View/Edit Mouse

Serine/threonine-protein kinase PLK1, also known as polo-like kinase 1 (PLK-1) or serine/threonine-protein kinase 13 (STPK13), is an enzyme that in humans is encoded by the PLK1 (polo-like kinase 1) gene.

== Structure ==
PLK1 consists of 603 amino acids and is 66kDa. In addition to the N-terminus kinase domain, there are two conserved polo-box regions of 30 amino acids at the C-terminus. Kinase activity is regulated at least in part, by the polo-boxes that are functionally important for both auto-inhibition and subcellular localization.

== Localization ==
During interphase, PLK1 localizes to centrosomes. In early mitosis, it associates with mitotic spindle poles. A recombinant GFP-PLK1 protein localizes to centromere/kinetochore region, suggesting a possible role for chromosome separation.

== Cell cycle regulation ==
Plk1 is an early trigger for G2/M transition. Plk1 supports the functional maturation of the centrosome in late G2/early prophase and establishment of the bipolar spindle. Plk1 phosphorylates and activates cdc25C, a phosphatase that dephosphorylates and activates the cyclinB/cdc2 complex. Plk phosphorylates and activates components of the anaphase-promoting complex (APC). The APC, which is activated by Fizzy-Cdc20 family proteins, is a cell cycle ubiquitin-protein ligase (E3) that degrades mitotic cyclins, chromosomal proteins that maintain cohesion of sister chromatids, and anaphase inhibitors. Abnormal spindle (Asp), a Polo kinase substrate, is a microtubule-associated protein essential for correct behavior of spindle poles and M-phase microtubules. Plk1 localizes to the central region of the spindle in late mitosis and associates with kinesin-like protein CHO1/MKLP1. The homologous motor protein in Drosophila is the pavarotti gene product (PAR). Studies have shown that the loss of PLK1 expression can induce pro-apoptotic pathways and inhibit growth.

=== Meiosis ===
Based on yeast and murine studies of meiosis, human PLK1 may also have a regulatory function in meiosis. S. cerevisiae polo kinase CDC5 is required to phosphorylate and remove meiotic cohesion during the first cell division. In CDC5 depleted cells, kinetochores are bioriented during meiosis I, and Mam1, a protein essential for coorientation, fails to associate with kinetochores. CDC5 is believed to have roles in sister-kinetochore coorientation and chromosome segregation during meiosis I.

PLK1 functions during meiotic centrosome biogenesis in mouse spermatocytes, thus facilitating accurate chromosome segregation during spermatogenesis.

== Role in tumorigenesis ==
Plk1 is considered a proto-oncogene, whose overexpression is often observed in tumor cells. Aneuploidy and tumorigenesis can also result from centrosome abnormality, particularly centrosome amplification defects. Centrosome duplication and maturation regulated by Plk1 occurs from late S phase to prophase. Abnormal centrosome amplification may lead to multipolar spindles and results in unequal segregation of chromosomes. Plk1 overexpression also increases the centrosome size and/or centrosome number, which will also lead to improper segregation of chromosomes, aneuploidy, and tumorigenesis.

Oncogenic properties of PLK1 are believed to be due to its role in driving cell cycle progression. Supporting evidence comes from the overexpression studies of PLK1 in NIH3T3 cell line. These cells become capable of forming foci and growing in soft agar and more importantly, these cells can form tumors in nude mice due to PLK1 overexpression.

PLK1 has also been linked to known pathways that are altered during the neoplastic transformation. Retinoblastoma tumor suppressor (RB) pathway activation results in the repression of PLK1 promoter in a SWI/SNF chromatin remodeling complex dependent manner. In case of RB inactivation, PLK1 expression seems to be deregulated. This new finding suggests that PLK1 may be a target of the retinoblastoma tumor suppressor (RB) pathway.

Moreover, PLK1 seems to be involved in the tumor suppressor p53 related pathways. Evidence suggests that PLK1 can inhibit transactivation and pro-apoptotic functions of p53 function by physical interaction and phosphorylation.

== Clinical significance ==
PLK1 is being studied as a target for cancer drugs. Many colon and lung cancers are caused by K-RAS mutations. These cancers are dependent on PLK1.

When PLK1 expression was silenced with RNA interference in cell culture, K-RAS cells were selectively killed, without harming normal cells.

PLK1 inhibitor volasertib is being evaluated in clinical trials for use in acute myeloid leukemia (AML). A combination of PLK1 and EGFR inhibition overcomes T790M-mediated drug resistance in vitro and in vivo in non-small cell lung cancer (NSCLC). In HNSCC mutations of the AJUBA mediate sensitivity to treatment with cell-cycle inhibitors including Plk1 inhibitor volasertib. In mesenchymal NSCLC cells, cMet phosphorylation is regulated by Plk1‐mediated vimentin phosphorylation via β1‐integrin. The combination of cMet and Plk1 inhibition led to significant tumor regression in NSCLC in vivo models treated with clinically relevant drugs.

Rigosertib is an experimental RAS/PI3K/PLK1 inhibitor.

== Interactions ==
PLK1 has been shown to interact with:

- CHEK2,
- NUDC,
- PIN1,
- PSMA3,
- PSMA5,
- PSMA6,
- PSMA7,
- PSMB3, and
- TSC1.
- Vimentin

Structural analysis has been used to explain the broad specificity of PLK1.

== See also ==
- Polo-like kinases, the gene family that PLK1 belongs to
