= PSMB4 =

Protein found in humans

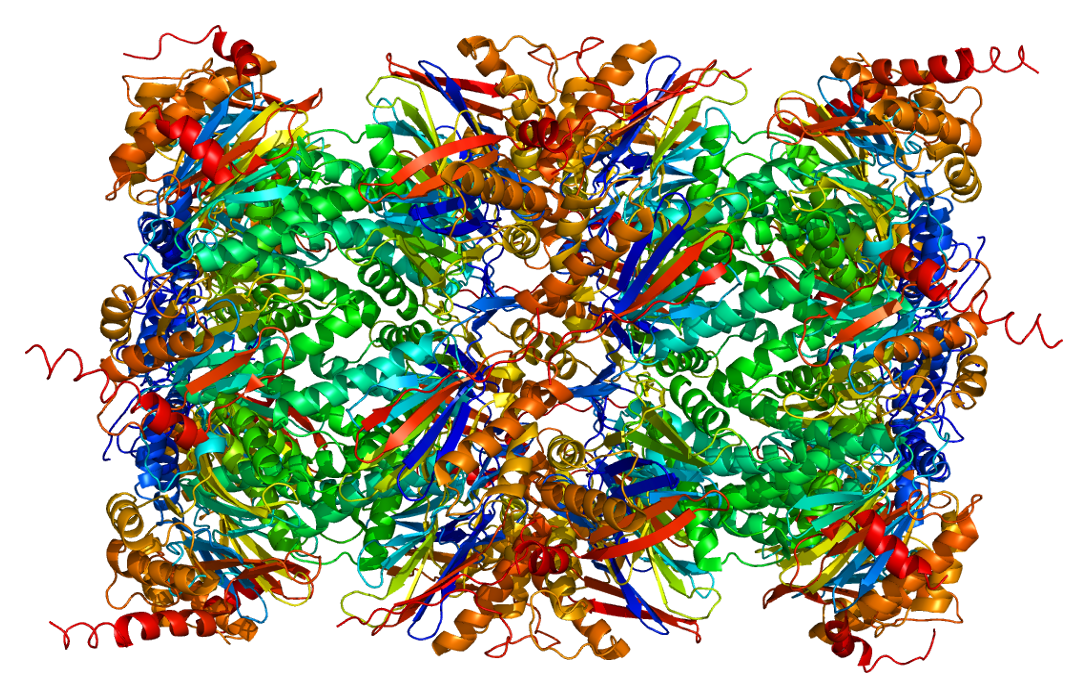

Identifiers
- Aliases: PSMB4, HN3, HsN3, PROS-26, PROS26, proteasome subunit beta 4, PRAAS3, proteasome 20S subunit beta 4
- External IDs: OMIM: 602177; MGI: 1098257; GeneCards: PSMB4
Available structures
PDB	Ortholog search: PDBe RCSB
PDB	List of PDB id codes 4R3O, 4R67, 5A0Q

Gene location (Human)
Chr.	Chromosome 1 (human)
Band	1q21.3	Start	151,399,560 bp
Band	1q21.3	End	151,401,937 bp

Gene location (Mouse)
Chr.	Chromosome 3 (mouse)
Band	3 F2.1|3 40.74 cM	Start	94,791,404 bp
Band	3 F2.1|3 40.74 cM	End	94,794,272 bp
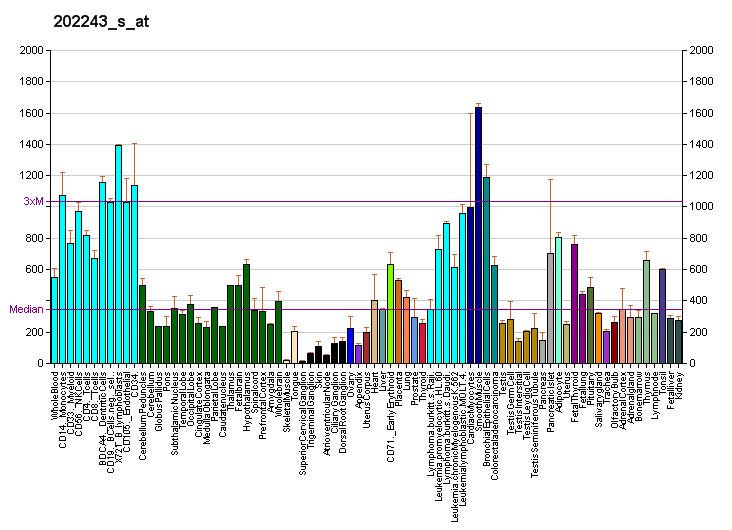

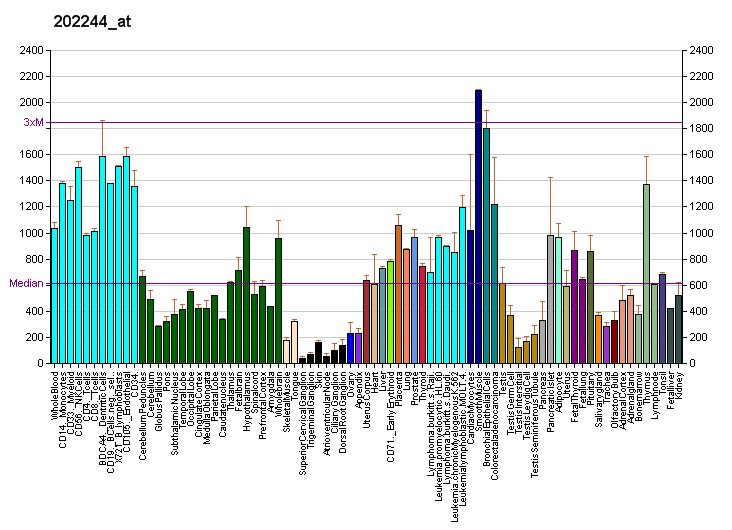
RNA expression pattern
Bgee	Human / Mouse (ortholog); Top expressed in: epithelium of nasopharynx; right adrenal gland; anterior pituitary; palpebral conjunctiva; gastric mucosa; body of uterus; right adrenal cortex; left adrenal gland; left adrenal cortex; smooth muscle tissue / Top expressed in: external carotid artery; internal carotid artery; epithelium of lens; medullary collecting duct; endocardial cushion; ureter; primitive streak; Gonadal ridge; renal corpuscle; hair follicle; More reference expression data
BioGPS	More reference expression data
Gene ontology
Molecular function	endopeptidase activity; lipopolysaccharide binding; peptidase activity; protein binding; threonine-type endopeptidase activity; hydrolase activity
Cellular component	cytoplasm; cytosol; nucleoplasm; proteasome complex; extracellular exosome; nucleus; proteasome core complex; proteasome core complex, beta-subunit complex
Biological process	regulation of cellular amino acid metabolic process; antigen processing and presentation of exogenous peptide antigen via MHC class I, TAP-dependent; regulation of mRNA stability; positive regulation of canonical Wnt signaling pathway; protein polyubiquitination; stimulatory C-type lectin receptor signaling pathway; tumor necrosis factor-mediated signaling pathway; MAPK cascade; proteolysis; Fc-epsilon receptor signaling pathway; NIK/NF-kappaB signaling; negative regulation of inflammatory response to antigenic stimulus; anaphase-promoting complex-dependent catabolic process; proteolysis involved in cellular protein catabolic process; T cell receptor signaling pathway; negative regulation of canonical Wnt signaling pathway; proteasome-mediated ubiquitin-dependent protein catabolic process; viral process; Wnt signaling pathway, planar cell polarity pathway; negative regulation of G2/M transition of mitotic cell cycle; protein deubiquitination; SCF-dependent proteasomal ubiquitin-dependent protein catabolic process; transmembrane transport; regulation of transcription from RNA polymerase II promoter in response to hypoxia; post-translational protein modification; regulation of hematopoietic stem cell differentiation; proteasomal protein catabolic process; proteasomal ubiquitin-independent protein catabolic process; interleukin-1-mediated signaling pathway; regulation of mitotic cell cycle phase transition
Sources:Amigo / QuickGO
Orthologs
Databases	NCBI: entry; OMA: entry
Species	Human	Mouse
Entrez	5692	19172
Ensembl	ENSG00000159377	ENSMUSG00000005779
UniProt	P28070	P99026
RefSeq (mRNA)	NM_002796	NM_008945
RefSeq (protein)	NP_002787	NP_032971
Location (UCSC)	Chr 1: 151.4 – 151.4 Mb	Chr 3: 94.79 – 94.79 Mb
PubMed search
- Wikidata
View/Edit Human	View/Edit Mouse

Proteasome subunit beta type-4 also known as 20S proteasome subunit beta-7 (based on systematic nomenclature) is a protein that in humans is encoded by the PSMB4 gene.

This protein is one of the 17 essential subunits (alpha subunits 1–7, constitutive beta subunits 1–7, and inducible subunits including beta1i, beta2i, beta5i) that contributes to the complete assembly of 20S proteasome complex. In particular, proteasome subunit beta type-2, along with other beta subunits, assemble into two heptameric rings and subsequently a proteolytic chamber for substrate degradation. The eukaryotic proteasome recognized degradable proteins, including damaged proteins for protein quality control purpose or key regulatory protein components for dynamic biological processes. An essential function of a modified proteasome, the immunoproteasome, is the processing of class I MHC peptides.

== Structure ==
=== Gene ===
This gene PSMB4 encodes a member of the proteasome B-type family, also known as the T1B family, that is a 20S core beta subunit. The gene has 7 exons and locates at chromosome band 1q21.

=== Protein ===
The human protein proteasome subunit beta type-2 is 23 kDa in size and composed of 219 amino acids. The calculated theoretical pI of this protein is 5.47.

=== Complex assembly ===
The proteasome is a multicatalytic proteinase complex with a highly ordered 20S core structure. This barrel-shaped core structure is composed of 4 axially stacked rings of 28 non-identical subunits: the two end rings are each formed by 7 alpha subunits, and the two central rings are each formed by 7 beta subunits. Three beta subunits (beta1, beta2, and beta5) each contains a proteolytic active site and has distinct substrate preferences. Proteasomes are distributed throughout eukaryotic cells at a high concentration and cleave peptides in an ATP/ubiquitin-dependent process in a non-lysosomal pathway.

== Function ==
Protein functions are supported by its tertiary structure and its interaction with associating partners. As one of 28 subunits of 20S proteasome, protein proteasome subunit beta type-4 contributes to form a proteolytic environment for substrate degradation. Evidences of the crystal structures of isolated 20S proteasome complex demonstrate that the two rings of beta subunits form a proteolytic chamber and maintain all their active sites of proteolysis within the chamber. Concomitantly, the rings of alpha subunits form the entrance for substrates entering the proteolytic chamber. In an inactivated 20S proteasome complex, the gate into the internal proteolytic chamber are guarded by the N-terminal tails of specific alpha-subunit. This unique structure design prevents random encounter between proteolytic active sites and protein substrate, which makes protein degradation a well-regulated process. 20S proteasome complex, by itself, is usually functionally inactive. The proteolytic capacity of 20S core particle (CP) can be activated when CP associates with one or two regulatory particles (RP) on one or both side of alpha rings. These regulatory particles include 19S proteasome complexes, 11S proteasome complex, etc. Following the CP-RP association, the confirmation of certain alpha subunits will change and consequently cause the opening of substrate entrance gate. Besides RPs, the 20S proteasomes can also be effectively activated by other mild chemical treatments, such as exposure to low levels of sodium dodecylsulfate (SDS) or NP-14.

== Clinical significance ==
The proteasome and its subunits are of clinical significance for at least two reasons: (1) a compromised complex assembly or a dysfunctional proteasome can be associated with the underlying pathophysiology of specific diseases, and (2) they can be exploited as drug targets for therapeutic interventions. Recently, more effort has also been made to consider the proteasome for the development of novel diagnostic markers and strategies. An improved and comprehensive understanding of the pathophysiology of the proteasome should lead to clinical applications in the future.

The proteasomes form a pivotal component for the ubiquitin–proteasome system (UPS) and corresponding cellular Protein Quality Control (PQC). Protein ubiquitination and subsequent proteolysis and degradation by the proteasome are important mechanisms in the regulation of the cell cycle, cell growth and differentiation, gene transcription, signal transduction and apoptosis. Subsequently, a compromised proteasome complex assembly and function lead to reduced proteolytic activities and the accumulation of damaged or misfolded protein species. Such protein accumulation may contribute to the pathogenesis and phenotypic characteristics in neurodegenerative diseases, cardiovascular diseases, inflammatory responses and autoimmune diseases, and systemic DNA damage responses leading to malignancies.

Several experimental and clinical studies have indicated that aberrations and deregulations of the UPS contribute to the pathogenesis of several neurodegenerative and myodegenerative disorders, including Alzheimer's disease, Parkinson's disease and Pick's disease, Amyotrophic lateral sclerosis (ALS), Huntington's disease, Creutzfeldt–Jakob disease, and motor neuron diseases, polyglutamine (PolyQ) diseases, Muscular dystrophies and several rare forms of neurodegenerative diseases associated with dementia. As part of the ubiquitin–proteasome system (UPS), the proteasome maintains cardiac protein homeostasis and thus plays a significant role in cardiac ischemic injury, ventricular hypertrophy and heart failure. Additionally, evidence is accumulating that the UPS plays an essential role in malignant transformation. UPS proteolysis plays a major role in responses of cancer cells to stimulatory signals that are critical for the development of cancer. Accordingly, gene expression by degradation of transcription factors, such as p53, c-jun, c-Fos, NF-κB, c-Myc, HIF-1α, MATα2, STAT3, sterol-regulated element-binding proteins and androgen receptors are all controlled by the UPS and thus involved in the development of various malignancies. Moreover, the UPS regulates the degradation of tumor suppressor gene products such as adenomatous polyposis coli (APC) in colorectal cancer, retinoblastoma (Rb). and von Hippel–Lindau tumor suppressor (VHL), as well as a number of proto-oncogenes (Raf, Myc, Myb, Rel, Src, Mos, ABL). The UPS is also involved in the regulation of inflammatory responses. This activity is usually attributed to the role of proteasomes in the activation of NF-κB which further regulates the expression of pro inflammatory cytokines such as TNF-α, IL-β, IL-8, adhesion molecules (ICAM-1, VCAM-1, P-selectin) and prostaglandins and nitric oxide (NO). Additionally, the UPS also plays a role in inflammatory responses as regulators of leukocyte proliferation, mainly through proteolysis of cyclines and the degradation of CDK inhibitors. Lastly, autoimmune disease patients with SLE, Sjögren syndrome and rheumatoid arthritis (RA) predominantly exhibit circulating proteasomes which can be applied as clinical biomarkers.

Proteasomal subunit PSMB4 (proteasome subunit beta type-4 also known as 20S proteasome subunit beta-7) has been suggested as a survival gene in an animal model of hepatocellular carcinoma and in glioblastoma cell lines. Additionally, gene expression levels of proteasomal subunits (PSMA1, PSMA5, PSMB4, PSMB5 and PSMD1) were investigated in 80 neuroendocrine pulmonary tumors and compared to controls and it was further revealed that PSMB4 mRNA was significantly associated with the proliferative activity of neuroendocrine pulmonary tumors. Thus far, it appears that PSMB4 may have significant roles in underlying processes and mechanisms of malignancies.

== Interactions ==
PSMB4 has been shown to interact with Mothers against decapentaplegic homolog 1.
