= Rigosertib =

Names
- IUPAC name (2-Methoxy-5-{[(E)-2-(2,4,6-trimethoxyphenyl)ethene-1-sulfonyl]methyl}phenyl)glycine
- Systematic IUPAC name (2-Methoxy-5-{[(E)-2-(2,4,6-trimethoxyphenyl)ethene-1-sulfonyl]methyl}anilino)acetate
- Other names ON-01910

Identifiers
CAS Number	592542-59-1
3D model (JSmol)	: Interactive image
ChEBI	CHEBI:145417
ChEMBL	ChEMBL1241855; ChEMBL2013119
ChemSpider	5293927
IUPHAR/BPS	7833
KEGG	D10154
PubChem CID	6918736
UNII	67DOW7F9GL
CompTox Dashboard (EPA)	DTXSID30207984
- InChI: InChI=1S/C21H25NO8S/c1-27-15-10-19(29-3)16(20(11-15)30-4)7-8-31(25,26)13-14-5-6-18(28-2)17(9-14)22-12-21(23)24/h5-11,22H,12-13H2,1-4H3,(H,23,24)/b8-7+ Key: OWBFCJROIKNMGD-BQYQJAHWSA-N
- SMILES: : COC1=C(C=C(C=C1)CS(=O)(=O)/C=C/C2=C(C=C(C=C2OC)OC)OC)NCC(=O)O

Properties
Chemical formula	C_{21}H_{25}NO_{8}S
Molar mass	451.49 g·mol^{−1}
- Except where otherwise noted, data are given for materials in their standard state (at 25 °C [77 °F], 100 kPa). Infobox references

Rigosertib (ON-01910 sodium salt, with Estybon as trade name) is a synthetic benzyl styryl sulfone in development by Onconova Therapeutics. Rigosertib is in phase III clinical trials for the treatment of chronic myelomonocytic leukemia.

Its geometrical isomer (Z)-ON 01910·Na has less cytotoxicity on cancer cells.

== Mechanism ==
Rigosertib is a microtubule-destabilizing agent.
