= FRA10AC1 =

Protein-coding gene in the species Homo sapiens

Identifiers
- Aliases: FRA10AC1, C10orf4, F26C11.1-like, FRA10A, fragile site, folic acid type, rare, fra(10)(q23.3) or fra(10)(q24.2) candidate 1, FRA10A associated CGG repeat 1
- External IDs: OMIM: 608866; MGI: 1917817; GeneCards: FRA10AC1

Gene location (Human)
Chr.	Chromosome 10 (human)
Band	10q23.33	Start	93,667,883 bp
Band	10q23.33	End	93,702,592 bp

Gene location (Mouse)
Chr.	Chromosome 19 (mouse)
Band	19|19 C2	Start	38,176,929 bp
Band	19|19 C2	End	38,212,604 bp
RNA expression pattern
Bgee	Human / Mouse (ortholog); Top expressed in: tendon of biceps brachii; lateral nuclear group of thalamus; internal globus pallidus; pars reticulata; external globus pallidus; pars compacta; pancreatic epithelial cell; Achilles tendon; endothelial cell; germinal epithelium / Top expressed in: otolith organ; utricle; fossa; hand; primary oocyte; tail of embryo; genital tubercle; neural layer of retina; condyle; yolk sac; More reference expression data
BioGPS	n/a
Orthologs
Databases	NCBI: entry; OMA: entry
Species	Human	Mouse
Entrez	118924	70567
Ensembl	ENSG00000148690	ENSMUSG00000054237
UniProt	Q70Z53	Q8BP78
RefSeq (mRNA)	NM_145246; NM_203438; NM_203439; NM_203440; NM_203441 NM_001347712; NM_001347713; NM_001347714; NM_001347715	NM_001081075; NM_027466
RefSeq (protein)	NP_001334641; NP_001334642; NP_001334643; NP_001334644; NP_660289	NP_001074544; NP_081742
Location (UCSC)	Chr 10: 93.67 – 93.7 Mb	Chr 19: 38.18 – 38.21 Mb
PubMed search
- Wikidata
View/Edit Human	View/Edit Mouse

FRA10AC1 is a protein that in humans is encoded by the FRA10AC1 gene.

== Function ==
The protein encoded by this gene is a nuclear phosphoprotein of unknown function. The 5' UTR of this gene is part of a CpG island and contains a tandem CGG repeat region that normally consists of 8-14 repeats but can expand to over 200 repeats. The expanded allele becomes hyper-methylated and is not transcribed; however, an expanded repeat region has not been associated with any disease phenotype. This gene is found within the rare FRA10A folate-sensitive fragile site.
