= ZNF35 =

Protein-coding gene in the species Homo sapiens

Identifiers
- Aliases: ZNF35, HF.10, HF10, Zfp105, zinc finger protein 35
- External IDs: OMIM: 194533; MGI: 1277119; GeneCards: ZNF35

Gene location (Human)
Chr.	Chromosome 3 (human)
Band	3p21.31	Start	44,648,732 bp
Band	3p21.31	End	44,660,791 bp

Gene location (Mouse)
Chr.	Chromosome 9 (mouse)
Band	9 F4|9 73.23 cM	Start	122,752,137 bp
Band	9 F4|9 73.23 cM	End	122,760,093 bp
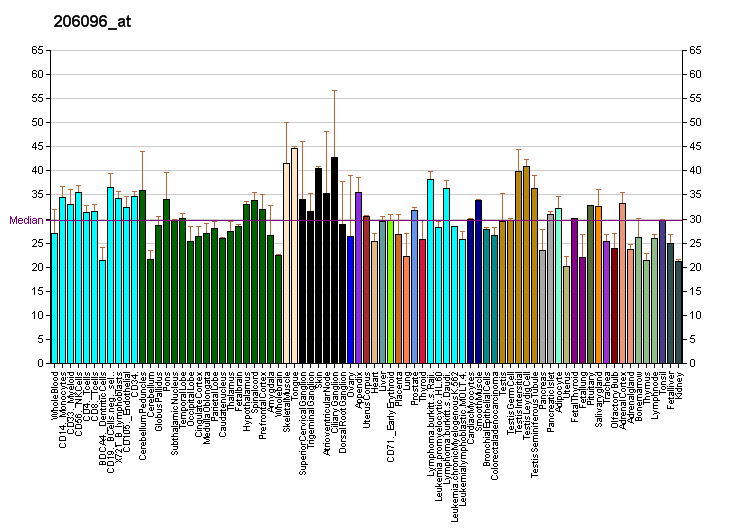
RNA expression pattern
Bgee	Human / Mouse (ortholog); Top expressed in: testicle; gonad; corpus callosum; tonsil; islet of Langerhans; ganglionic eminence; bone marrow cell; smooth muscle tissue; skeletal muscle tissue; stromal cell of endometrium / Top expressed in: seminiferous tubule; medial ganglionic eminence; primitive streak; ventricular zone; abdominal wall; genital tubercle; epiblast; spermatid; embryo; ureter; More reference expression data
BioGPS	More reference expression data
Gene ontology
Molecular function	DNA-binding transcription factor activity; DNA binding; sequence-specific DNA binding; metal ion binding; nucleic acid binding; DNA-binding transcription factor activity, RNA polymerase II-specific
Cellular component	perinuclear region of cytoplasm; nucleus
Biological process	cellular response to retinoic acid; regulation of transcription, DNA-templated; transcription, DNA-templated; spermatogenesis; regulation of transcription by RNA polymerase II
Sources:Amigo / QuickGO
Orthologs
Databases	NCBI: entry; OMA: entry
Species	Human	Mouse
Entrez	7584	22646
Ensembl	ENSG00000281306; ENSG00000169981	ENSMUSG00000057895
UniProt	P13682	n/a
RefSeq (mRNA)	NM_003420	NM_009544
RefSeq (protein)	NP_003411	n/a
Location (UCSC)	Chr 3: 44.65 – 44.66 Mb	Chr 9: 122.75 – 122.76 Mb
PubMed search
- Wikidata
View/Edit Human	View/Edit Mouse

Zinc finger protein 35 is a protein that in humans is encoded by the ZNF35 gene.

== See also ==
- Zinc finger
