= PSMA8 =

Protein found in humans

Identifiers
- Aliases: PSMA8, PSMA7L, proteasome subunit alpha 8, proteasome 20S subunit alpha 8
- External IDs: OMIM: 617841; MGI: 1920927; GeneCards: PSMA8
Available structures
PDB	Ortholog search: PDBe RCSB
PDB	List of PDB id codes 4R3O, 4R67

Gene location (Human)
Chr.	Chromosome 18 (human)
Band	18q11.2	Start	26,133,852 bp
Band	18q11.2	End	26,193,355 bp

Gene location (Mouse)
Chr.	Chromosome 18 (mouse)
Band	18|18 A1	Start	14,839,208 bp
Band	18|18 A1	End	14,895,358 bp
RNA expression pattern
Bgee	Human / Mouse (ortholog); Top expressed in: right testis; sperm; left testis; testicle; buccal mucosa cell; gonad; lymph node; granulocyte; appendix; pharynx / Top expressed in: spermatocyte; spermatid; seminiferous tubule; blastocyst; embryo; embryo; endocardial cushion; atrioventricular valve; morula; Gonadal ridge; More reference expression data
BioGPS	n/a
Gene ontology
Molecular function	endopeptidase activity; peptidase activity; threonine-type endopeptidase activity; hydrolase activity
Cellular component	cytoplasm; cytosol; spermatoproteasome complex; proteasome complex; extracellular exosome; nucleus; proteasome core complex; proteasome core complex, alpha-subunit complex
Biological process	regulation of cellular amino acid metabolic process; antigen processing and presentation of exogenous peptide antigen via MHC class I, TAP-dependent; regulation of mRNA stability; ubiquitin-dependent protein catabolic process; positive regulation of canonical Wnt signaling pathway; protein polyubiquitination; stimulatory C-type lectin receptor signaling pathway; tumor necrosis factor-mediated signaling pathway; MAPK cascade; proteolysis; Fc-epsilon receptor signaling pathway; NIK/NF-kappaB signaling; anaphase-promoting complex-dependent catabolic process; proteolysis involved in cellular protein catabolic process; T cell receptor signaling pathway; negative regulation of canonical Wnt signaling pathway; Wnt signaling pathway, planar cell polarity pathway; proteasome-mediated ubiquitin-dependent protein catabolic process; negative regulation of G2/M transition of mitotic cell cycle; protein deubiquitination; SCF-dependent proteasomal ubiquitin-dependent protein catabolic process; transmembrane transport; regulation of transcription from RNA polymerase II promoter in response to hypoxia; post-translational protein modification; regulation of hematopoietic stem cell differentiation; proteasomal protein catabolic process; proteasomal ubiquitin-independent protein catabolic process; interleukin-1-mediated signaling pathway; regulation of mitotic cell cycle phase transition
Sources:Amigo / QuickGO
Orthologs
Databases	NCBI: entry; OMA: entry
Species	Human	Mouse
Entrez	143471	73677
Ensembl	ENSG00000154611	ENSMUSG00000036743
UniProt	Q8TAA3	Q9CWH6
RefSeq (mRNA)	NM_001025096; NM_001025097; NM_001308188; NM_144662	NM_001163609; NM_001360823
RefSeq (protein)	NP_001020267; NP_001020268; NP_001295117; NP_653263	NP_001157081; NP_001347752
Location (UCSC)	Chr 18: 26.13 – 26.19 Mb	Chr 18: 14.84 – 14.9 Mb
PubMed search
- Wikidata
View/Edit Human	View/Edit Mouse

Proteasome subunit alpha 8 also known as proteasome subunit alpha type-7-like is a protein that in humans is encoded by the PSMA8 gene. Proteasome subunit alpha 8 is a component of the sperm specific proteasome.
