= PSMA3 =

Protein found in humans

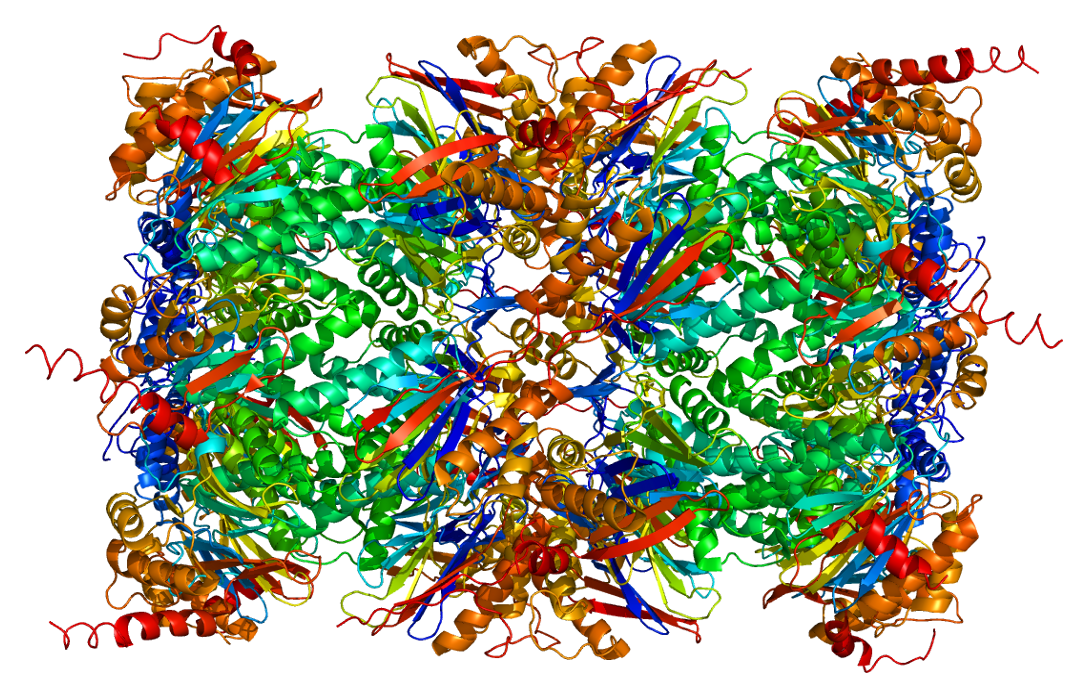

Identifiers
- Aliases: PSMA3, HC8, PSC3, proteasome subunit alpha 3, proteasome 20S subunit alpha 3
- External IDs: OMIM: 176843; MGI: 104883; GeneCards: PSMA3
Available structures
PDB	Ortholog search: PDBe RCSB
PDB	List of PDB id codes 4R3O, 4R67, 5DSV, 5A0Q

Gene location (Human)
Chr.	Chromosome 14 (human)
Band	14q23.1	Start	58,244,843 bp
Band	14q23.1	End	58,272,012 bp

Gene location (Mouse)
Chr.	Chromosome 12 (mouse)
Band	12|12 C2	Start	71,021,395 bp
Band	12|12 C2	End	71,043,121 bp
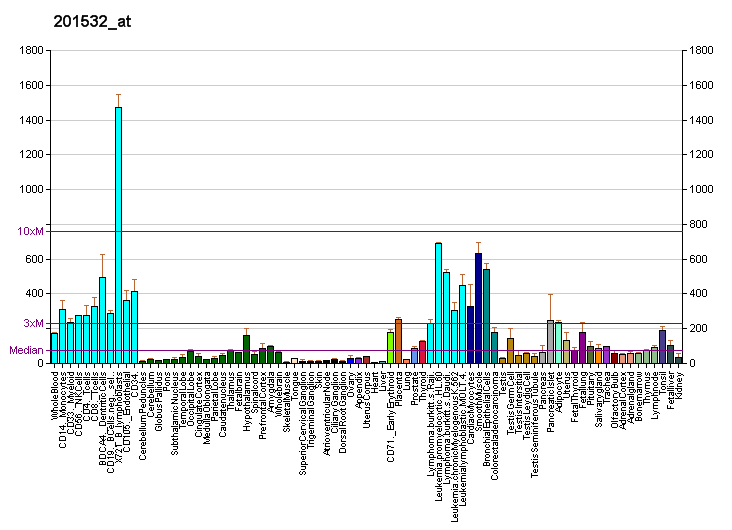
RNA expression pattern
Bgee	Human / Mouse (ortholog); Top expressed in: rectum; right adrenal gland; right adrenal cortex; Achilles tendon; smooth muscle tissue; body of pancreas; left adrenal gland; right lobe of thyroid gland; islet of Langerhans; left lobe of thyroid gland / Top expressed in: right kidney; embryo; embryo; ventricular zone; blastocyst; morula; muscle of thigh; yolk sac; esophagus; spermatocyte; More reference expression data
BioGPS	More reference expression data
Gene ontology
Molecular function	endopeptidase activity; peptidase activity; protein binding; threonine-type endopeptidase activity; hydrolase activity; ubiquitin protein ligase binding
Cellular component	cytoplasm; cytosol; nucleoplasm; proteasome complex; extracellular exosome; nucleus; proteasome core complex; synapse; proteasome core complex, alpha-subunit complex
Biological process	regulation of cellular amino acid metabolic process; antigen processing and presentation of exogenous peptide antigen via MHC class I, TAP-dependent; regulation of mRNA stability; ubiquitin-dependent protein catabolic process; positive regulation of canonical Wnt signaling pathway; protein polyubiquitination; stimulatory C-type lectin receptor signaling pathway; tumor necrosis factor-mediated signaling pathway; proteolysis; MAPK cascade; Fc-epsilon receptor signaling pathway; NIK/NF-kappaB signaling; anaphase-promoting complex-dependent catabolic process; proteolysis involved in cellular protein catabolic process; T cell receptor signaling pathway; negative regulation of canonical Wnt signaling pathway; regulation of endopeptidase activity; viral process; Wnt signaling pathway, planar cell polarity pathway; proteasome-mediated ubiquitin-dependent protein catabolic process; negative regulation of G2/M transition of mitotic cell cycle; protein deubiquitination; SCF-dependent proteasomal ubiquitin-dependent protein catabolic process; transmembrane transport; regulation of transcription from RNA polymerase II promoter in response to hypoxia; post-translational protein modification; regulation of hematopoietic stem cell differentiation; proteasomal protein catabolic process; proteasomal ubiquitin-independent protein catabolic process; interleukin-1-mediated signaling pathway; regulation of mitotic cell cycle phase transition
Sources:Amigo / QuickGO
Orthologs
Databases	NCBI: entry; OMA: entry
Species	Human	Mouse
Entrez	5684	19167
Ensembl	ENSG00000100567	ENSMUSG00000060073
UniProt	P25788	O70435
RefSeq (mRNA)	NM_002788; NM_152132	NM_011184; NM_001310595; NM_001310596
RefSeq (protein)	NP_002779; NP_687033	NP_001297524; NP_001297525; NP_035314
Location (UCSC)	Chr 14: 58.24 – 58.27 Mb	Chr 12: 71.02 – 71.04 Mb
PubMed search
- Wikidata
View/Edit Human	View/Edit Mouse

Proteasome subunit alpha type-3 also known as macropain subunit C8 and proteasome component C8 is a protein that in humans is encoded by the PSMA3 gene. This protein is one of the 17 essential subunits (alpha subunits 1–7, constitutive beta subunits 1–7, and inducible subunits including beta1i, beta2i, beta5i) that contributes to the complete assembly of 20S proteasome complex.

== Function ==
The eukaryotic proteasome recognized degradable proteins, including damaged proteins for protein quality control purpose or key regulatory protein components for dynamic biological processes. An essential function of a modified proteasome, the immunoproteasome, is the processing of class I MHC peptides. As a component of alpha ring, proteasome subunit alpha type-3 contributes to the formation of heptameric alpha rings and substrate entrance gate.

== Structure ==
The human protein proteasome subunit alpha type-3 is 28.4 kDa in size and composed of 254 amino acids. The calculated theoretical pI of this protein is 5.08.

=== Complex assembly ===
The proteasome is a multicatalytic proteinase complex with a highly ordered 20S core structure. This barrel-shaped core structure is composed of 4 axially stacked rings of 28 non-identical subunits: the two end rings are each formed by 7 alpha subunits, and the two central rings are each formed by 7 beta subunits. Three beta subunits (beta1, beta2, and beta5) each contains a proteolytic active site and has distinct substrate preferences. Proteasomes are distributed throughout eukaryotic cells at a high concentration and cleave peptides in an ATP/ubiquitin-dependent process in a non-lysosomal pathway.

== Mechanism ==
Crystal structures of isolated 20S proteasome complex demonstrate that the two rings of beta subunits form a proteolytic chamber and maintain all their active sites of proteolysis within the chamber. Concomitantly, the rings of alpha subunits form the entrance for substrates entering the proteolytic chamber. In an inactivated 20S proteasome complex, the gate into the internal proteolytic chamber are guarded by the N-terminal tails of specific alpha-subunit. The proteolytic capacity of 20S core particle (CP) can be activated when CP associates with one or two regulatory particles (RP) on one or both side of alpha rings. These regulatory particles include 19S proteasome complexes, 11S proteasome complex, etc. Following the CP-RP association, the confirmation of certain alpha subunits will change and consequently cause the opening of substrate entrance gate. Besides RPs, the 20S proteasomes can also be effectively activated by other mild chemical treatments, such as exposure to low levels of sodium dodecylsulfate (SDS) or NP-14.

== Clinical significance ==
The proteasome and its subunits are of clinical significance for at least two reasons: (1) a compromised complex assembly or a dysfunctional proteasome can be associated with the underlying pathophysiology of specific diseases, and (2) they can be exploited as drug targets for therapeutic interventions. More recently, more effort has been made to consider the proteasome for the development of novel diagnostic markers and strategies.

The proteasomes form a pivotal component for the ubiquitin–proteasome system (UPS) and corresponding cellular Protein Quality Control (PQC). Protein ubiquitination and subsequent proteolysis and degradation by the proteasome are important mechanisms in the regulation of the cell cycle, cell growth and differentiation, gene transcription, signal transduction and apoptosis. Subsequently, a compromised proteasome complex assembly and function lead to reduced proteolytic activities and the accumulation of damaged or misfolded protein species. Such protein accumulation may contribute to the pathogenesis and phenotypic characteristics in neurodegenerative diseases, cardiovascular diseases, inflammatory responses and autoimmune diseases, and systemic DNA damage responses leading to malignancies.

Several experimental and clinical studies have indicated that aberrations and deregulations of the UPS contribute to the pathogenesis of several neurodegenerative and myodegenerative disorders, including Alzheimer's disease, Parkinson's disease and Pick's disease, Amyotrophic lateral sclerosis (ALS), Huntington's disease, Creutzfeldt–Jakob disease, and motor neuron diseases, polyglutamine (PolyQ) diseases, Muscular dystrophies and several rare forms of neurodegenerative diseases associated with dementia. As part of the ubiquitin–proteasome system (UPS), the proteasome maintains cardiac protein homeostasis and thus plays a significant role in cardiac ischemic injury, ventricular hypertrophy and heart failure. Additionally, evidence is accumulating that the UPS plays an essential role in malignant transformation. UPS proteolysis plays a major role in responses of cancer cells to stimulatory signals that are critical for the development of cancer. Accordingly, gene expression by degradation of transcription factors, such as p53, c-jun, c-Fos, NF-κB, c-Myc, HIF-1α, MATα2, STAT3, sterol-regulated element-binding proteins and androgen receptors are all controlled by the UPS and thus involved in the development of various malignancies. Moreover, the UPS regulates the degradation of tumor suppressor gene products such as adenomatous polyposis coli (APC) in colorectal cancer, retinoblastoma (Rb). and von Hippel–Lindau tumor suppressor (VHL), as well as a number of proto-oncogenes (Raf, Myc, Myb, Rel, Src, Mos, ABL). The UPS is also involved in the regulation of inflammatory responses. This activity is usually attributed to the role of proteasomes in the activation of NF-κB which further regulates the expression of pro inflammatory cytokines such as TNF-α, IL-β, IL-8, adhesion molecules (ICAM-1, VCAM-1, P-selectin) and prostaglandins and nitric oxide (NO). Additionally, the UPS also plays a role in inflammatory responses as regulators of leukocyte proliferation, mainly through proteolysis of cyclines and the degradation of CDK inhibitors. Lastly, autoimmune disease patients with SLE, Sjögren syndrome and rheumatoid arthritis (RA) predominantly exhibit circulating proteasomes which can be applied as clinical biomarkers.

A role of the proteasome subunit alpha type-3 has been linked in underlying mechanisms of human malignancies. It has been suggested that Cables1 as a novel p21 regulator through maintaining p21 stability and supporting the model that the tumor-suppressive function of Cables1 occurs at least in part through enhancing the tumor-suppressive activity of p21. In this process, Cables 1 mechanistically interferes the proteasome subunit alpha type-3 (PMSA3) hereby binding to p21 to induce cell death and inhibit cell proliferation.

== Interactions ==
PSMA3 has been shown to interact with

- CRYAB,
- PLK1,
- PSMA6, and
- Zif268.
