= PSMD14 =

Protein-coding gene in the species Homo sapiens

Identifiers
- Aliases: PSMD14, PAD1, POH1, RPN11, proteasome 26S subunit, non-ATPase 14
- External IDs: OMIM: 607173; MGI: 1913284; GeneCards: PSMD14
Enzyme activity
EC #	BRENDA	ExPASy	KEGG	MetaCyc
3.4.19.12	↗	↗	↗	↗

Gene location (Human)
Chr.	Chromosome 2 (human)
Band	2q24.2	Start	161,308,425 bp
Band	2q24.2	End	161,411,717 bp

Gene location (Mouse)
Chr.	Chromosome 2 (mouse)
Band	2|2 C1.3	Start	61,542,038 bp
Band	2|2 C1.3	End	61,630,720 bp
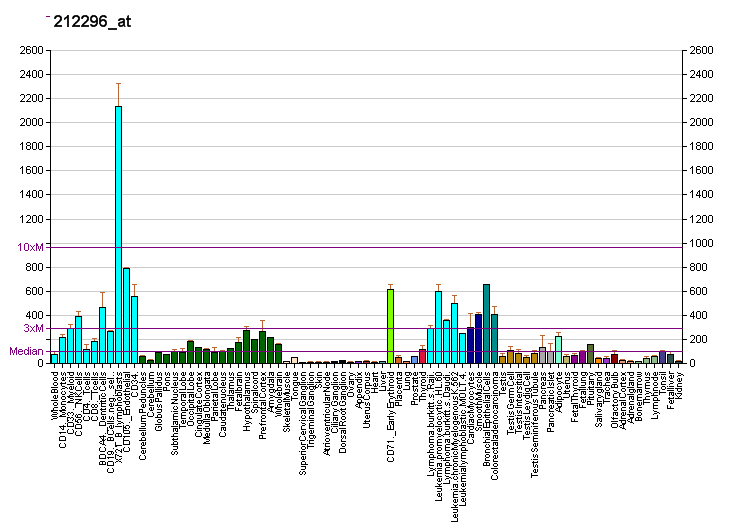
RNA expression pattern
Bgee	Human / Mouse (ortholog); Top expressed in: middle temporal gyrus; endothelial cell; deltoid muscle; glutes; tibialis anterior muscle; triceps brachii muscle; biceps brachii; Skeletal muscle tissue of biceps brachii; Brodmann area 23; gingival epithelium / Top expressed in: endothelial cell of lymphatic vessel; primitive streak; medial ganglionic eminence; facial motor nucleus; hair follicle; renal corpuscle; otic placode; Paneth cell; condyle; vestibular membrane of cochlear duct; More reference expression data
BioGPS	More reference expression data
Gene ontology
Molecular function	metal ion binding; endopeptidase activator activity; proteasome binding; peptidase activity; protein binding; hydrolase activity; metallopeptidase activity; thiol-dependent deubiquitinase; Lys63-specific deubiquitinase activity
Cellular component	cytosol; proteasome accessory complex; nucleoplasm; cytosolic proteasome complex; proteasome regulatory particle, lid subcomplex; proteasome complex; extracellular exosome; nucleus; extracellular region; secretory granule lumen; ficolin-1-rich granule lumen
Biological process	regulation of proteasomal protein catabolic process; regulation of cellular amino acid metabolic process; antigen processing and presentation of exogenous peptide antigen via MHC class I, TAP-dependent; ubiquitin-dependent protein catabolic process; regulation of mRNA stability; positive regulation of canonical Wnt signaling pathway; protein polyubiquitination; stimulatory C-type lectin receptor signaling pathway; tumor necrosis factor-mediated signaling pathway; MAPK cascade; proteolysis; cellular response to DNA damage stimulus; Fc-epsilon receptor signaling pathway; protein K63-linked deubiquitination; NIK/NF-kappaB signaling; double-strand break repair via homologous recombination; anaphase-promoting complex-dependent catabolic process; response to ethanol; double-strand break repair via nonhomologous end joining; T cell receptor signaling pathway; negative regulation of canonical Wnt signaling pathway; DNA repair; positive regulation of endopeptidase activity; Wnt signaling pathway, planar cell polarity pathway; proteasome-mediated ubiquitin-dependent protein catabolic process; negative regulation of G2/M transition of mitotic cell cycle; protein deubiquitination; SCF-dependent proteasomal ubiquitin-dependent protein catabolic process; neutrophil degranulation; transmembrane transport; regulation of transcription from RNA polymerase II promoter in response to hypoxia; post-translational protein modification; regulation of hematopoietic stem cell differentiation; interleukin-1-mediated signaling pathway; regulation of mitotic cell cycle phase transition
Sources:Amigo / QuickGO
Orthologs
Databases	NCBI: entry; OMA: entry
Species	Human	Mouse
Entrez	10213	59029
Ensembl	ENSG00000115233	ENSMUSG00000026914
UniProt	O00487	O35593
RefSeq (mRNA)	NM_005805	NM_021526
RefSeq (protein)	NP_005796	NP_067501
Location (UCSC)	Chr 2: 161.31 – 161.41 Mb	Chr 2: 61.54 – 61.63 Mb
PubMed search
- Wikidata
View/Edit Human	View/Edit Mouse

26S proteasome non-ATPase regulatory subunit 14, also known as 26S proteasome non-ATPase subunit Rpn11, is an enzyme that in humans is encoded by the PSMD14 gene. This protein is one of the 19 essential subunits of the complete assembled 19S proteasome complex. Nine subunits Rpn3, Rpn5, Rpn6, Rpn7, Rpn8, Rpn9, Rpn11, SEM1 (yeast analogue for human protein DSS1), and Rpn12 form the lid sub complex of the 19S regulatory particle of the proteasome complex.

== Gene ==
The gene PSMD14 encodes one of 26S proteasome non-ATPase subunit. The human gene PSMD14 has 12 Exons and locates at chromosome band 2q24.2.

== Protein ==
The human protein 26S proteasome non-ATPase regulatory subunit 14 is 34.6 kDa in size and composed of 310 amino acids. The calculated theoretical pI of this protein is 6.06.

== Complex assembly ==
The 26S proteasome complex usually consists of a 20S core particle (CP, or 20S proteasome) and one or two 19S regulatory particles (RP, or 19S proteasome) on either or both sides of the barrel-shaped 20S subunit. The CP and RPs have distinct structural characteristics and biological functions. Briefly, the 20S subunit has three types of proteolytic activity, including caspase-like, trypsin-like, and chymotrypsin-like activities. These proteolytic active sites are located in the inner side of a chamber formed by 4 stacked rings of 20S subunits, preventing random protein-enzyme encounter and uncontrolled protein degradation. The 19S regulatory particles can recognize ubiquitin-labeled protein as a substrate for degradation, unfold the protein to a linear molecule, open the "gates" of the 20S core particle, and guide the substrate into the proteolytic chamber. To achieve such functional complexity, the 19S regulatory particle contains at least 18 constitutive subunits. These subunits can be categorized into two classes based on their ATP dependence, with both ATP-dependent subunits and ATP-independent subunits. According to the protein interaction and topological characteristics of this multisubunit complex, the 19S regulatory particle is composed of a base and a lid subcomplex. The base consists of a ring of six AAA ATPases (Subunit Rpt1-6, systematic nomenclature) and four non-ATPase subunits (Rpn1, Rpn2, Rpn10, and Rpn13). The lid sub-complex of the 19S regulatory particle consists of 9 subunits. The assembly of the 19S lid is independent of the assembly process of the 19S base. The two assembly modules, the Rpn5-Rpn6-Rpn8-Rpn9-Rpn11 module and the Rpn3-Rpn7-SEM1 module were identified as playing a role in 19S lid assembly by using the yeast proteasome as a model complex. The subunit Rpn12 incorporated into 19S regulatory particle when 19S lid and base bind together. Among these lid subunits, protein Rpn11 presents the metalloproteases activity to hydrolyze the ubiquitin molecules from the poly-ubiquitin chain before protein substrates are unfolded and degraded. During substrate degradation, the 19S regulatory particles undergo a conformation switch that is characterized by a rearranged ATPase ring with uniform subunit interfaces. Notably, Rpn11 migrates from an occluded position to directly above the central pore, thus facilitating substrate deubiquitination concomitant with translocation.

== Function ==
As the degradation machinery that is responsible for ~70% of intracellular proteolysis, the proteasome complex (26S proteasome) plays critical roles in maintaining the homeostasis of the cellular proteome. Misfolded proteins and damaged protein need to be continuously removed to recycle amino acids for new synthesis; in addition, some key regulatory proteins fulfil their biological functions via selective degradation; furthermore, proteins are digested into peptides for MHC class I antigen presentation. To meet such complicated demands in biological processes via spatial and temporal proteolysis, protein substrates have to be recognized, recruited, and eventually hydrolyzed in a controlled fashion. Thus, the 19S regulatory particle has a series of important capabilities to address these functional challenges. To recognize proteins as designated substrates, the 19S complex has subunits that are capable of recognizing proteins with a special degradative tag, ubiquitination. It also has subunits that can bind to nucleotides (e.g., ATPs) in order to facilitate the association between the 19S and 20S particles, as well as to cause conformational changes to the alpha subunit C-terminals that form the substrate entrance of the 20S complex. Rpn11 drives metalloprotease activity to hydrolyze the ubiquitin molecules from the poly-ubiquitin chain before protein substrates are unfolded and degraded

== Clinical significance ==
The proteasome and its subunits are of clinical significance for at least two reasons: (1) a compromised complex assembly or a dysfunctional proteasome can be associated with the underlying pathophysiology of specific diseases, and (2) they can be exploited as drug targets for therapeutic interventions. More recently, the proteasome has been considered for the development of novel diagnostic markers and strategies. An improved and comprehensive understanding of the pathophysiology of the proteasome should lead to clinical applications in the future.

The proteasomes form a pivotal component of the Ubiquitin-Proteasome System (UPS) and corresponding cellular Protein Quality Control (PQC). Protein ubiquitination and subsequent proteolysis and degradation by the proteasome are important mechanisms in the regulation of the cell cycle, cell growth and differentiation, gene transcription, signal transduction and apoptosis. Subsequently, a compromised proteasome complex assembly and function lead to reduced proteolytic activities and the accumulation of damaged or misfolded protein species. Such protein accumulation may contribute to the pathogenesis and phenotypic characteristics in neurodegenerative diseases, cardiovascular diseases, inflammatory responses and autoimmune diseases, and systemic DNA damage responses leading to malignancies.

Several experimental and clinical studies have indicated that aberrations and deregulations of the UPS contribute to the pathogenesis of several neurodegenerative and myodegenerative disorders, including Alzheimer's disease, Parkinson's disease and Pick's disease, Amyotrophic lateral sclerosis (ALS), Huntington's disease, Creutzfeldt–Jakob disease, and motor neuron diseases, polyglutamine (PolyQ) diseases, Muscular dystrophies and several rare forms of neurodegenerative diseases associated with dementia. As part of the Ubiquitin-Proteasome System (UPS), the proteasome maintains cardiac protein homeostasis and thus plays a significant role in cardiac Ischemic injury, ventricular hypertrophy and Heart failure. Additionally, evidence is accumulating that the UPS plays an essential role in malignant transformation. UPS proteolysis plays a major role in responses of cancer cells to stimulatory signals that are critical for the development of cancer. Accordingly, gene expression by degradation of transcription factors, such as p53, c-jun, c-Fos, NF-κB, c-Myc, HIF-1α, MATα2, STAT3, sterol-regulated element-binding proteins and androgen receptors are all controlled by the UPS and thus involved in the development of various malignancies. Moreover, the UPS regulates the degradation of tumor suppressor gene products such as adenomatous polyposis coli (APC) in colorectal cancer, retinoblastoma (Rb). and von Hippel–Lindau tumor suppressor (VHL), as well as a number of proto-oncogenes (Raf, Myc, Myb, Rel, Src, Mos, Abl). The UPS is also involved in the regulation of inflammatory responses. This activity is usually attributed to the role of proteasomes in the activation of NF-κB which further regulates the expression of pro inflammatory cytokines such as TNF-α, IL-β, IL-8, adhesion molecules (ICAM-1, VCAM-1, P-selectin) and prostaglandins and nitric oxide (NO). Additionally, the UPS also plays a role in inflammatory responses as regulators of leukocyte proliferation, mainly through proteolysis of cyclines and the degradation of CDK inhibitors. Lastly, autoimmune disease patients with SLE, Sjögren syndrome and rheumatoid arthritis (RA) predominantly exhibit circulating proteasomes which can be applied as clinical biomarkers.
