= PSMD6 =

Enzyme found in humans

Identifiers
- Aliases: PSMD6, Rpn7, S10, SGA-113M, p42A, p44S10, proteasome 26S subunit, non-ATPase 6
- External IDs: OMIM: 617857; MGI: 1913663; GeneCards: PSMD6

Gene location (Mouse)
Chr.	Chromosome 14 (mouse)
Band	14|14 A1	Start	8,348,779 bp
Band	14|14 A1	End	8,357,589 bp
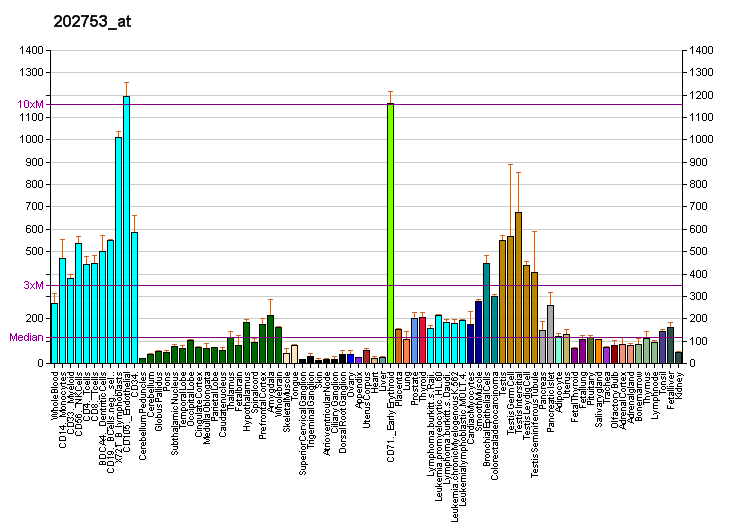
RNA expression pattern
Bgee	Human / Mouse (ortholog); Top expressed in: body of pancreas; sperm; tibialis anterior muscle; gastrocnemius muscle; islet of Langerhans; deltoid muscle; Achilles tendon; right adrenal gland; triceps brachii muscle; left adrenal gland / Top expressed in: otic placode; saccule; abdominal wall; external carotid artery; intercostal muscle; internal carotid artery; medial ganglionic eminence; somite; otic vesicle; vas deferens; More reference expression data
BioGPS	More reference expression data
Gene ontology
Molecular function	ATPase activity; protein binding; enzyme regulator activity
Cellular component	cytosol; proteasome accessory complex; proteasome regulatory particle; nucleoplasm; proteasome complex; extracellular region; secretory granule lumen; ficolin-1-rich granule lumen
Biological process	proteolysis; protein deubiquitination; neutrophil degranulation; post-translational protein modification; regulation of catalytic activity; proteasome-mediated ubiquitin-dependent protein catabolic process; MAPK cascade; protein polyubiquitination; stimulatory C-type lectin receptor signaling pathway; antigen processing and presentation of exogenous peptide antigen via MHC class I, TAP-dependent; regulation of cellular amino acid metabolic process; negative regulation of G2/M transition of mitotic cell cycle; anaphase-promoting complex-dependent catabolic process; SCF-dependent proteasomal ubiquitin-dependent protein catabolic process; tumor necrosis factor-mediated signaling pathway; NIK/NF-kappaB signaling; Fc-epsilon receptor signaling pathway; regulation of mRNA stability; T cell receptor signaling pathway; transmembrane transport; Wnt signaling pathway, planar cell polarity pathway; regulation of transcription from RNA polymerase II promoter in response to hypoxia; interleukin-1-mediated signaling pathway; negative regulation of canonical Wnt signaling pathway; positive regulation of canonical Wnt signaling pathway; regulation of mitotic cell cycle phase transition; regulation of hematopoietic stem cell differentiation
Sources:Amigo / QuickGO
Orthologs
Databases	NCBI: entry
Species	Human	Mouse
Entrez	9861	66413
Ensembl	n/a	ENSMUSG00000021737
UniProt	Q15008	Q99JI4
RefSeq (mRNA)	NM_001271779; NM_001271780; NM_001271781; NM_014814	NM_025550
RefSeq (protein)	NP_001258708; NP_001258709; NP_001258710; NP_055629	NP_079826
Location (UCSC)	n/a	Chr 14: 8.35 – 8.36 Mb
PubMed search
- Wikidata
View/Edit Human	View/Edit Mouse

26S proteasome non-ATPase regulatory subunit 6 is an enzyme that in humans is encoded by the PSMD6 gene.

== Clinical significance ==
The proteasome and its subunits are of clinical significance for at least two reasons: (1) a compromised complex assembly or a dysfunctional proteasome can be associated with the underlying pathophysiology of specific diseases, and (2) they can be exploited as drug targets for therapeutic interventions. More recently, more effort has been made to consider the proteasome for the development of novel diagnostic markers and strategies. An improved and comprehensive understanding of the pathophysiology of the proteasome should lead to clinical applications in the future.

The proteasomes form a pivotal component for the Ubiquitin-Proteasome System (UPS) and corresponding cellular Protein Quality Control (PQC). Protein ubiquitination and subsequent proteolysis and degradation by the proteasome are important mechanisms in the regulation of the cell cycle, cell growth and differentiation, gene transcription, signal transduction and apoptosis. Subsequently, a compromised proteasome complex assembly and function lead to reduced proteolytic activities and the accumulation of damaged or misfolded protein species. Such protein accumulation may contribute to the pathogenesis and phenotypic characteristics in neurodegenerative diseases, cardiovascular diseases, inflammatory responses and autoimmune diseases, and systemic DNA damage responses leading to malignancies.

Several experimental and clinical studies have indicated that aberrations and deregulations of the UPS contribute to the pathogenesis of several neurodegenerative and myodegenerative disorders, including Alzheimer's disease, Parkinson's disease and Pick's disease, Amyotrophic lateral sclerosis (ALS), Huntington's disease, Creutzfeldt–Jakob disease, and motor neuron diseases, polyglutamine (PolyQ) diseases, Muscular dystrophies and several rare forms of neurodegenerative diseases associated with dementia. As part of the Ubiquitin-Proteasome System (UPS), the proteasome maintains cardiac protein homeostasis and thus plays a significant role in cardiac Ischemic injury, ventricular hypertrophy and Heart failure. Additionally, evidence is accumulating that the UPS plays an essential role in malignant transformation. UPS proteolysis plays a major role in responses of cancer cells to stimulatory signals that are critical for the development of cancer. Accordingly, gene expression by degradation of transcription factors, such as p53, c-jun, c-Fos, NF-κB, c-Myc, HIF-1α, MATα2, STAT3, sterol-regulated element-binding proteins and androgen receptors are all controlled by the UPS and thus involved in the development of various malignancies. Moreover, the UPS regulates the degradation of tumor suppressor gene products such as adenomatous polyposis coli (APC) in colorectal cancer, retinoblastoma (Rb). and von Hippel–Lindau tumor suppressor (VHL), as well as a number of proto-oncogenes (Raf, Myc, Myb, Rel, Src, Mos, ABL). The UPS is also involved in the regulation of inflammatory responses. This activity is usually attributed to the role of proteasomes in the activation of NF-κB which further regulates the expression of pro inflammatory cytokines such as TNF-α, IL-β, IL-8, adhesion molecules (ICAM-1, VCAM-1, P-selectin) and prostaglandins and nitric oxide (NO). Additionally, the UPS also plays a role in inflammatory responses as regulators of leukocyte proliferation, mainly through proteolysis of cyclines and the degradation of CDK inhibitors. Lastly, autoimmune disease patients with SLE, Sjögren syndrome and rheumatoid arthritis (RA) predominantly exhibit circulating proteasomes which can be applied as clinical biomarkers.

During the antigen processing for the major histocompatibility complex (MHC) class-I, the proteasome is the major degradation machinery that degrades the antigen and present the resulting peptides to cytotoxic T lymphocytes. The immunoproteasome has been considered playing a critical role in improving the quality and quantity of generated class-I ligands.

== Interactions ==
PSMD6 has been shown to interact with PSMD13.
