= PSMD3 =

Enzyme found in humans

Identifiers
- Aliases: PSMD3, P58, RPN3, S3, TSTA2, proteasome 26S subunit, non-ATPase 3
- External IDs: OMIM: 617676; MGI: 98858; GeneCards: PSMD3

Gene location (Human)
Chr.	Chromosome 17 (human)
Band	17q21.1	Start	39,980,807 bp
Band	17q21.1	End	39,997,959 bp

Gene location (Mouse)
Chr.	Chromosome 11 (mouse)
Band	11 D|11 62.39 cM	Start	98,573,380 bp
Band	11 D|11 62.39 cM	End	98,586,805 bp
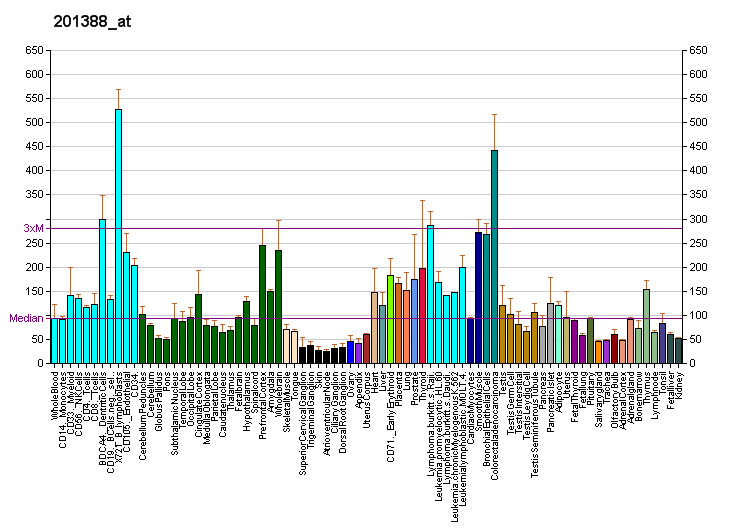
RNA expression pattern
Bgee	Human / Mouse (ortholog); Top expressed in: gastrocnemius muscle; muscle of thigh; skin of leg; mucosa of transverse colon; skin of abdomen; right hemisphere of cerebellum; stromal cell of endometrium; ganglionic eminence; body of uterus; gastric mucosa / Top expressed in: muscle of thigh; lip; yolk sac; right kidney; ventricular zone; proximal tubule; epiblast; superior frontal gyrus; primary visual cortex; perirhinal cortex; More reference expression data
BioGPS	More reference expression data
Gene ontology
Molecular function	enzyme regulator activity; protein binding
Cellular component	cytosol; membrane; proteasome accessory complex; proteasome regulatory particle; proteasome regulatory particle, lid subcomplex; proteasome complex; extracellular exosome; nucleus; extracellular region; nucleoplasm; secretory granule lumen; ficolin-1-rich granule lumen
Biological process	regulation of cellular amino acid metabolic process; antigen processing and presentation of exogenous peptide antigen via MHC class I, TAP-dependent; ubiquitin-dependent protein catabolic process; regulation of mRNA stability; positive regulation of canonical Wnt signaling pathway; protein polyubiquitination; stimulatory C-type lectin receptor signaling pathway; tumor necrosis factor-mediated signaling pathway; MAPK cascade; Fc-epsilon receptor signaling pathway; NIK/NF-kappaB signaling; regulation of protein catabolic process; anaphase-promoting complex-dependent catabolic process; T cell receptor signaling pathway; negative regulation of canonical Wnt signaling pathway; Wnt signaling pathway, planar cell polarity pathway; proteasome-mediated ubiquitin-dependent protein catabolic process; negative regulation of G2/M transition of mitotic cell cycle; protein deubiquitination; SCF-dependent proteasomal ubiquitin-dependent protein catabolic process; neutrophil degranulation; transmembrane transport; regulation of transcription from RNA polymerase II promoter in response to hypoxia; post-translational protein modification; regulation of hematopoietic stem cell differentiation; regulation of catalytic activity; interleukin-1-mediated signaling pathway; regulation of mitotic cell cycle phase transition
Sources:Amigo / QuickGO
Orthologs
Databases	NCBI: entry; OMA: entry
Species	Human	Mouse
Entrez	5709	22123
Ensembl	ENSG00000108344	ENSMUSG00000017221
UniProt	O43242	P14685
RefSeq (mRNA)	NM_002809	NM_009439
RefSeq (protein)	NP_002800	NP_033465
Location (UCSC)	Chr 17: 39.98 – 40 Mb	Chr 11: 98.57 – 98.59 Mb
PubMed search
- Wikidata
View/Edit Human	View/Edit Mouse

26S proteasome non-ATPase regulatory subunit 3 is an enzyme that in humans is encoded by the PSMD3 gene.

== Function ==
The 26S proteasome is a multicatalytic proteinase complex with a highly ordered structure composed of 2 complexes, a 20S core and a 19S regulator. The 20S core is composed of 4 rings of 28 non-identical subunits; 2 rings are composed of 7 alpha subunits and 2 rings are composed of 7 beta subunits. The 19S regulator is composed of a base, which contains 6 ATPase subunits and 2 non-ATPase subunits, and a lid, which contains up to 10 non-ATPase subunits. Proteasomes are distributed throughout eukaryotic cells at a high concentration and cleave peptides in an ATP/ubiquitin-dependent process in a non-lysosomal pathway. An essential function of a modified proteasome, the immunoproteasome, is the processing of class I MHC peptides. This gene encodes one of the non-ATPase subunits of the 19S regulator lid.

== Clinical significance ==
The proteasomes form a pivotal component for the Ubiquitin-Proteasome System (UPS) and corresponding cellular Protein Quality Control (PQC). Protein ubiquitination and subsequent proteolysis and degradation by the proteasome are important mechanisms in the regulation of the cell cycle, cell growth and differentiation, gene transcription, signal transduction and apoptosis. Subsequently, a compromised proteasome complex assembly and function lead to reduced proteolytic activities and the accumulation of damaged or misfolded protein species. Such protein accumulation may contribute to the pathogenesis and phenotypic characteristics in neurodegenerative diseases, cardiovascular diseases, inflammatory responses and autoimmune diseases, and systemic DNA damage responses leading to malignancies.

Several experimental and clinical studies have indicated that aberrations and deregulations of the UPS contribute to the pathogenesis of several neurodegenerative and myodegenerative disorders, including Alzheimer's disease, Parkinson's disease and Pick's disease, Amyotrophic lateral sclerosis (ALS), Huntington's disease, Creutzfeldt–Jakob disease, and motor neuron diseases, polyglutamine (PolyQ) diseases, Muscular dystrophies and several rare forms of neurodegenerative diseases associated with dementia. As part of the Ubiquitin-Proteasome System (UPS), the proteasome maintains cardiac protein homeostasis and thus plays a significant role in cardiac Ischemic injury, ventricular hypertrophy and Heart failure. Additionally, evidence is accumulating that the UPS plays an essential role in malignant transformation. UPS proteolysis plays a major role in responses of cancer cells to stimulatory signals that are critical for the development of cancer. Accordingly, gene expression by degradation of transcription factors, such as p53, c-jun, c-Fos, NF-κB, c-Myc, HIF-1α, MATα2, STAT3, sterol-regulated element-binding proteins and androgen receptors are all controlled by the UPS and thus involved in the development of various malignancies. Moreover, the UPS regulates the degradation of tumor suppressor gene products such as adenomatous polyposis coli (APC) in colorectal cancer, retinoblastoma (Rb). and von Hippel–Lindau tumor suppressor (VHL), as well as a number of proto-oncogenes (Raf, Myc, Myb, Rel, Src, Mos, Abl). The UPS is also involved in the regulation of inflammatory responses. This activity is usually attributed to the role of proteasomes in the activation of NF-κB which further regulates the expression of pro inflammatory cytokines such as TNF-α, IL-β, IL-8, adhesion molecules (ICAM-1, VCAM-1, P-selectin) and prostaglandins and nitric oxide (NO). Additionally, the UPS also plays a role in inflammatory responses as regulators of leukocyte proliferation, mainly through proteolysis of cyclines and the degradation of CDK inhibitors. Lastly, autoimmune disease patients with SLE, Sjögren syndrome and rheumatoid arthritis (RA) predominantly exhibit circulating proteasomes which can be applied as clinical biomarkers.

Specifically, genetic variants studies at PSMD3 indicated that its involvement in the regulation of insulin signal transduction could be effected by dietary factors. Accordingly, PSMD3 variants appear to be associated with insulin resistance in populations of different ancestries and these relationships can be affected by eating habits. Furthermore, a genome-wide association study (GWAS) has identified that a variant in PSMD3 is associated to neutropenia induced interferon during the therapy of chronic hepatitis C.

During the antigen processing for the major histocompatibility complex (MHC) class-I, the proteasome is the major degradation machinery that degrades the antigen and present the resulting peptides to cytotoxic T lymphocytes. The immunoproteasome has been considered playing a critical role in improving the quality and quantity of generated class-I ligands.
