= ARHGEF4 =

Protein-coding gene in humans

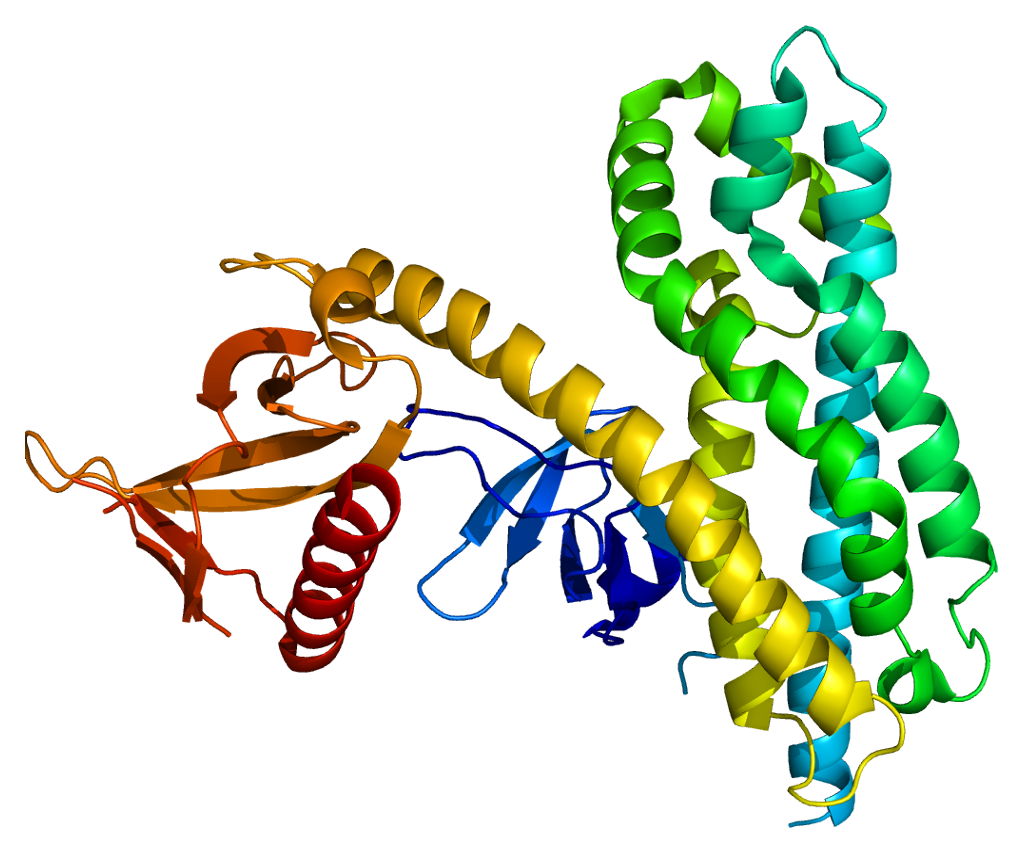

Identifiers
- Aliases: ARHGEF4, ASEF, ASEF1, GEF4, STM6, Rho guanine nucleotide exchange factor 4, SMIM39
- External IDs: OMIM: 605216; MGI: 2442507; GeneCards: ARHGEF4
Available structures
PDB	Ortholog search: PDBe RCSB
PDB	List of PDB id codes 2DX1, 2PZ1, 3NMX, 3NMZ

Gene location (Human)
Chr.	Chromosome 2 (human)
Band	2q21.1	Start	130,836,914 bp
Band	2q21.1	End	131,047,263 bp

Gene location (Mouse)
Chr.	Chromosome 1 (mouse)
Band	1|1 B	Start	34,678,188 bp
Band	1|1 B	End	34,813,309 bp
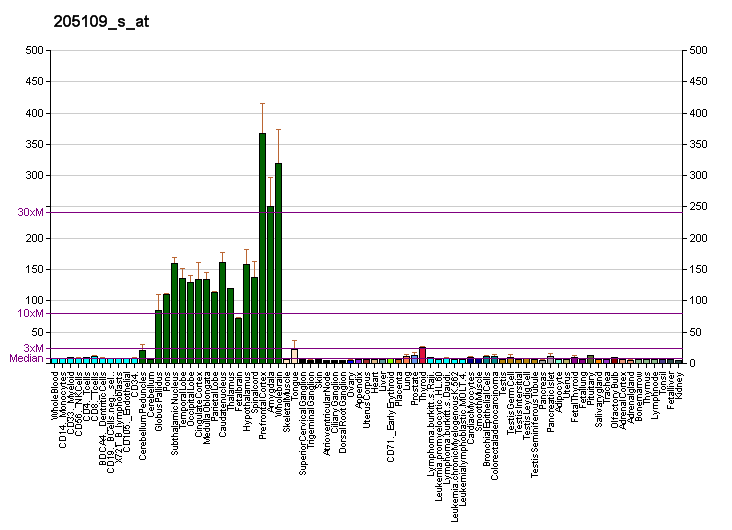

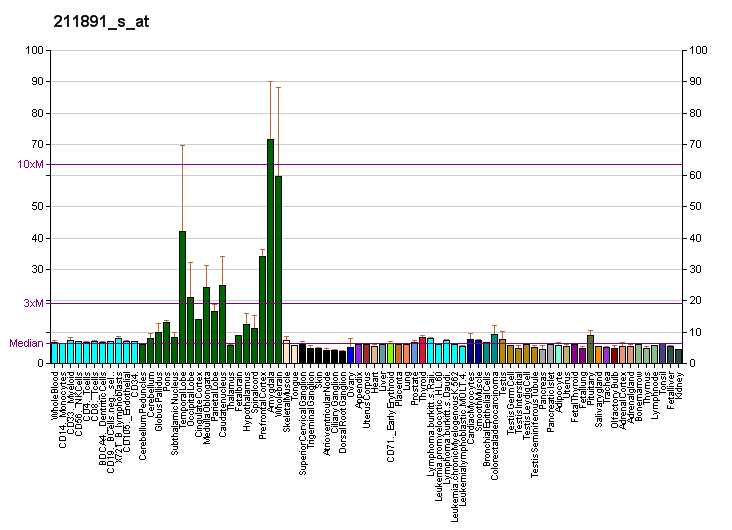
RNA expression pattern
Bgee	Human / Mouse (ortholog); Top expressed in: right frontal lobe; nucleus accumbens; prefrontal cortex; Brodmann area 9; cingulate gyrus; anterior cingulate cortex; amygdala; putamen; caudate nucleus; Brodmann area 10 / Top expressed in: central gray substance of midbrain; pontine nuclei; dorsal tegmental nucleus; anterior horn of spinal cord; medial vestibular nucleus; superior colliculus; hippocampus proper; dentate gyrus; facial motor nucleus; nucleus of stria terminalis; More reference expression data
BioGPS	More reference expression data
Gene ontology
Molecular function	protein binding; protein domain specific binding; guanyl-nucleotide exchange factor activity
Cellular component	cytoplasm; ruffle membrane; cytosol; plasma membrane; cell projection; membrane
Biological process	filopodium assembly; regulation of Rho protein signal transduction; intracellular signal transduction; regulation of small GTPase mediated signal transduction; lamellipodium assembly; positive regulation of apoptotic process; G protein-coupled receptor signaling pathway
Sources:Amigo / QuickGO
Orthologs
Databases	NCBI: entry; OMA: entry
Species	Human	Mouse
Entrez	50649	226970
Ensembl	ENSG00000136002	ENSMUSG00000037509
UniProt	Q9NR80	Q7TNR9
RefSeq (mRNA)	NM_015320; NM_032995; NM_001367493; NM_001375900; NM_001375901 NM_001375902; NM_001375903; NM_001375904; NM_001395416	NM_183019; NM_001368773
RefSeq (protein)	NP_056135; NP_001354422; NP_001362829; NP_001362830; NP_001362831 NP_001362832; NP_001362833	NP_898840; NP_001355702
Location (UCSC)	Chr 2: 130.84 – 131.05 Mb	Chr 1: 34.68 – 34.81 Mb
PubMed search
- Wikidata
View/Edit Human	View/Edit Mouse

Rho guanine nucleotide exchange factor 4 is a protein that in humans is encoded by the ARHGEF4 gene.

== Function ==
Rho GTPases play a fundamental role in numerous cellular processes that are initiated by extracellular stimuli that work through G protein-coupled receptors. The encoded protein may form complex with G proteins and stimulate Rho-dependent signals. This protein is similar to rat collybistin protein. Alternative splicing of this gene generates two transcript variants that encode different isoforms. Also, there is possibility for the usage of multiple polyadenylation sites for this gene.

== Interactions ==
ARHGEF4 has been shown to interact with APC.
