= MAPRE2 =

Protein-coding gene in the species Homo sapiens

Identifiers
- Aliases: MAPRE2, EB1, EB2, RP1, CSCSC2, microtubule associated protein RP/EB family member 2
- External IDs: OMIM: 605789; MGI: 106271; GeneCards: MAPRE2

Gene location (Human)
Chr.	Chromosome 18 (human)
Band	18q12.1-q12.2	Start	34,976,928 bp
Band	18q12.1-q12.2	End	35,143,470 bp

Gene location (Mouse)
Chr.	Chromosome 18 (mouse)
Band	18 A2|18 12.08 cM	Start	23,885,390 bp
Band	18 A2|18 12.08 cM	End	24,026,918 bp
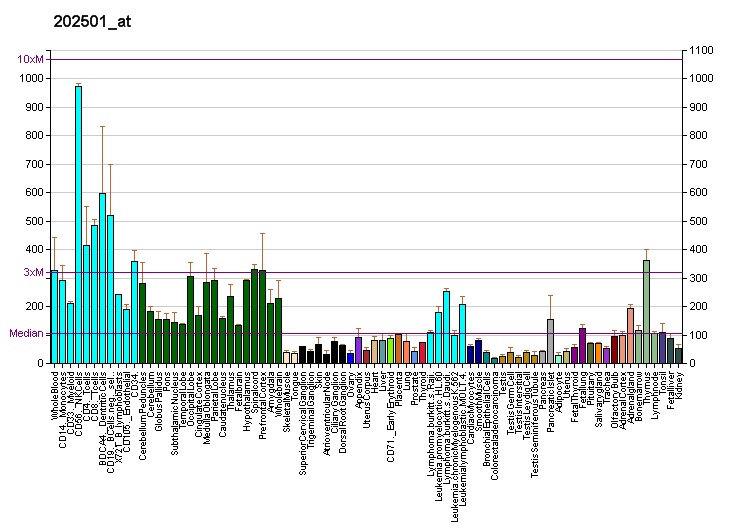

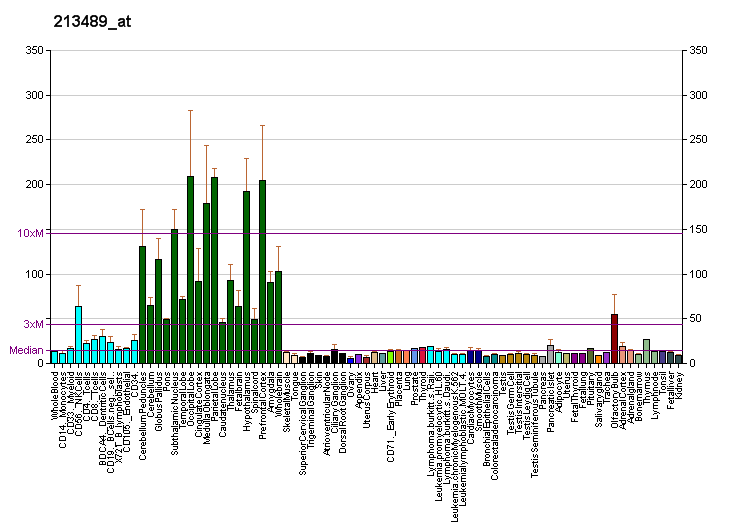
RNA expression pattern
Bgee	Human / Mouse (ortholog); Top expressed in: spinal ganglia; corpus callosum; inferior ganglion of vagus nerve; C1 segment; parietal lobe; prefrontal cortex; subthalamic nucleus; postcentral gyrus; entorhinal cortex; pons / Top expressed in: Rostral migratory stream; nucleus accumbens; motor neuron; ciliary body; barrel cortex; iris; substantia nigra; retinal pigment epithelium; dorsal striatum; external carotid artery; More reference expression data
BioGPS	More reference expression data
Gene ontology
Molecular function	microtubule binding; protein binding; identical protein binding; protein kinase binding; microtubule plus-end binding
Cellular component	microtubule cytoskeleton; microtubule plus-end; microtubule; cytoskeleton; cytoplasm; microtubule organizing center; cytoplasmic microtubule; focal adhesion; spindle midzone
Biological process	cell cycle; cell population proliferation; signal transduction; cell division; regulation of microtubule polymerization or depolymerization; positive regulation of ARF protein signal transduction; protein localization to microtubule; positive regulation of GTPase activity; spindle assembly; positive regulation of keratinocyte migration; positive regulation of adherens junction organization; protein localization to microtubule plus-end
Sources:Amigo / QuickGO
Orthologs
Databases	NCBI: entry; OMA: entry
Species	Human	Mouse
Entrez	10982	212307
Ensembl	ENSG00000166974	ENSMUSG00000024277
UniProt	Q15555	Q8R001
RefSeq (mRNA)	NM_001143826; NM_001143827; NM_001256420; NM_014268	NM_001162941; NM_001162942; NM_153058
RefSeq (protein)	NP_001137298; NP_001137299; NP_001243349; NP_055083	NP_001156413; NP_001156414; NP_694698
Location (UCSC)	Chr 18: 34.98 – 35.14 Mb	Chr 18: 23.89 – 24.03 Mb
PubMed search
- Wikidata
View/Edit Human	View/Edit Mouse

Microtubule-associated protein RP/EB family member 2 is a protein that in humans is encoded by the MAPRE2 gene.

== Function ==
The protein encoded by this gene shares significant homology to the adenomatous polyposis coli (APC) protein-binding EB1 gene family. The function of this protein is unknown; however, its homology suggests involvement in tumorigenesis of colorectal cancers and proliferative control of normal cells. This gene may belong to the intermediate/early gene family, involved in the signal transduction cascade downstream of the TCR.

== Interactions ==
MAPRE2 has been shown to interact with APC.
