= TCF7 =

Protein-coding gene in the species Homo sapiens

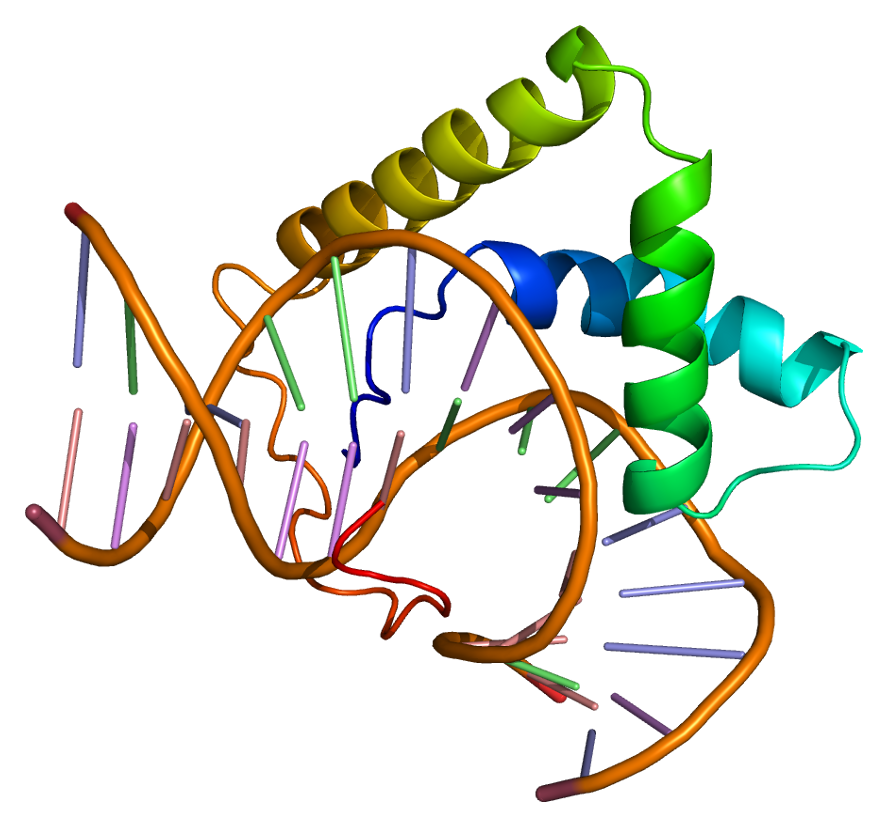

Identifiers
- Aliases: TCF7, TCF-1, transcription factor 7 (T-cell specific, HMG-box), transcription factor 7
- External IDs: OMIM: 189908; MGI: 98507; GeneCards: TCF7

Gene location (Human)
Chr.	Chromosome 5 (human)
Band	5q31.1	Start	134,114,681 bp
Band	5q31.1	End	134,151,865 bp

Gene location (Mouse)
Chr.	Chromosome 11 (mouse)
Band	11 B1.3|11 31.86 cM	Start	52,252,371 bp
Band	11 B1.3|11 31.86 cM	End	52,283,014 bp
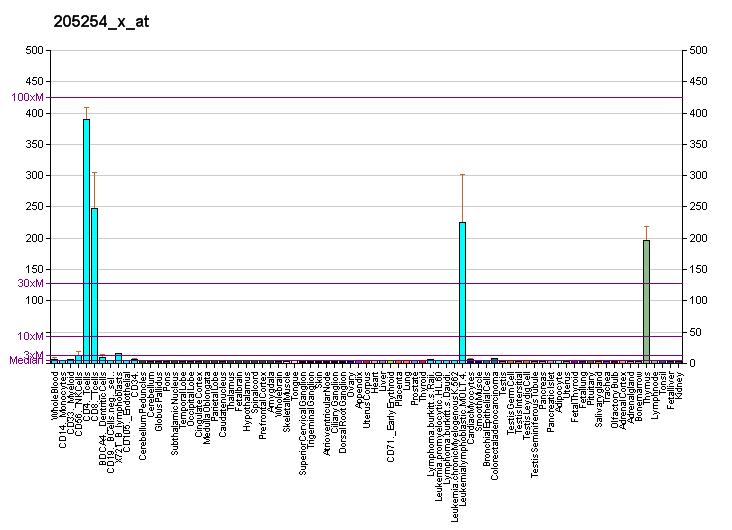

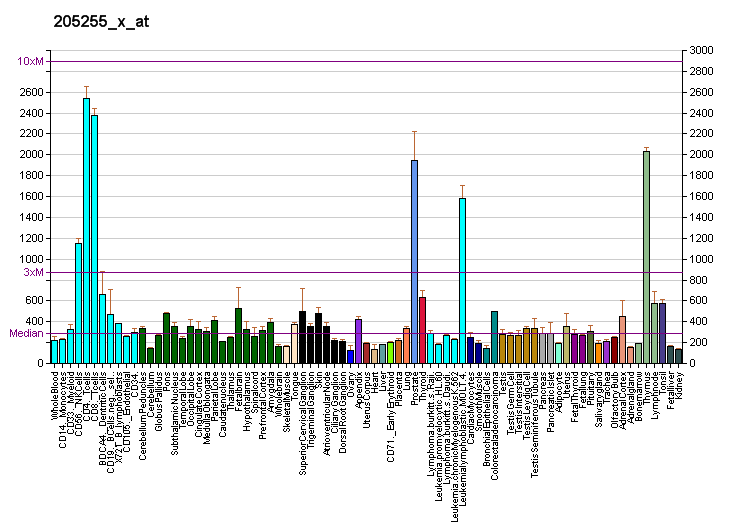
RNA expression pattern
Bgee	Human / Mouse (ortholog); Top expressed in: thymus; periodontal fiber; lymph node; right uterine tube; granulocyte; cecum; appendix; blood; cardia; buccal mucosa cell / Top expressed in: thymus; mesenteric lymph nodes; tail of embryo; zygote; blood; labioscrotal swelling; secondary oocyte; molar; epiblast; spleen; More reference expression data
BioGPS	More reference expression data
Gene ontology
Molecular function	sequence-specific DNA binding; DNA binding; DNA-binding transcription factor activity; protein binding; DNA-binding transcription repressor activity, RNA polymerase II-specific; beta-catenin binding; RNA polymerase II cis-regulatory region sequence-specific DNA binding; DNA-binding transcription factor activity, RNA polymerase II-specific
Cellular component	transcription regulator complex; nucleus; nucleoplasm; nuclear body
Biological process	cellular response to interleukin-4; regulation of transcription, DNA-templated; T cell receptor V(D)J recombination; negative regulation of transcription by RNA polymerase II; embryonic hindgut morphogenesis; Wnt signaling pathway; transcription, DNA-templated; canonical Wnt signaling pathway involved in negative regulation of apoptotic process; embryonic genitalia morphogenesis; regulation of cell population proliferation; immune response; neural tube development; embryonic digestive tract morphogenesis; alpha-beta T cell differentiation; beta-catenin-TCF complex assembly; regulation of transcription by RNA polymerase II; canonical Wnt signaling pathway
Sources:Amigo / QuickGO
Orthologs
Databases	NCBI: entry; OMA: entry
Species	Human	Mouse
Entrez	6932	21414
Ensembl	ENSG00000081059	ENSMUSG00000000782
UniProt	P36402	Q00417
RefSeq (mRNA)	NM_001134851; NM_001134852; NM_003202; NM_201632; NM_201634 NM_213648; NM_001346425; NM_001346450; NM_001366502	NM_009331; NM_001313981
RefSeq (protein)	NP_001128323; NP_001333354; NP_001333379; NP_003193; NP_963963 NP_963965; NP_998813; NP_001353431	NP_001300910; NP_033357
Location (UCSC)	Chr 5: 134.11 – 134.15 Mb	Chr 11: 52.25 – 52.28 Mb
PubMed search
- Wikidata
View/Edit Human	View/Edit Mouse

Transcription factor 7 is the gene that in humans encodes for the TCF1 protein.
