= Adenomatous polyposis coli =

Protein found in humans

APC
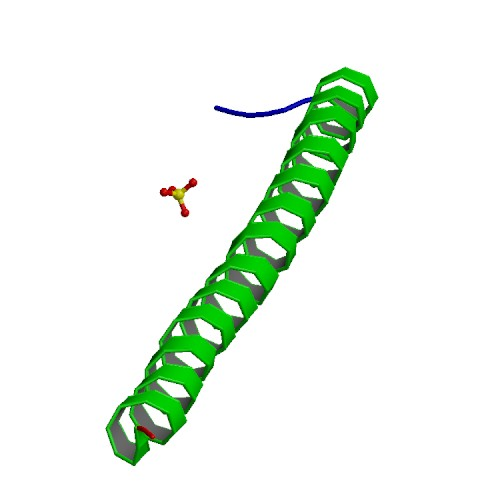

Identifiers
- Aliases: APC, BTPS2, DP2, DP2.5, DP3, GS, PPP1R46, adenomatous polyposis coli, WNT signaling pathway regulator, Genes
- External IDs: OMIM: 611731; MGI: 88039; GeneCards: APC
Available structures
PDB	Ortholog search: PDBe RCSB
PDB	List of PDB id codes 1DEB, 1EMU, 1JPP, 1M5I, 1T08, 1TH1, 1V18, 2RQU, 3AU3, 3NMW, 3NMX, 3NMZ, 3QHE, 3RL7, 3RL8, 3T7U, 4G69, 4YJL, 4YK6, 4YJE

Gene location (Mouse)
Chr.	Chromosome 18 (mouse)
Band	18 B1|18 18.53 cM	Start	34,220,924 bp
Band	18 B1|18 18.53 cM	End	34,322,552 bp
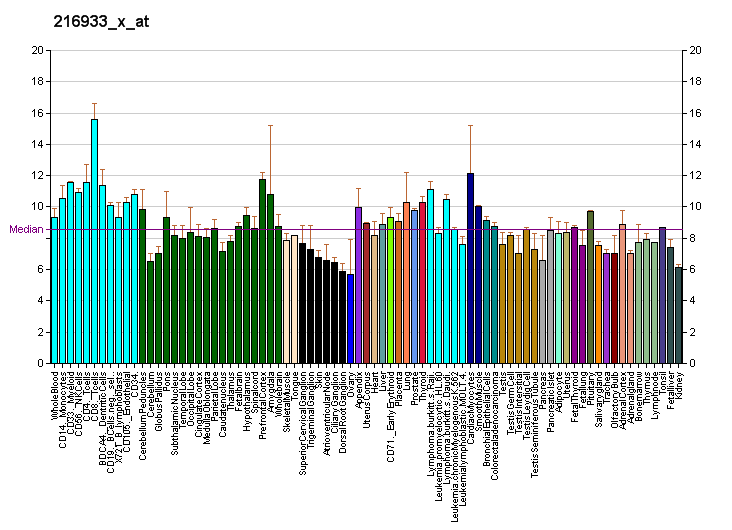
RNA expression pattern
Bgee	Human / Mouse (ortholog); n/a / Top expressed in: olfactory bulb; substantia nigra; lateral geniculate nucleus; pontine nuclei; medial dorsal nucleus; subiculum; medial geniculate nucleus; anterior horn of spinal cord; genital tubercle; tail of embryo
BioGPS	More reference expression data
Gene ontology
Molecular function	gamma-catenin binding; protein kinase binding; microtubule plus-end binding; microtubule binding; cadherin binding; protein kinase regulator activity; protein binding; beta-catenin binding; ubiquitin protein ligase binding; identical protein binding; dynein complex binding
Cellular component	cytoskeleton; adherens junction; beta-catenin destruction complex; nucleoplasm; cytoplasm; cell projection; cytosol; catenin complex; cell junction; nucleus; lamellipodium; membrane; Wnt signalosome; centrosome; kinetochore; bicellular tight junction; ruffle membrane; plasma membrane; lateral plasma membrane; perinuclear region of cytoplasm; microtubule; cytoplasmic microtubule
Biological process	negative regulation of cell population proliferation; negative regulation of cyclin-dependent protein serine/threonine kinase activity; mitotic spindle assembly checkpoint signaling; positive regulation of cell migration; positive regulation of protein catabolic process; bicellular tight junction assembly; regulation of microtubule-based process; positive regulation of pseudopodium assembly; regulation of attachment of spindle microtubules to kinetochore; cellular response to DNA damage stimulus; negative regulation of Wnt signaling pathway; cell adhesion; mitotic cytokinesis; negative regulation of microtubule depolymerization; positive regulation of apoptotic process; canonical Wnt signaling pathway; cell migration; beta-catenin destruction complex assembly; beta-catenin destruction complex disassembly; negative regulation of canonical Wnt signaling pathway; Wnt signaling pathway; protein deubiquitination; insulin receptor signaling pathway; positive regulation of cell death; protein homooligomerization; positive regulation of protein localization to centrosome; protein-containing complex assembly; cell fate specification; pattern specification process; regulation of cell differentiation; positive regulation of cold-induced thermogenesis
Sources:Amigo / QuickGO
Orthologs
Databases	NCBI: entry; OMA: entry
Species	Human	Mouse
Entrez	324	11789
Ensembl	ENSG00000134982	ENSMUSG00000005871
UniProt	P25054	Q61315
RefSeq (mRNA)	NM_001127511; NM_000038; NM_001127510	NM_007462; NM_001360979; NM_001360980
RefSeq (protein)	NP_000029; NP_001120982; NP_001120983; NP_001341824; NP_001341825 NP_001341826; NP_001341827; NP_001341828; NP_001341829; NP_001341830; NP_001341831; NP_001341832; NP_001341833; NP_001341834; NP_001341835	n/a
Location (UCSC)	n/a	Chr 18: 34.22 – 34.32 Mb
PubMed search
- Wikidata
View/Edit Human	View/Edit Mouse

Adenomatous polyposis coli (APC) also known as deleted in polyposis 2.5 (DP2.5) is a protein that in humans is encoded by the APC gene. The APC protein is a negative regulator that controls beta-catenin concentrations and interacts with E-cadherin, which are involved in cell adhesion. Mutations in the APC gene may result in colorectal cancer and desmoid tumors.

APC is classified as a tumor suppressor gene. Tumor suppressor genes prevent the uncontrolled growth of cells that may result in cancerous tumors. The protein made by the APC gene plays a critical role in several cellular processes that determine whether a cell may develop into a tumor. The APC protein helps control how often a cell divides, how it attaches to other cells within a tissue, how the cell polarizes and the morphogenesis of the 3D structures, or whether a cell moves within or away from tissue. This protein also helps ensure that the chromosome number in cells produced through cell division is correct. The APC protein accomplishes these tasks mainly through association with other proteins, especially those that are involved in cell attachment and signaling. The activity of one protein in particular, beta-catenin, is controlled by the APC protein (see: Wnt signaling pathway). Regulation of beta-catenin prevents genes that stimulate cell division from being turned on too often and prevents cell overgrowth.

The human APC gene is located on the long (q) arm of chromosome 5 in band q22.2 (5q22.2). The APC gene has been shown to contain an internal ribosome entry site. APC orthologs have also been identified in all mammals for which complete genome data are available.

== Structure ==
The full-length human protein comprises 2,843 amino acids with a (predicted) molecular mass of 311646 Da. Several N-terminal domains have been structurally elucidated in unique atomistic high-resolution complex structures. Most of the protein is predicted to be intrinsically disordered. It is not known if this large predicted unstructured region from amino acid 800 to 2843 persists in vivo or would form stabilised complexes – possibly with yet unidentified interacting proteins. Recently, it has been experimentally confirmed that the mutation cluster region around the center of APC is intrinsically disordered in vitro.

== Role in cancer ==
The most common mutation in colon cancer is inactivation of APC. In absence of APC inactivating mutations, colon cancers commonly carry activating mutations in beta catenin or inactivating mutations in RNF43. Mutations in APC can be inherited, or arise sporadically in the somatic cells, often as the result of mutations in other genes that result in the inability to repair mutations in the DNA. In order for cancer to develop, both alleles (copies of the APC gene) must be mutated. Mutations in APC or β-catenin must be followed by other mutations to become cancerous; however, in carriers of an APC-inactivating mutation, the risk of colorectal cancer by age 40 is almost 100%.

Familial adenomatous polyposis (FAP) is caused by an inherited, inactivating mutation in the APC gene. More than 800 mutations in the APC gene have been identified in families with classic and attenuated types of familial adenomatous polyposis. Most of these mutations cause the production of an APC protein that is abnormally short and presumably nonfunctional. This short protein cannot suppress the cellular overgrowth that leads to the formation of polyps, which can become cancerous. The most common mutation in familial adenomatous polyposis is a deletion of five bases in the APC gene. This mutation changes the sequence of amino acids in the resulting APC protein beginning at position 1309. Mutations in the APC gene have also been found to lead to the development of desmoid tumors in FAP patients.

Another mutation is carried by approximately 6 percent of people of Ashkenazi (eastern and central European) Jewish heritage. This mutation results in the substitution of the amino acid lysine for isoleucine at position 1307 in the APC protein (also written as I1307K or Ile1307Lys). This change has been shown to be associated with an increased risk of colon cancer, with moderate effect size. APC I1307K has also been implicated as a risk factor for certain other cancers.

== Regulation of proliferation ==
The (Adenomatous Polyposis Coli) APC protein normally builds a "destruction complex" with glycogen synthase kinase 3-alpha and/or beta (GSK-3α/β) and Axin via interactions with the 20 AA and SAMP repeats. This complex is then able to bind β-catenins in the cytoplasm, that have dissociated from adherens contacts between cells. With the help of casein kinase 1 (CK1), which carries out an initial phosphorylation of β-catenin, GSK-3β is able to phosphorylate β-catenin a second time. This targets β-catenin for ubiquitination and degradation by cellular proteasomes. This prevents it from translocating into the nucleus, where it acts as a transcription factor for proliferation genes. APC is also thought to be targeted to microtubules via the PDZ binding domain, stabilizing them. The deactivation of the APC protein can take place after certain chain reactions in the cytoplasm are started, e.g. through the Wnt signals that destroy the conformation of the complex. In the nucleus it complexes with legless/BCL9, TCF, and Pygo.

The ability of APC to bind β-catenin has been classically considered to be an integral part of the protein's mechanistic function in the destruction complex, along with binding to Axin through the SAMP repeats. These models have been substantiated by observations that common APC loss of function mutations in the mutation cluster region often remove several β-catenin binding sites and SAMP repeats. However, recent evidence from Yamulla and colleagues have directly tested those models and imply that APC's core mechanistic functions may not require direct binding to β-catenin, but necessitate interactions with Axin. The researchers hypothesized that APC's many β-catenin binding sites increase the protein's efficiency at destroying β-catenin, yet are not absolutely necessary for the protein's mechanistic function. Further research is clearly necessary to elucidate the precise mechanistic function of APC in the destruction complex.

== Mutations ==
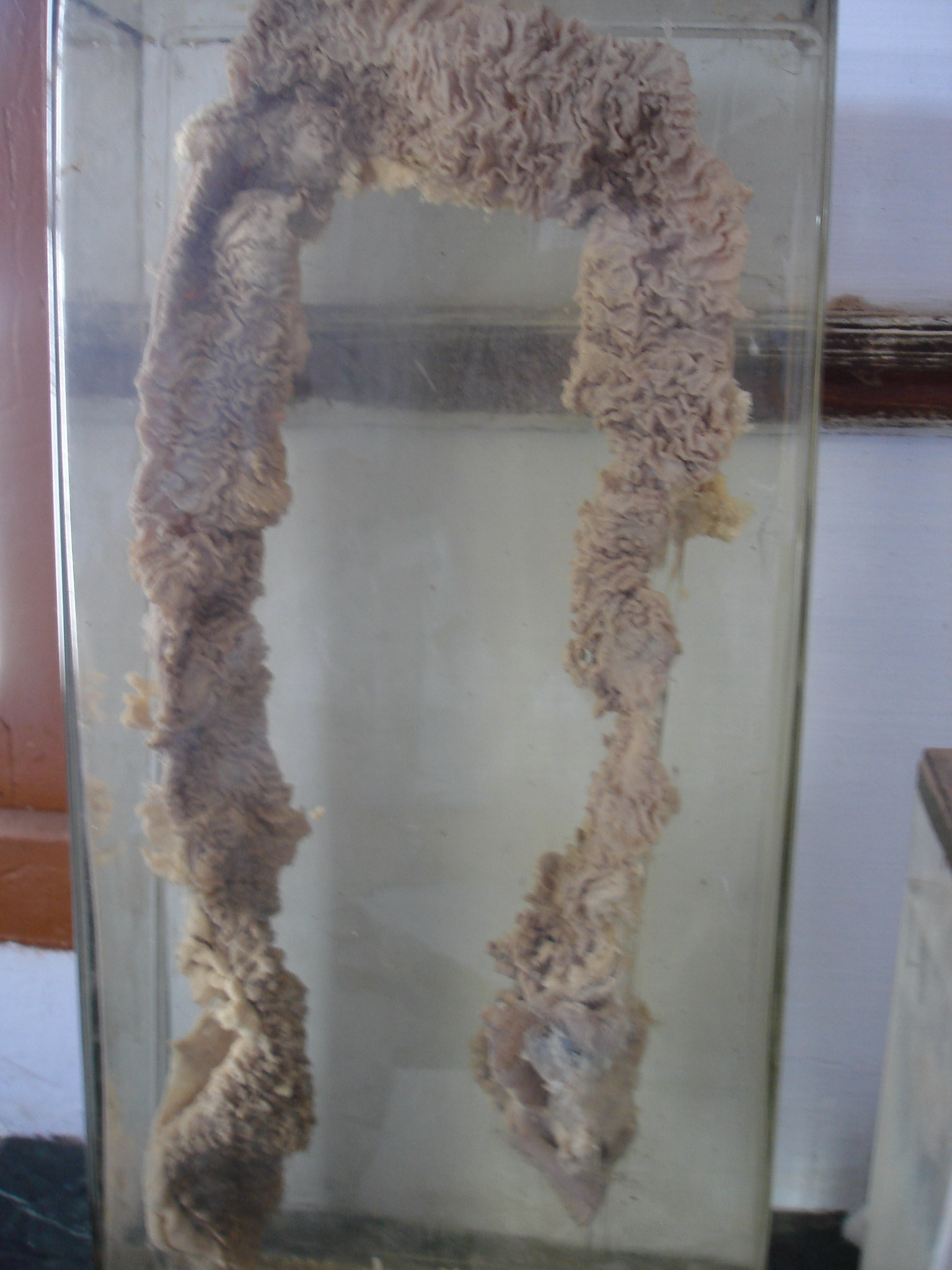
Familial adenomatous polyposis of the intestine

Mutations in APC often occur early on in cancers such as colon cancer. Patients with familial adenomatous polyposis (FAP) have germline mutations, with 95% being nonsense/frameshift mutations leading to premature stop codons. 33% of mutations occur between amino acids 1061–1309. In somatic mutations, over 60% occur within a mutation cluster region (1286–1513), causing loss of axin-binding sites in all but one of the 20AA repeats. Mutations in APC lead to loss of β-catenin regulation, altered cell migration and chromosome instability.

== Neurological role ==
Rosenberg et al. found that APC directs cholinergic synapse assembly between neurons, a finding with implications for autonomic neuropathies, for Alzheimer's disease, for age-related hearing loss, and for some forms of epilepsy and schizophrenia. ^{(29)}

== Interactions ==
APC (gene) has been shown to interact with:

- ARHGEF4,
- AXIN1,
- BUB1,
- CTNNB1,
- CSNK2B,
- CSNK2A1,
- Catenin (cadherin-associated protein), alpha 1,
- DLG3,
- KIFAP3,
- MAPRE2,
- JUP,
- SIAH1,
- TFAP2A,
- TUBA4A and
- XPO1.

Overview of signal transduction pathways involved in apoptosis.

== See also ==
- MUTYH
