= MOS (gene) =

Protein-coding gene in the species Homo sapiens

Identifiers
- Aliases: MOS, MSV, v-mos Moloney murine sarcoma viral oncogene homolog, MOS proto-oncogene, serine/threonine kinase
- External IDs: OMIM: 190060; MGI: 97052; GeneCards: MOS
Enzyme activity
EC #	BRENDA	ExPASy	KEGG	MetaCyc
2.7.11.1	↗	↗	↗	↗

Gene location (Human)
Chr.	Chromosome 8 (human)
Band	8q12.1	Start	56,112,942 bp
Band	8q12.1	End	56,113,982 bp

Gene location (Mouse)
Chr.	Chromosome 4 (mouse)
Band	4 A1|4 2.16 cM	Start	3,870,657 bp
Band	4 A1|4 2.16 cM	End	3,872,105 bp
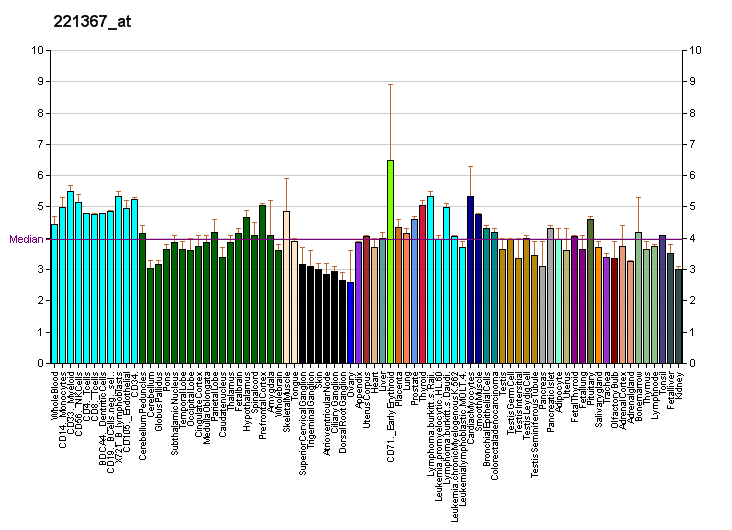
RNA expression pattern
Bgee	Human / Mouse (ortholog); Top expressed in: oocyte; secondary oocyte; pancreatic ductal cell; tibialis anterior muscle; stromal cell of endometrium; testicle; left testis; right testis; hippocampal formation; hippocampus proper / Top expressed in: primary oocyte; secondary oocyte; zygote; embryo; spermatid; embryo; blastocyst; ventricular zone; ovary; spermatocyte; More reference expression data
BioGPS	More reference expression data
Gene ontology
Molecular function	transferase activity; nucleotide binding; protein kinase activity; protein binding; MAP kinase kinase kinase activity; ATP binding; kinase activity; protein serine/threonine kinase activity; signal transducer activity
Cellular component	cytoplasm; cytosol
Biological process	protein autophosphorylation; establishment of meiotic spindle orientation; chromatin organization; meiotic spindle organization; phosphorylation; MAPK cascade; intracellular signal transduction; positive regulation of MAPK cascade; negative regulation of metaphase/anaphase transition of meiotic cell cycle; protein phosphorylation
Sources:Amigo / QuickGO
Orthologs
Databases	NCBI: entry; OMA: entry
Species	Human	Mouse
Entrez	4342	17451
Ensembl	ENSG00000172680	ENSMUSG00000078365
UniProt	P00540	P00536
RefSeq (mRNA)	NM_005372	NM_020021
RefSeq (protein)	NP_005363	NP_064405
Location (UCSC)	Chr 8: 56.11 – 56.11 Mb	Chr 4: 3.87 – 3.87 Mb
PubMed search
- Wikidata
View/Edit Human	View/Edit Mouse

Proto-oncogene serine/threonine-protein kinase mos is an enzyme that in humans is encoded by the MOS gene.

== Interactions ==
MOS (gene) has been shown to interact with MyoD.
