= HslUV =

HSLuv or HslUV may refer to:

- HslVU, a protein
- HslUV protease, an enzyme
- HSLuv, a color space
