= Intracellular antibody-mediated degradation =

Intracellular antibody-mediated degradation (IAMD) is a neutralization mechanism of intracellular antibody-mediated immunity whereby an effector protein, TRIM21, directs antibody bound virions to the proteasome where they are degraded. As yet, it has only been observed to act against the adenovirus but is likely to also be effective against other non-enveloped viruses.

== Mechanism of action ==
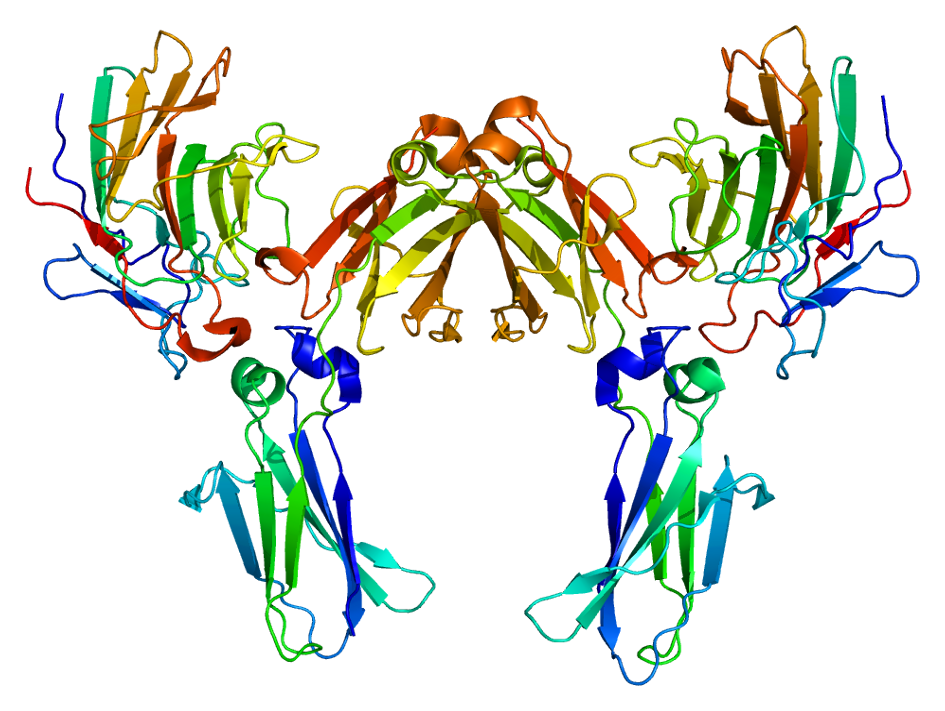
Crystallographic structure of two molecules of the C-terminal PRYSPRY domain of TRIM21 (top right and top left) complexed with homodimeric Ig gamma-1 chain C region (center).

In IAMD, the neutralization of the pathogen follows a non-cytotoxic mechanism. That is, the infected cell is not attacked as in Antibody-dependent cell-mediated cytotoxicity, instead the virions are rapidly destroyed and the cell may be relieved of infection.

1. Immunoglobulin G (IgG) binds specifically to the target antigen presented on the pathogen extracellularly
2. The antibody bound pathogen infects a host cell
3. In the cytosol, TRIM21 (a protein of the Tripartite motif family) binds with high affinity to IgG
4. TRIM21 is conjugated with ubiquitin, which directs the complex to the proteasome
5. Degradation by proteolysis of both the protein capsid and the antibody occurs, but not the TRIM21 protein

== Resistance to mutants ==
There are a number of reasons why IAMD is so resistant to evasion by mutants through evolution:

- The targeting of pathogens by antibodies is adaptive while the degradation is innate; the overall response therefore combines both adaptive and innate immunity.
- The proteasomal targeting is mediated by the autoubiquitination of TRIM21, there is no direct interaction with the pathogen so mutants which evade ubiquitination themselves cannot evade IAMD.
- Unlike extracellular humoral immune responses, this intracellular mechanism is expressed in most human tissues and is an example of encapsulating immunity as opposed to mere immune surveillance.

== See also ==
- Proteasomal pathway
