= TRIM21 =

Protein-coding gene in the species Homo sapiens

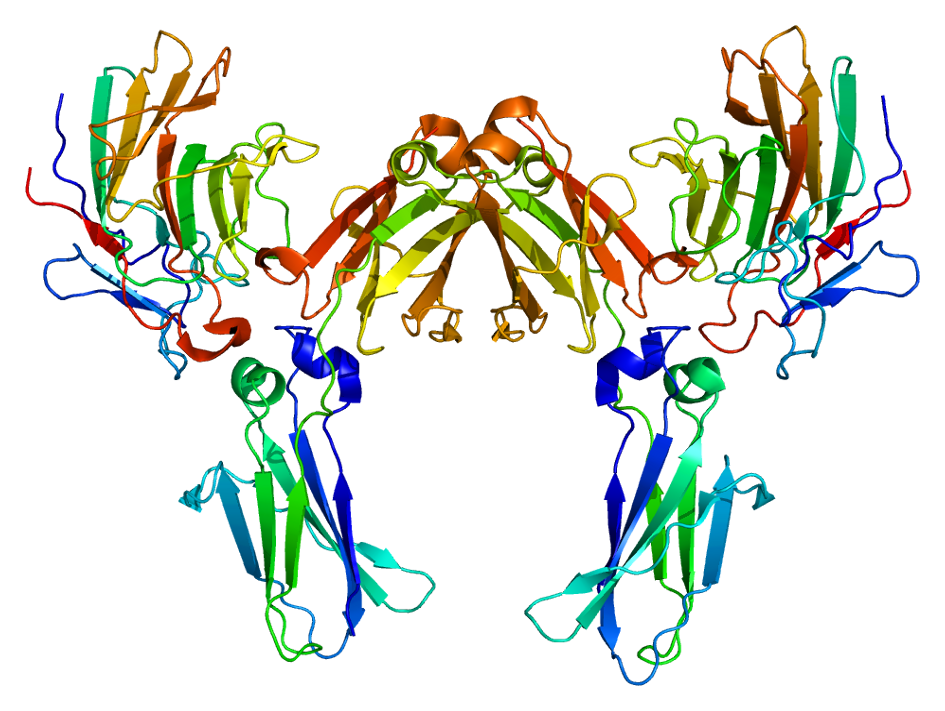
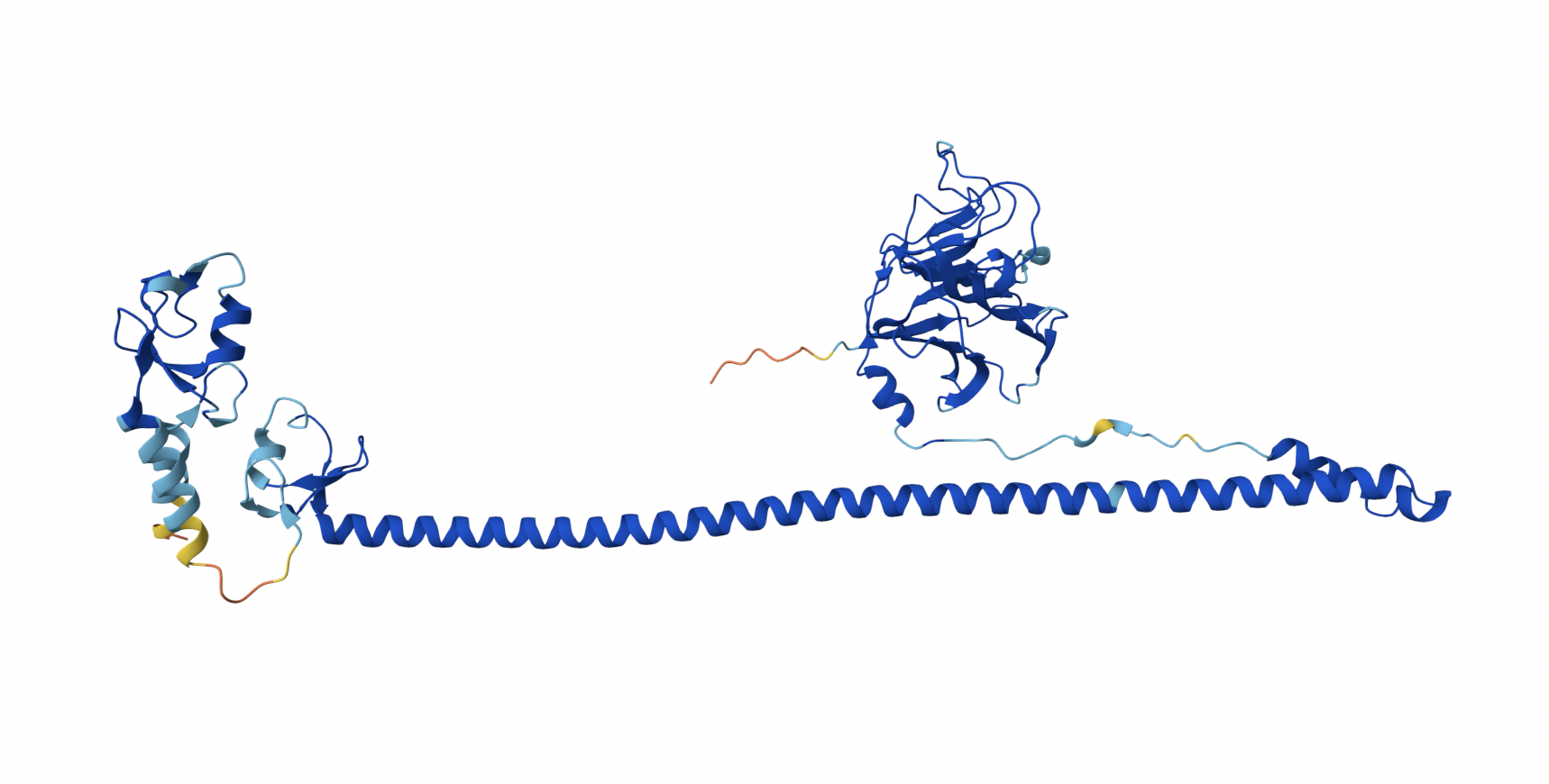

Identifiers
- Aliases: TRIM21, RNF81, RO52, Ro/SSA, SSA, SSA1, tripartite motif containing 21, Tripartite motif-containing protein 21
- External IDs: OMIM: 109092; MGI: 106657; GeneCards: TRIM21
Available structures
PDB	Ortholog search: PDBe RCSB
PDB	List of PDB id codes 2IWG
Enzyme activity
EC #	BRENDA	ExPASy	KEGG	MetaCyc
2.3.2.27	↗	↗	↗	↗

Gene location (Human)
Chr.	Chromosome 11 (human)
Band	11p15.4	Start	4,384,897 bp
Band	11p15.4	End	4,393,702 bp

Gene location (Mouse)
Chr.	Chromosome 7 (mouse)
Band	7|7 E3	Start	102,207,128 bp
Band	7|7 E3	End	102,214,693 bp
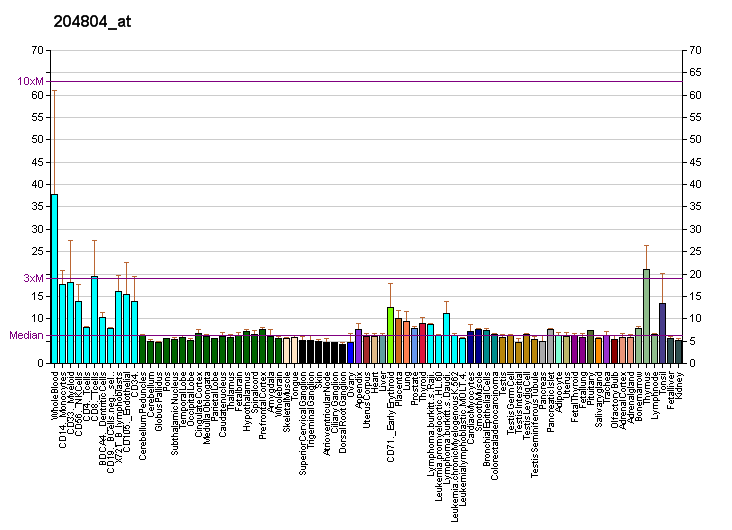
RNA expression pattern
Bgee	Human / Mouse (ortholog); Top expressed in: granulocyte; monocyte; blood; mucosa of transverse colon; spleen; rectum; epithelium of colon; apex of heart; Descending thoracic aorta; mucosa of ileum / Top expressed in: Ileal epithelium; Paneth cell; mesenteric lymph nodes; lumbar spinal ganglion; thymus; blood; granulocyte; carotid body; spleen; Epithelium of choroid plexus; More reference expression data
BioGPS	More reference expression data
Gene ontology
Molecular function	DNA binding; zinc ion binding; metal ion binding; protein binding; RNA binding; identical protein binding; ubiquitin-protein transferase activity; transferase activity
Cellular component	cytoplasm; cytosol; SCF ubiquitin ligase complex; P-body; intracellular anatomical structure; autophagosome; cytoplasmic vesicle; nucleus; nucleoplasm; ribonucleoprotein complex
Biological process	negative regulation of protein deubiquitination; response to interferon-gamma; positive regulation of autophagy; interferon-gamma-mediated signaling pathway; protein trimerization; positive regulation of viral entry into host cell; positive regulation of DNA-binding transcription factor activity; protein monoubiquitination; regulation of type I interferon production; positive regulation of cell cycle; protein destabilization; protein ubiquitination; cell cycle; negative regulation of NF-kappaB transcription factor activity; protein autoubiquitination; innate immune response; protein polyubiquitination; negative regulation of viral transcription
Sources:Amigo / QuickGO
Orthologs
Databases	NCBI: entry; OMA: entry
Species	Human	Mouse
Entrez	6737	20821
Ensembl	ENSG00000132109	ENSMUSG00000030966
UniProt	P19474	Q62191
RefSeq (mRNA)	NM_003141	NM_001082552; NM_009277
RefSeq (protein)	NP_003132	n/a
Location (UCSC)	Chr 11: 4.38 – 4.39 Mb	Chr 7: 102.21 – 102.21 Mb
PubMed search
- Wikidata
View/Edit Human	View/Edit Mouse

Tripartite motif-containing protein 21, also known as E3 ubiquitin-protein ligase TRIM21, is a protein that in humans is encoded by the TRIM21 gene. Alternatively spliced transcript variants for this gene have been described but the full-length nature of only one has been determined. It is expressed in most human tissues.

== Structure ==
TRIM21 is a member of the tripartite motif (TRIM) family. The TRIM motif includes three zinc-binding domains, a RING finger domain, a B-box type 1 and a B-box type 2 zinc finger, and a coiled coil region.

== Function ==
TRIM21 is an intracellular antibody effector in the intracellular antibody-mediated proteolysis pathway. It recognizes Fc domain and binds to immunoglobulin G, immunoglobulin A and immunoglobulin M on antibody marked non-enveloped virions which have infected the cell. Either by autoubiquitination or by ubiquitination of a cofactor, it is then responsible for directing the virions to the proteasome. TRIM21 itself is not degraded in the proteasome unlike both the viral capsid and the bound antibody.

TRIM21 is part of the RoSSA ribonucleoprotein, which includes a single polypeptide and one of four small RNA molecules. The RoSSA particle localizes to both the cytoplasm and the nucleus.

== Clinical significance ==
RoSSA interacts with autoantigens in patients with Sjögren's syndrome and systemic lupus erythematosus. In addition, the inability for lupus-prone macrophages to degrade immune complexes in the lysosome results in the leakage of autoantibodies into the cytosol that can bind to TRIM21 and enhance NF-κB signaling.

TRIM21 can be used to knockout specific proteins with their corresponding antibodies, a method known as Trim-Away. In this assay, TRIM21 and antibodies are delivered into cells through electroporation, and the targeted protein is degraded within a few minutes.
