= DSS1/SEM1 protein family =

DSS1_SEM1
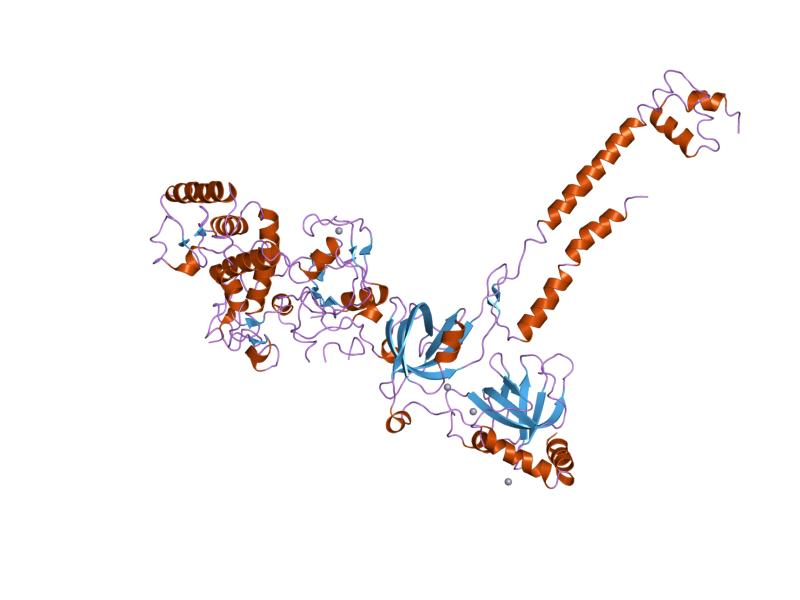
- structure of a brca2-dss1 complex

Identifiers
- Symbol: DSS1_SEM1
- Pfam: PF05160
- InterPro: IPR007834
- SCOP2: 1iyj / SCOPe / SUPFAM
Available protein structures:
- PDB: IPR007834 PF05160 (ECOD; PDBsum)
- AlphaFold: IPR007834; PF05160

In molecular biology, the DSS1/SEM1 protein family is a family of short acidic proteins which includes the 26S proteasome complex subunits SEM1 from Saccharomyces cerevisiae and Drosophila and DSS1 (SHFM1) in mammals. In Saccharomyces cerevisiae, SEM1 is a regulator of both exocyst function and pseudohyphal differentiation. Loss of DSS1 in Homo sapiens (human) has been associated with split hand/split foot malformations. DSS1 is playing role as a modifier in a novel protein posttranslational modification, referred to as DSSylation, which is probably targeting oxidized proteins and guiding them to proteasomal degradation.
