= Proteasome =

Protein complexes which degrade ubiquitin-tagged proteins by proteolysis

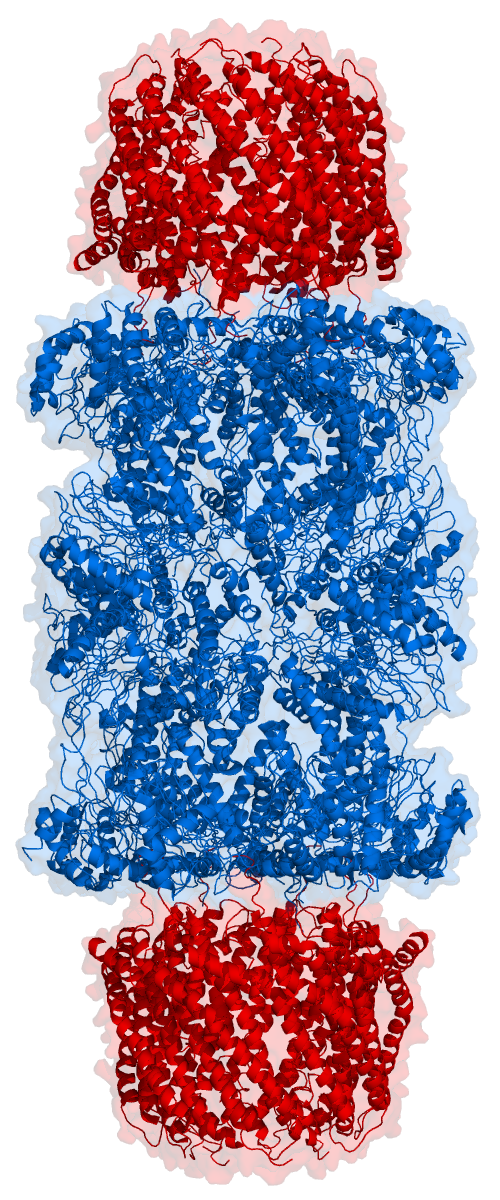
Cartoon representation of a proteasome. Its active sites are sheltered inside the tube (blue). The caps (red; in this case, 11S regulatory particles) on the ends regulate entry into the destruction chamber, where the protein is degraded.

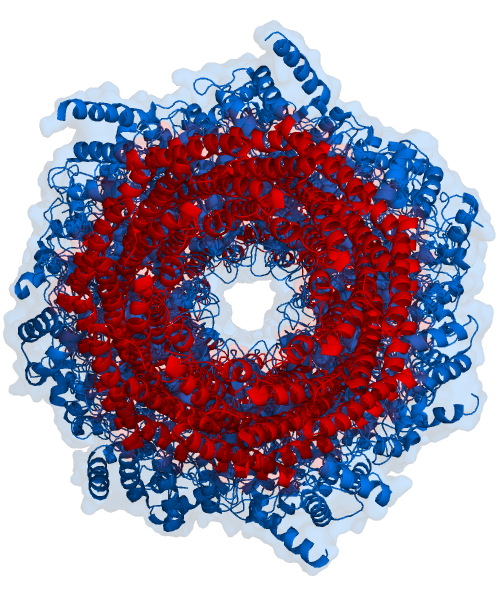
Top view of the proteasome above.

Proteasomes are essential protein complexes responsible for the degradation of proteins by proteolysis, a chemical reaction that breaks peptide bonds. Enzymes that help such reactions are called proteases. Proteasomes are found inside all eukaryotes and archaea, and in some bacteria. In eukaryotes, proteasomes are located both in the nucleus and in the cytoplasm. The proteasomal degradation pathway is essential for many cellular processes, including the cell cycle, the regulation of gene expression, and responses to oxidative stress. The importance of proteolytic degradation inside cells and the role of ubiquitin in proteolytic pathways was acknowledged in the award of the 2004 Nobel Prize in Chemistry to Aaron Ciechanover, Avram Hershko and Irwin Rose.

The core 20S proteasome (blue in the adjacent figure) is a cylindrical, compartmental protein complex of four stacked rings forming a central pore. Each ring is composed of seven individual proteins. The inner two rings are made of seven β subunits that contain three to seven protease active sites, within the central chamber of the complex. Access to these proteases is gated on the top of the 20S, and access is regulated by several large protein complexes, including the 19S Regulatory Particle forming the 26S Proteasome. In eukaryotes, proteins that are tagged with Ubiquitin are targeted to the 26S proteasome and is the penultimate step of the Ubiquitin Proteasome System (UPS). Proteasomes are part of a major mechanism by which cells regulate the concentration of particular proteins and degrade misfolded proteins.

Proteins that are destined for degradation by the 26S proteasome require two main elements: 1) the attachment of a small protein called ubiquitin and 2) an unstructured region of about 25 amino acids. Proteins that lack this unstructured region can have another motor, cdc48 in yeast or P97 in humans, generate this unstructured region by a unique mechanism where ubiquitin is unfolded by cdc48 and its cofactors Npl4/Ufd1. The tagging of a target protein by ubiquitin is catalyzed by cascade of enzymes consisting of the Ubiquitin-activating enzyme (E1), Ubiquitin-conjugating enzyme (E2), and ubiquitin ligases (E3). Once a protein is tagged with a single ubiquitin molecule, this is a signal to other ligases to attach additional ubiquitin molecules. The result is a polyubiquitin chain that is bound by the proteasome, allowing it to degrade the tagged protein in an ATP dependent manner. The degradation process by the proteasome yields peptides of about seven to eight amino acids long, which can then be further degraded into shorter amino acid sequences and used in synthesizing new proteins.

== Discovery ==
Before the discovery of the ubiquitin–proteasome system, protein degradation in cells was thought to rely mainly on lysosomes, membrane-bound organelles with acidic and protease-filled interiors that can degrade and then recycle exogenous proteins and aged or damaged organelles. However, work by Joseph Etlinger and Alfred L. Goldberg in 1977 on ATP-dependent protein degradation in reticulocytes, which lack lysosomes, suggested the presence of a second intracellular degradation mechanism. This was shown in 1978 to be composed of several distinct protein chains, a novelty among proteases at the time. Later work on modification of histones led to the identification of an unexpected covalent modification of the histone protein by a bond between a lysine side chain of the histone and the C-terminal glycine residue of ubiquitin, a protein that had no known function. It was then discovered that a previously identified protein associated with proteolytic degradation, known as ATP-dependent proteolysis factor 1 (APF-1), was the same protein as ubiquitin. The proteolytic activities of this system were isolated as a multi-protein complex originally called the multi-catalytic proteinase complex by Sherwin Wilk and Marion Orlowski. Later, the ATP-dependent proteolytic complex that was responsible for ubiquitin-dependent protein degradation was discovered and was called the 26S proteasome.

Much of the early work leading up to the discovery of the ubiquitin proteasome system occurred in the late 1970s and early 1980s at the Technion in the laboratory of Avram Hershko, where Aaron Ciechanover worked as a graduate student. Hershko's year-long sabbatical in the laboratory of Irwin Rose at the Fox Chase Cancer Center provided key conceptual insights, though Rose later downplayed his role in the discovery. The three shared the 2004 Nobel Prize in Chemistry for their work in discovering this system.

Although electron microscopy (EM) data revealing the stacked-ring structure of the proteasome became available in the mid-1980s, the first structure of the proteasome core particle was not solved by X-ray crystallography until 1994. Groundbreaking work on cryo-EM by Wolfgang Baumeister's group revealed the overall architecture of the 26S proteasome and enabled biochemical experiments to provide a general mechanism for ubiquitin dependent degradation. In 2018, the first structure of the yeast 26S proteasome followed by the first atomic structures of the human 26S proteasome holoenzyme in complex with a polyubiquitylated protein substrate were solved by cryogenic electron microscopy, confirming the mechanisms by which the substrate is recognized, deubiquitylated, unfolded and degraded by the 26S proteasome. Detailed biochemistry has provided a general mechanism for ubiquitin-dependent degradation by the proteasome: binding of a substrate to the proteasome, engagement of an unstructured region to the AAA motor accompanied by a major conformational change of the proteasome, translocation dependent de-ubiquitination by Rpn11, followed by unfolding and proteolysis by the 20S core particle.

Cryo-Electron tomography (Cryo-ET) has also provided unique insight into proteasomes within cells. Looking at neurons, proteasomes were found to be in the same ground-state and processing states as determined by cryo-EM. Interestingly, most proteasomes were in the ground state suggesting that they were ready to start working when a cell undergoes proteotoxic stress. In a separate study, when protein aggregates in the form of poly-Gly-Ala repeats are overexpressed, proteasome are captured stalled on these aggregates. Cryo-ET of green algae Chlamydomonas reinhardtii found that 26S proteasomes within the nucleus cluster around the Nuclear pore complex and are specifically attached to the membrane.

== Structure and organization ==
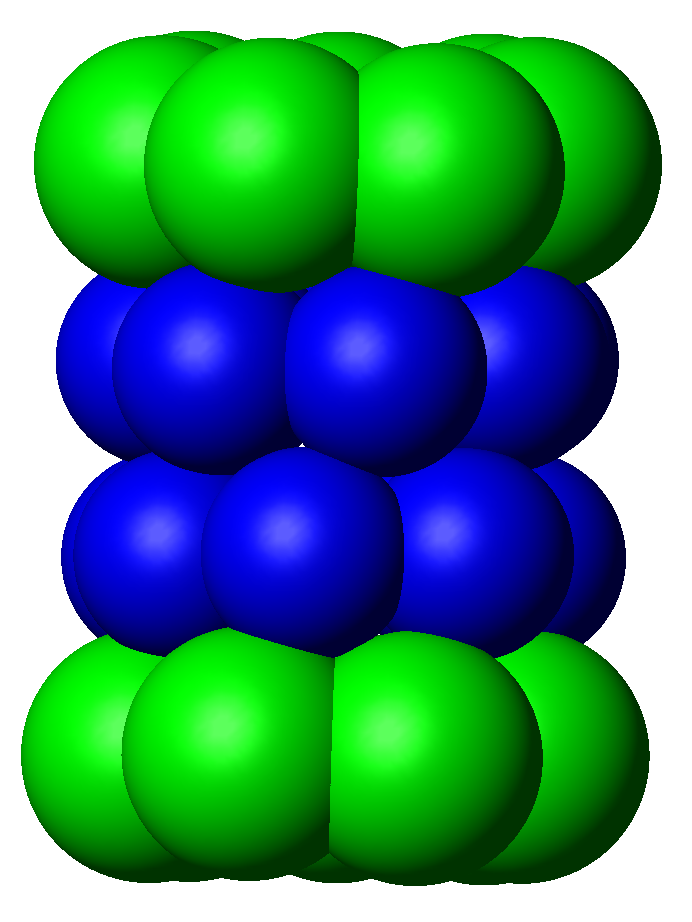
Schematic diagram of the proteasome 20S core particle viewed from one side. The α subunits that make up the outer two rings are shown in green, and the β subunits that make up the inner two rings are shown in blue.

The proteasome subcomponents are often referred to by their Svedberg sedimentation coefficient (denoted S). The proteasome most exclusively used in mammals is the cytosolic 26S proteasome, which is about 2000 kDa in molecular mass containing one 20S protein subcomplex and one 19S regulatory cap subcomplex. Doubly capped proteasomes are referred to as 30S proteasomes also exist in the cell. The 20S core is hollow and provides an enclosed cavity in which proteins are degraded; openings at the two ends of the core are gates that allow the target protein to enter. Each end of the core particle can associate with a 19S regulatory subunit that contains multiple ATPase active sites and ubiquitin binding sites; it is this structure that recognizes polyubiquitinated proteins and transfers them to the catalytic core.

Several alternative caps can also bind the 20S core: 11S (PA26) or Blm10 (PA200) are also known to associate with the core and can bind either one or both sides. An alternative form of regulatory subunit called the 11S particle can associate with the core in essentially the same manner as the 19S particle; the 11S may play a role in degradation of foreign peptides such as those produced after infection by a virus. Archaea and bacteria also have proteasomes and have alternative caps that bind their cores. The following will discuss the structure and function of these subcomplexes.

=== 20S core particle ===
The number and diversity of subunits contained in the 20S core particle depends on the organism; the number of distinct and specialized subunits is larger in multicellular than unicellular organisms and larger in eukaryotes than in prokaryotes. All 20S particles consist of four stacked heptameric ring structures that are themselves composed of two different types of subunits; α subunits are structural in nature, whereas β subunits are predominantly catalytic. The α subunits are pseudoenzymes homologous to β subunits. They are assembled with their N-termini adjacent to that of the β subunits. The outer two rings in the stack consist of seven α subunits each, which serve as docking domains for the regulatory particles and the alpha subunits N-termini (Pfam PF10584) form a gate that blocks unregulated access of substrates to the interior cavity. The inner two rings each consist of seven β subunits and in their N-termini contain the protease active sites that perform the proteolysis reactions. Three distinct catalytic activities were identified in the purified complex: chymotrypsin-like, trypsin-like and peptidylglutamyl-peptide hydrolyzing. The size of the proteasome is relatively conserved and is about 150 angstroms (Å) by 115 Å. The interior chamber is at most 53 Å wide, though the entrance can be as narrow as 13 Å, suggesting that substrate proteins must be at least partially unfolded to enter.

In archaea such as Thermoplasma acidophilum, all the α and all the β subunits are identical, whereas eukaryotic proteasomes such as those in yeast contain seven distinct types of each subunit. In mammals, the β1, β2, and β5 subunits are catalytic; although they share a common mechanism, they have three distinct substrate specificities considered chymotrypsin-like, trypsin-like, and peptidyl-glutamyl peptide-hydrolyzing (PHGH). Alternative β forms denoted β1i, β2i, and β5i can be expressed in hematopoietic cells in response to exposure to pro-inflammatory signals such as cytokines, in particular, interferon gamma. The proteasome assembled with these alternative subunits is known as the immunoproteasome, whose substrate specificity is altered relative to the normal proteasome. Recently an alternative proteasome was identified in human cells that lack the α3 core subunit. These proteasomes (known as the α4-α4 proteasomes) instead form 20S core particles containing an additional α4 subunit in place of the missing α3 subunit. These alternative 'α4-α4' proteasomes have been known previously to exist in yeast. Although the precise function of these proteasome isoforms is still largely unknown, cells expressing these proteasomes show enhanced resistance to toxicity induced by metallic ions such as cadmium.

The peptides that are formed by the 20S core have recently been shown to act as important metabolites for both programmed cell death and for immunity. Molecular glues that target BRD4 for degradation, lead to 26S proteasome generated peptides that release Inhibitor of apoptosis (IAPs) leading to Apoptosis, suggesting that the peptides generated by the 26S act as secondary metabolites that drive major cell processes.

=== 19S regulatory particle ===
The 19S particle in eukaryotes consists of 19 individual proteins and is divisible into two subassemblies, a 9-subunit base that binds directly to the α ring of the 20S core particle, and a 10-subunit lid. Six of the nine base proteins are ATPase subunits from the AAA Family, and an evolutionary homolog of these ATPases exists in archaea, called PAN (proteasome-activating nucleotidase). The association of the 19S and 20S particles requires the binding of ATP to the 19S ATPase subunits, and ATP hydrolysis is required for the assembled complex to degrade folded and ubiquitinated proteins. Note that only the step of substrate unfolding requires energy from ATP hydrolysis, while ATP-binding alone can support all the other steps required for protein degradation (e.g., complex assembly, gate opening, translocation, and proteolysis). In fact, ATP binding to the ATPases by itself supports the rapid degradation of unfolded proteins. However, while ATP hydrolysis is required for unfolding only, it is not yet clear whether this energy may be used in the coupling of some of these steps.

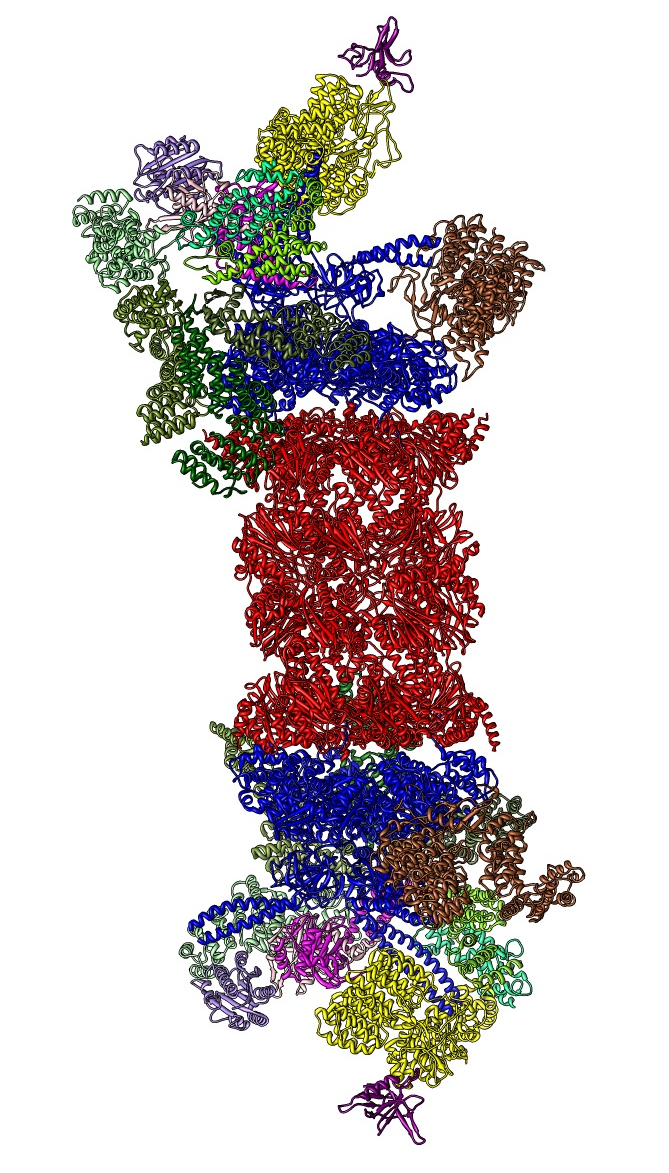
Cartoon representation of the 26S proteasome.

In 2012, two independent efforts have elucidated the molecular architecture of the 26S proteasome by single particle electron microscopy. In 2016, three independent efforts have determined the first near-atomic resolution structure of the human 26S proteasome in the absence of substrates by cryo-EM. In the heart of the 19S, directly adjacent to the 20S, are the AAA-ATPases (AAA proteins) that assemble to a heterohexameric ring of the order Rpt1/Rpt2/Rpt6/Rpt3/Rpt4/Rpt5. This ring is a trimer of dimers: Rpt1/Rpt2, Rpt6/Rpt3, and Rpt4/Rpt5 dimerize via their N-terminal coiled-coils. These coiled-coils protrude from the hexameric ring. The largest regulatory particle non-ATPases Rpn1 and Rpn2 bind to the tips of Rpt1/2 and Rpt6/3, respectively. The ubiquitin receptor Rpn13 binds to Rpn2 and completes the base sub-complex. The lid covers one half of the AAA-ATPase hexamer (Rpt6/Rpt3/Rpt4) and, unexpectedly, directly contacts the 20S via Rpn6 and to lesser extent Rpn5. The subunits Rpn9, Rpn5, Rpn6, Rpn7, Rpn3, and Rpn12, which are structurally related among themselves and to subunits of the COP9 complex and eIF3 (hence called PCI subunits) assemble to a horseshoe-like structure enclosing the Rpn8/Rpn11 heterodimer. Rpn11, the deubiquitinating enzyme, is placed at the mouth of the AAA-ATPase hexamer, ideally positioned to remove ubiquitin moieties immediately before translocation of substrates into the 20S. The second ubiquitin receptor identified to date, Rpn10, is positioned at the periphery of the lid, near subunits Rpn8 and Rpn9.

==== Conformational changes of 19S ====
These initial structures showed that the 19S RP adopted a number of states (termed s1, s2, s3, and s4 in yeast) which provided a model for how substrates were recruited and subsequently degraded by the proteasome. A hallmark of the AAA-ATPase configuration in this predominant low-energy state is a staircase- or lockwasher-like arrangement of the AAA-domains. These states could be manipulated upon the addition of ATPgS, substrate, or by the non-essential DUB Ubp6. The s1 state was proposed to be the resting state of the proteasome, allowing for a protein substrate to engage the AAA motor. Upon binding a substrate, the proteasome would shift to a processing state, in which a central channel from the top of the AAA motor into the 20S proteolytic chamber would form allowing a direct passage of a substrate from the 19S RP into the proteolytic site. Subsequent studies with the human proteasome have shown many more sub-states, and provide a model for ATP dependent translocation of a substrate.

In 2018, the first structure of a processing proteasome bound to a substrate was solved using cryo-EM, confirming biochemistry that showed that de-ubiquitination by Rpn11 was performed in a translocation dependent manner and revealing key steps in translocation. Subsequently, a major effort has elucidated the detailed structures of deubiquitylation, initiation of translocation and processive unfolding of substrates by determining seven atomic structures of substrate-engaged 26S proteasome simultaneously.

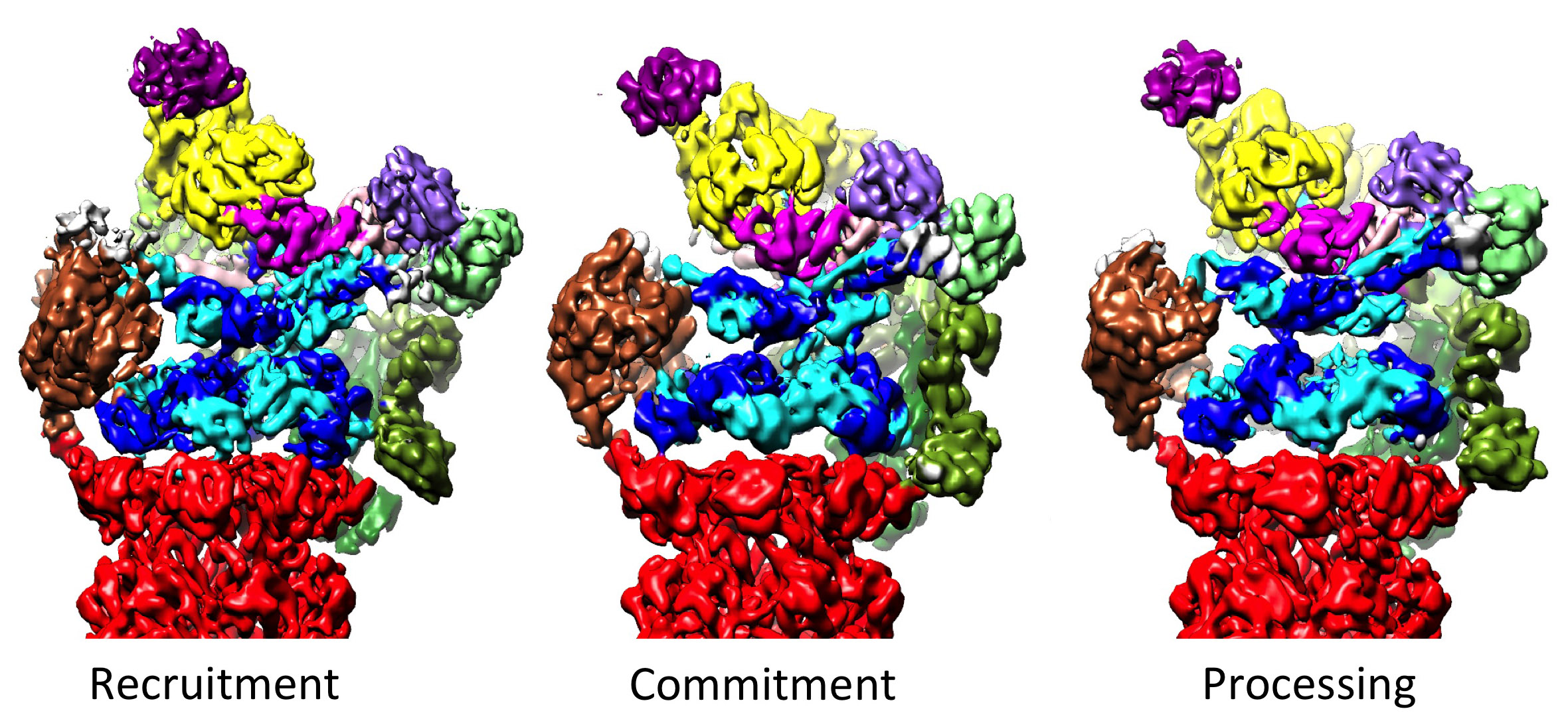
Three distinct conformational states of the 26S proteasome. The conformations are hypothesized to be responsible for recruitment of the substrate, its irreversible commitment, and finally processing and translocation into the core particle, where degradation occurs.

=== Regulation of the 20S by the 19S ===
The 19S regulatory particle is responsible for stimulating the 20S to degrade proteins. A primary function of the 19S regulatory ATPases is to open the gate in the 20S that blocks the entry of substrates into the degradation chamber. The mechanism by which the proteasomal ATPase open this gate has been recently elucidated. 20S gate opening, and thus substrate degradation, requires the C-termini of the proteasomal ATPases, which contains a specific motif (i.e., HbYX motif). The ATPases C-termini bind into pockets in the top of the 20S, and tether the ATPase complex to the 20S proteolytic complex, thus joining the substrate unfolding equipment with the 20S degradation machinery. Binding of these C-termini into these 20S pockets by themselves stimulates opening of the gate in the 20S in much the same way that a "key-in-a-lock" opens a door. The precise mechanism by which this "key-in-a-lock" mechanism functions has been structurally elucidated in the context of human 26S proteasome at near-atomic resolution, suggesting that the insertion of five C-termini of ATPase subunits Rpt1/2/3/5/6 into the 20S surface pockets are required to fully open the 20S gate, confirming work previously done on yeast proteasome.

=== Other regulatory particles ===
==== 11S ====
20S proteasomes can also associate with a second type of regulatory particle, the 11S regulatory particle, a heptameric structure that does not contain any ATPases and can promote the degradation of short peptides but not of complete proteins. It is presumed that this is because the complex cannot unfold larger substrates. This structure is also known as PA28, REG, or PA26. The mechanisms by which it binds to the core particle through the C-terminal tails of its subunits and induces α-ring conformational changes to open the 20S gate suggest a similar mechanism for the 19S particle. The expression of the 11S particle is induced by interferon gamma and is responsible, in conjunction with the immunoproteasome β subunits, for the generation of peptides that bind to the major histocompatibility complex.

==== BLM10/PA200 ====
Yet another type of non-ATPase regulatory particle is the Blm10 (yeast) or PA200/PSME4 (human). It opens only one α subunit in the 20S gate and itself folds into a dome with a very small pore over it.

==== Archaeal proteasomes ====
Archaea also contain a proteasome degradation pathway with a 20S core and a regulatory particle consisting of the Proteasome-Activating Nucleotidase (PAN), that shares similarities to the 19S proteasome. Like the eukaryotic 19S, PAN is a AAA-ATPase, containing N-terminal coiled coils, an OB ring, an ATPase domain with an HBXY motif that interacts with the archaeal 20S.

==== Bacterial proteasomes ====
Actinobacteria have acquired a proteasome degradation pathway, including its own 20S core particle and a AAA protein motor, MPA (mycobacterial proteasome activator). Unlike the base subcomplex of the 19S, MPA is a homohexameric motor complex, containing the ATPase sites, a tandem (oligosaccharide/oligonucleotide-binding) OB ring, and Coiled coils that extend off N-termini off the OB ring. The C-terminus contains HBXY motifs that contact the 20S core particle in a similar way as with other regulatory particles. Targeting to MPA requires a prokaryotic protein, Prokaryotic ubiquitin-like protein (or Pup) that functions as ubiquitin as a tag that can be attached to a protein substrate, though the structure of Pup is unrelated to that of ubiquitin. Once attached, a puplyated protein can be targeted to MPA through the coiled-coil and can be directed through the AAA motor into the 20S for degradation.

== Assembly ==
The assembly of the proteasome is a complex process due to the number of subunits that must associate to form an active complex. The β subunits are synthesized with N-terminal "propeptides" that are post-translationally modified during the assembly of the 20S particle to expose the proteolytic active site. The 20S particle is assembled from two half-proteasomes, each of which consists of a seven-membered pro-β ring attached to a seven-membered α ring. The association of the β rings of the two half-proteasomes triggers threonine-dependent autolysis of the propeptides to expose the active site. These β interactions are mediated mainly by salt bridges and hydrophobic interactions between conserved alpha helices whose disruption by mutation damages the proteasome's ability to assemble. The assembly of the half-proteasomes, in turn, is initiated by the assembly of the α subunits into their heptameric ring, forming a template for the association of the corresponding pro-β ring. The assembly of α subunits has not been characterized.

Only recently, the assembly process of the 19S regulatory particle has been elucidated to considerable extent. The 19S regulatory particle assembles as two distinct subcomponents, the base and the lid. Assembly of the base complex is facilitated by four assembly chaperones, Hsm3/S5b, Nas2/p27, Rpn14/PAAF1, and Nas6/gankyrin (names for yeast/mammals). These assembly chaperones bind to the AAA-ATPase subunits and their main function seems to be to ensure proper assembly of the heterohexameric AAA-ATPase ring. To date it is still under debate whether the base complex assembles separately, whether the assembly is templated by the 20S core particle, or whether alternative assembly pathways exist. In addition to the four assembly chaperones, the deubiquitinating enzyme Ubp6/Usp14 also promotes base assembly, but it is not essential. The lid assembles separately in a specific order and does not require assembly chaperones.

== Protein degradation process ==
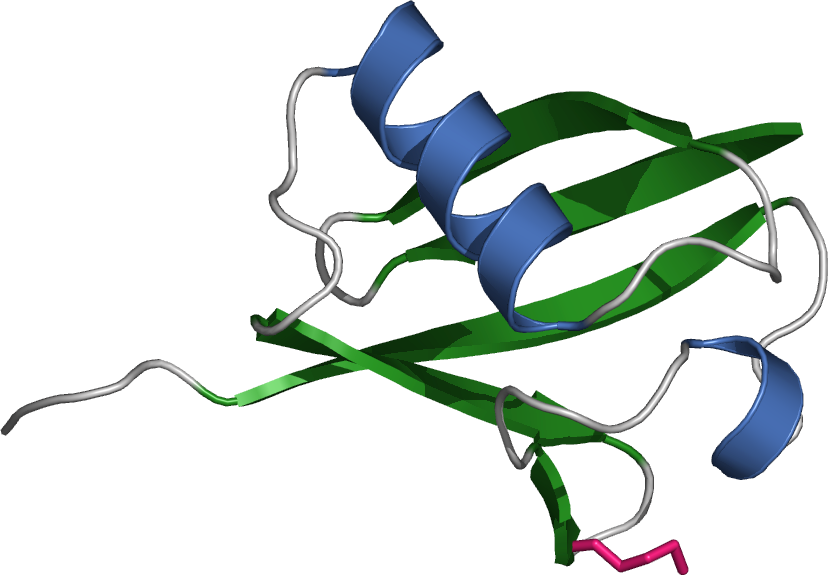
Ribbon diagram of ubiquitin, the highly conserved protein that serves as a molecular tag targeting proteins for degradation by the proteasome

=== Ubiquitination and targeting ===
Proteins are targeted for degradation by the proteasome with covalent modification of a lysine residue that requires the coordinated reactions of three enzymes. In the first step, a ubiquitin-activating enzyme (known as E1) hydrolyzes ATP and adenylylates a ubiquitin molecule. This is then transferred to E1's active-site cysteine residue in concert with the adenylylation of a second ubiquitin. This adenylylated ubiquitin is then transferred to a cysteine of a second enzyme, ubiquitin-conjugating enzyme (E2). In the last step, a member of a highly diverse class of enzymes known as ubiquitin ligases (E3) recognizes the specific protein to be ubiquitinated and catalyzes the transfer of ubiquitin from E2 to this target protein. A target protein must be labeled with at least four ubiquitin monomers (in the form of a polyubiquitin chain) before it is recognized by the proteasome lid. It is therefore the E3 that confers substrate specificity to this system. The number of E1, E2, and E3 proteins expressed depends on the organism and cell type, but there are many different E3 enzymes present in humans, indicating that there is a huge number of targets for the ubiquitin proteasome system.

The ubiquitin protein itself is 76 amino acids long and was named due to its ubiquitous nature, as it has a highly conserved sequence and is found in all known eukaryotic organisms. The genes encoding ubiquitin in eukaryotes are arranged in tandem repeats, possibly due to the heavy transcription demands on these genes to produce enough ubiquitin for the cell. It has been proposed that ubiquitin is the slowest-evolving protein identified to date. Ubiquitin contains seven lysine residues to which another ubiquitin can be ligated, resulting in different types of polyubiquitin chains. Chains in which each additional ubiquitin is linked to lysine 48 of the previous ubiquitin have a role in proteasome targeting, while other types of chains may be involved in other processes.

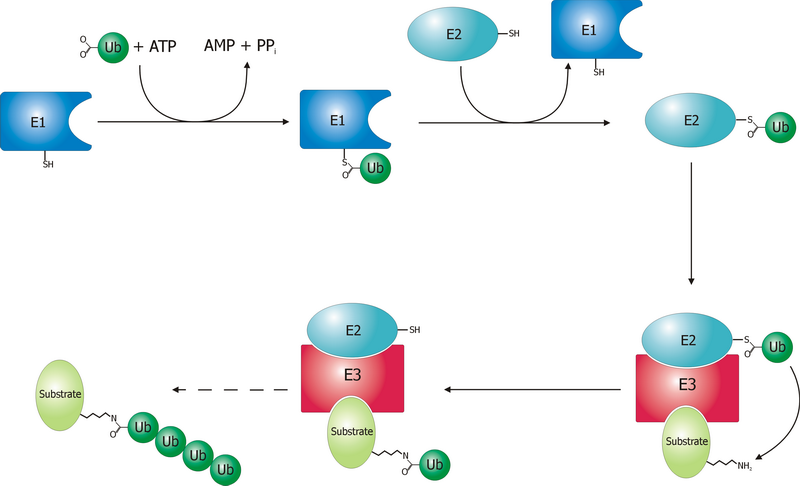
The ubiquitination pathway

==== Intrinsic Ubiquitin Receptors of the Proteasome ====
Polyubiquitinated proteins are targeted to the proteasome through three identified Ubiquitin receptors: Rpn1, Rpn10, and Rpn13, that decorate the 19S RP and can direct an unstructured region of the target substrate into the N-domain of the AAA motor. Each was identified individually and characterized to bind ubiquitin.

===== Rpn10 =====
Rpn10 was the first ubiquitin receptor identified on the proteasome. Rpn10 has a von Willebrand factor type A (VWA) attached to either a single Ubiquitin Interaction Motif (UIM), in yeast, or two UIMs in higher eukaryotes. The VWA domain binds between the base subcomplex and lid subcomplex of the 19S RP, while the UIM extends into a space over the AAA motor, though the UIM has not been seen in cryo-EM structures. NMR studies have shown that the UIM of Rpn10 binds mono-ubiquitin, and K48 di-ubiquitin with higher affinity. More recently, the C-terminus of Rpn10 in higher eukaryotes has been shown to bind an E3 ligase, UBE3A/E6AP (see Proteasomal Ligases).

===== Rpn13 =====
Rpn13 was identified as a ubiquitin receptor using a Yeast-2-hybrid screen. Ubiquitin binding to Rpn13 is through the pleckstrin-like receptor for the Ub (PRU) domain. and mutations to the PRU block binding to ubiquitin. Rpn13 binds the proteasome through Rpn2 and sits at the top of the 19S, positioned over the OB ring of the motor. Rpn13 also binds and activates a Deubiquitinating enzyme, UCH37 (see below).

===== Rpn1 =====
Ubiquitin binds Rpn1 via two sites, termed the T1 and T2 sites that were identified using NMR. Rpn1 also provides a docking site for Ubp6.

The affinities for ubiquitin for these receptors in isolation has been measured through a variety of methods. They are all in the micromolar range, however a substrate that has both a ubiquitin signal and an unstructured region has a Michaelis menten constant in the hundreds of nanomolar range, suggesting that the unstructured region in key in engaging a substrate.

Reported binding constants to Ubiquitin or K48 Ub2
Receptor	Ligand	Published Kd (method of measurement)	Reference
Rpn1	Ub	120 uM (NMR Nuclear magnetic resonance spectroscopy)	Shi Science 2016
Rpn1	K48 Ub_{2}	11 uM (NMR, ITC Isothermal Calorimetry)	Shi Science 2016
Rpn13	Ub	91 uM (SPR Surface plasmon resonance)	VanderLinden JBC2017
Rpn13	K48 Ub_{2}	29 uM(NMR) 37 uM (ITC)	Chen Structure 2016 VanderLinden JBC 2016
Rpn10 UIM	Ub	45 uM (NMR) 43 uM (SPR)	Chen Structure 2016
Rpn10 UIM	K48 Ub_{2}	13 uM (SPR)	Zhang Mol Cell 2009

===== Potential additional ubiquitin receptors. =====
Interestingly, mutations of Rpn1, Rpn10, and Rpn13 in yeast are not lethal, suggesting that additional sites may exist. The coiled-coil of Rpt4/5 has been proposed as a binding site by cross-linking mass spec and this has been visualized by cryo-EM.

=== Proteasomal deubiquitinases ===
Ubiquitin chains conjugated to a protein targeted for proteasomal degradation are normally removed by any one of the three proteasome-associated deubiquitylating enzymes (DUBs), which are Rpn11, Ubp6/USP14 and UCH37. Rpn11 is the essential DUB responsible for the en block removal of the ubiquitin signal from the substrate, while Ubp6/USP14 and UCH37 have been proposed to edit the ubiquitin code. Ubp6 knockouts in Saccharomyces cerevisiae are viable, and there is no homolog of UCH37 in budding yeast, though they exist in Schizosaccharomyces pombe and higher eukaryotes. This process recycles ubiquitin and is essential to maintain the ubiquitin reservoir in cells.

==== Rpn11 (POH1) ====
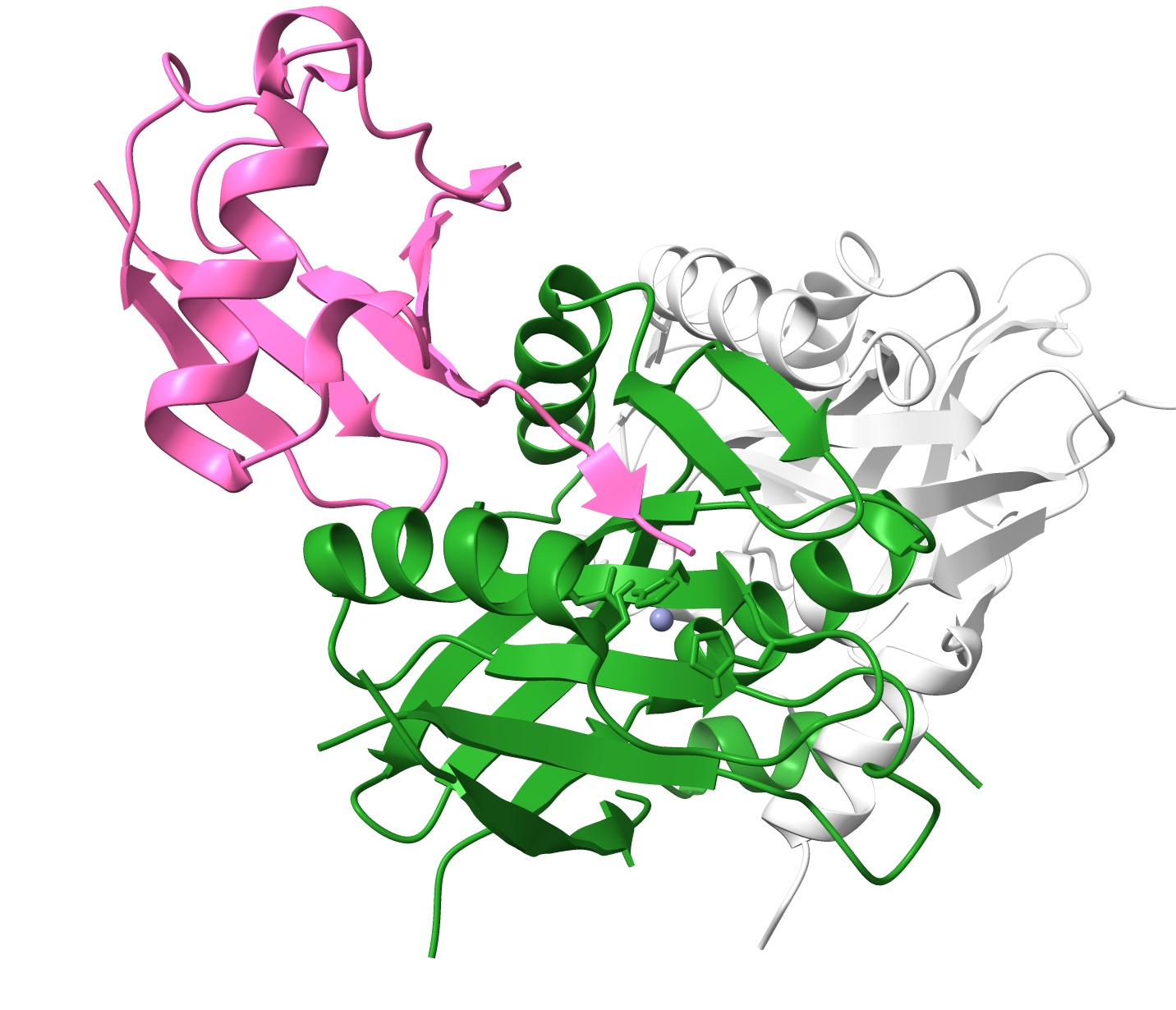
The crystal structure of yeast Rpn11/8 heterodimer bound to WT Ubiquitin. Rpn11 is in green, Rpn8 is in grey, and Ubiquitin is shown in pink.

Rpn11 is an intrinsic, stoichiometric subunit of the 19S regulatory particle and is essential for the function of 26S proteasome. Rpn11 is a zinc-dependent, metalloprotease of the JAB1/MPN/Mov34 metalloenzyme (JAMM) family of DUBs, that was identified to be the essential DUB responsible for the en block removal of the ubiquitin chain from the protein substrate. Rpn11 forms an obligate dimer with Rpn8 forming an active DUB able to cleave all ubiquitin linkages. The active site of Rpn11 is formed through metal coordination of the catalytic zinc and this site is covered by an Insert-1 loop that covers this active site. The structure is very similar to that of a related JAMM DUB, AMSH, that is responsible for K63 ubiquitin cleavage, however it lacks the residues that are key for AMSH's linkage specificity. The structure of Rpn11 bound to ubiquitin revealed that the C-terminus of Ubiquitin pushes the insert-1 loop into an beta-sheet providing access to the catalytic zinc. This structure combined with detailed biochemistry revealed that the DUB activity of Rpn11 was accelerated at least 10-fold by the translocation of the protein substrate, suggesting that the translocation delivered the Ub substrate to the active site of Rpn11. This model of translocation-dependent deubiquitination was later confirmed by cryoEM of both the yeast and human proteasome bound to a substrate, both of which recapitulated the crystal structure of Ubiquitin bound to Rpn11. Single molecule studies on the yeast proteasome confirmed that the DUB rates measured by biochemistry were indeed stimulated by translocation. More recent biochemical and single molecule studies have shown that on top of being the essential DUB, Rpn11 is also a ubiquitin receptor that acts as an allosteric sensor to enable proper engagement of a substrate by the proteasome.

In addition to binding Ubiquitin, Rpn11 has also recently been shown to be a binding spot for many proteasome associated factors. Three recent cryo-EM studies have shown that PITHD1 (Proteasome Interacting Thioredoxin Domain 1) and TXNL1 (Thioredoxin-like protein 1) bind the proteasome by binding Rpn2/Rpn10 and making an interaction with the insert-1 loop of Rpn11. PITHD1 binds the proteasome in a resting state and has been proposed to be a dormancy factor, while TXNL1 binds in a processing state, suggesting that it may have an active role in aiding protein degradation. Cryo-EM has also shown that Rpn11 can bind the Ubiquitin-like domain of midnolin, a protein that enables ubiquitin-independent degradation of transcription factors (see the section on ubiquitin-independent degradation).

==== USP14/UBP6 ====
In contrast to Rpn11, USP14 and UCH37 are the DUBs that do not always associated with the proteasome and are not essential for ubiquitin dependent degradation. Instead, these DUBs are proposed to "edit" the ubiquitin code of a substrate that is already engaged with the proteasome. In cells, about 10-40% of the proteasomes were found to have USP14 associated. Ubp6/USP14 is a member of the Ubiquitin Specific Protease (USP) family, utilizing a catalytic cysteine to cleave ubiquitin. Along with the USP, Ubp6/USP14 contains a Ubiquitin-like protein (UBL) that binds the proteasome. Ubp6/USP14 is largely activated by the proteasome and exhibit a very low DUB activity alone. Once activated, USP14 was found to suppress proteasome function by its DUB activity and by inducing parallel pathways of proteasome conformational transitions, one of which turned out to directly prohibit substrate insertion into the AAA-ATPase, as first observed biochemically and later confirmed by time-resolved cryogenic electron microscopy. It appears that USP14 regulates proteasome function at multiple checkpoints by both catalytically competing with Rpn11 and allosterically reprogramming the AAA-ATPase states, which is rather unexpected for a DUB. These observations imply that the proteasome regulation may depend on its dynamic transitions of conformational states.

==== UCH37 ====
UCH37 is a Ubiquitin C-terminal hydrolase that activated upon binding the 26S proteasome through the ubiquitin receptor Rpn13. UCH37 is activated upon binding the proteasome through the C-terminal DEUBAD (DUB adaptor) domain that binds Rpn2.

=== Proteasomal ligases ===
While Ubp6 and UCH37 can remodel the ubiquitin code on a substrate by removing Ubiquitins, Ubiquitin ligases can also associate with the proteasome and attach ubiquitins. For the 26S, this includes Hul5 in yeast (or UBE3C in humans) and UBE3A/E6AP in humans.

Hul5 was first identified in yeast as a 26S associated ligase along with Ubp6 and they were proposed to remodel ubiquitin chains at the proteasome. Biochemical studies show that Hul5 can attach additional ubiquitins onto a ubiquitinated substrate effectively acting as an Ubiquitin ligase. Hul5 has been proposed to bind Rpn2 in yeast, however this interaction has not been shown structurally. Further work needs to be done to understand how Hul5 works and what substrates are processed by Hul5.

UBE3A/E6AP binds the C-terminus of Rpn10 in mammals. NMR has shown that a previously described disordered region of Rpn10 becomes order upon binding E6AP forming a tight interaction in the low nanomolar range.

=== Proteasomal chaperones ===
In addition to DUBs and Ligases, many other proteins associate with the proteasome and are important for degradation. These proteins typically consist of a Ubiquitin-like domain (UBL) and a Ubiquitin associating domain (UBA) with Dsk2, Rad23, and Ddi1 being classified as Proteasomal Chaperones. Dsk2 and Rad23 have UBLs that bind the receptors of the proteasome. Ddi1 has been shown to bind long K48-Ubiquitin chains and act as a protease and is probably not directly interacting with the proteasome.

=== Unfolding and translocation ===
After a protein has been ubiquitinated, it is recognized by the 19S regulatory particle in an ATP-dependent binding step. The substrate protein must then enter the interior of the 20S subunit to come in contact with the proteolytic active sites. Because the 20S particle's central channel is narrow and gated by the N-terminal tails of the α ring subunits, the substrates must be at least partially unfolded before they enter the core. The passage of the unfolded substrate into the core is called translocation and necessarily occurs after deubiquitination. For an idealized substrate, translocation drives deubiquitination. However, the order in which substrates are deubiquitinated and unfolded is not yet clear. Which of these processes is the rate-limiting step in the overall proteolysis reaction depends on the specific substrate; for some proteins, the unfolding process is rate-limiting, while deubiquitination is the slowest step for other proteins. The extent to which substrates must be unfolded before translocation is suggested to be around 20 amino acid residues by the atomic structure of the substrate-engaged 26S proteasome in the deubiquitylation-compatible state, but substantial tertiary structure, and in particular nonlocal interactions such as disulfide bonds, are sufficient to inhibit degradation. The presence of intrinsically disordered protein segments of sufficient size, either at the protein terminus or internally, has also been proposed to facilitate efficient initiation of degradation.

The gate formed by the α subunits prevents peptides longer than about four residues from entering the interior of the 20S particle. The ATP molecules bound before the initial recognition step are hydrolyzed before translocation. While energy is needed for substrate unfolding, it is not required for translocation. The assembled 26S proteasome can degrade unfolded proteins in the presence of a non-hydrolyzable ATP analog, but cannot degrade folded proteins, indicating that energy from ATP hydrolysis is used for substrate unfolding. Passage of the unfolded substrate through the opened gate occurs via facilitated diffusion if the 19S cap is in the ATP-bound state.

The mechanism for unfolding of globular proteins is necessarily general, but somewhat dependent on the amino acid sequence. Long sequences of alternating glycine and alanine have been shown to inhibit substrate unfolding, decreasing the efficiency of proteasomal degradation; this results in the release of partially degraded byproducts, possibly due to the decoupling of the ATP hydrolysis and unfolding steps. Such glycine-alanine repeats are also found in nature, for example in silk fibroin; in particular, certain Epstein–Barr virus gene products bearing this sequence can stall the proteasome, helping the virus propagate by preventing antigen presentation on the major histocompatibility complex.

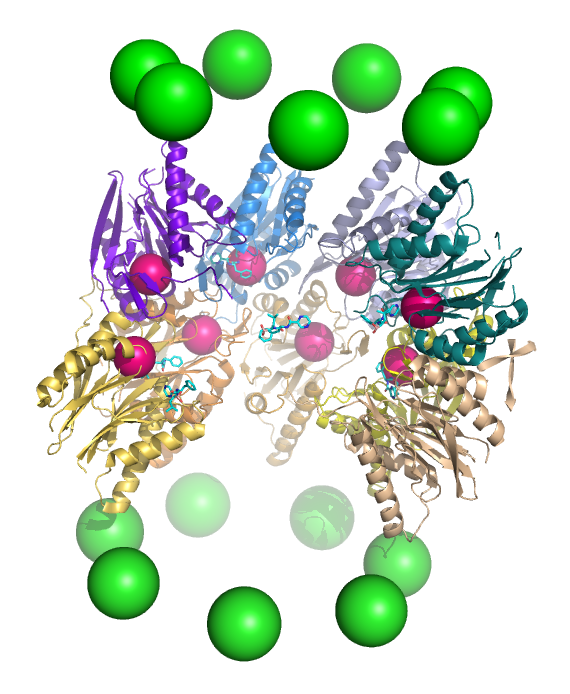
A cutaway view of the proteasome 20S core particle illustrating the locations of the active sites. The α subunits are represented as green spheres and the β subunits as protein backbones colored by individual polypeptide chain. The small pink spheres represent the location of the active-site threonine residue in each subunit. Light blue chemical structures are the inhibitor bortezomib bound to the active sites.

=== Proteolysis ===
The proteasome functions as an endoprotease. The mechanism of proteolysis by the β subunits of the 20S core particle is through a threonine-dependent nucleophilic attack. This mechanism may depend on an associated water molecule for deprotonation of the reactive threonine hydroxyl. Degradation occurs within the central chamber formed by the association of the two β rings and normally does not release partially degraded products, instead reducing the substrate to short polypeptides typically 7–9 residues long, though they can range from 4 to 25 residues, depending on the organism and substrate. The biochemical mechanism that determines product length is not fully characterized. Although the three catalytic β subunits have a common mechanism, they have slightly different substrate specificities, which are considered chymotrypsin-like, trypsin-like, and peptidyl-glutamyl peptide-hydrolyzing (PHGH)-like. These variations in specificity are the result of interatomic contacts with local residues near the active sites of each subunit. Each catalytic β subunit also possesses a conserved lysine residue required for proteolysis.

Although the proteasome normally produces very short peptide fragments, in some cases these products are themselves biologically active and functional molecules. Certain transcription factors regulating the expression of specific genes, including one component of the mammalian complex NF-κB, are synthesized as inactive precursors whose ubiquitination and subsequent proteasomal degradation converts them to an active form. Such activity requires the proteasome to cleave the substrate protein internally, rather than processively degrading it from one terminus. It has been suggested that long loops on these proteins' surfaces serve as the proteasomal substrates and enter the central cavity, while the majority of the protein remains outside. Similar effects have been observed in yeast proteins; this mechanism of selective degradation is known as regulated ubiquitin/proteasome dependent processing (RUP).

=== Ubiquitin-independent degradation ===
Although most substrates must be ubiquitinated before being degraded by the 26S proteasome, there are some exceptions to this general rule, especially when the proteasome plays a normal role in the post-translational processing of the protein. The proteasomal activation of NF-κB by processing p105 into p50 via internal proteolysis is one major example. Some proteins that are hypothesized to be unstable due to intrinsically unstructured regions, are degraded in a ubiquitin-independent manner. Ubiquitin-independent mechanisms targeting key cell cycle regulators such as p53 have also been reported, although p53 is also subject to ubiquitin-dependent degradation. Finally, structurally abnormal, misfolded, or highly oxidized proteins are also subject to ubiquitin-independent and 19S-independent degradation under conditions of cellular stress.

The most well-known example of a ubiquitin-independent proteasome substrate is the enzyme ornithine decarboxylase (ODC). ODC is degraded upon the expression and binding to a cofactor, Ornithine decarboxylase antizyme (AZ) that breaks the ODC dimer. ODC contains either a C-terminal disordered region (in human) or an N-terminal disordered region (in yeast) is necessary for degradation and is proposed to engage the AAA motor of the 19S RP, however the mechanistic details of this interaction have yet to be identified. Another example of ubiquitin independent degradation is Thymidine synthetase, where an N-terminal disordered region is essential for degradation.

FAT10 (or Ubiquitin D) is a tandem UBL protein that is also degraded by the proteasome in a ubiquitin independent manner. Recent biochemical and structural studies show that FAT10 is degraded upon binding of NUB1 that unfolds the first UBL of FAT10 enabling engagement by the 26S proteasome. The NUB1-FAT10 complex also exposes a UBL on NUB1 that binds Rpn1, positioning FAT10 above the central channel of the proteasome. Midnolin was identified as a protein that targeted transcription factors to the proteasome for ubiquitin independent degradation. Recent structural studies show that the UBL of midnolin binds Rpn11, a helix binds Rpn1, and the CATCH domain binds the transcription factor, providing a model for how ubiquitin independent degradation occurs.

Pathogens also have learned to take advantage of ubiquitin-independent degradation. For plants, a parasitic Phytoplasma, expresses SAP05, a protein that binds transcription factors and target them for degradation by the 26S proteasome by binding the VWA domain of Rpn10. Interestingly, SAP05 does not bind the insect vector Rpn10. Crystal structures show how SAP05 binds both these TFs and Rpn10 indicating that SAP05 places the TFs near the entry of the AAA motor allowing for ubiquitin independent degradation.

== Evolution ==
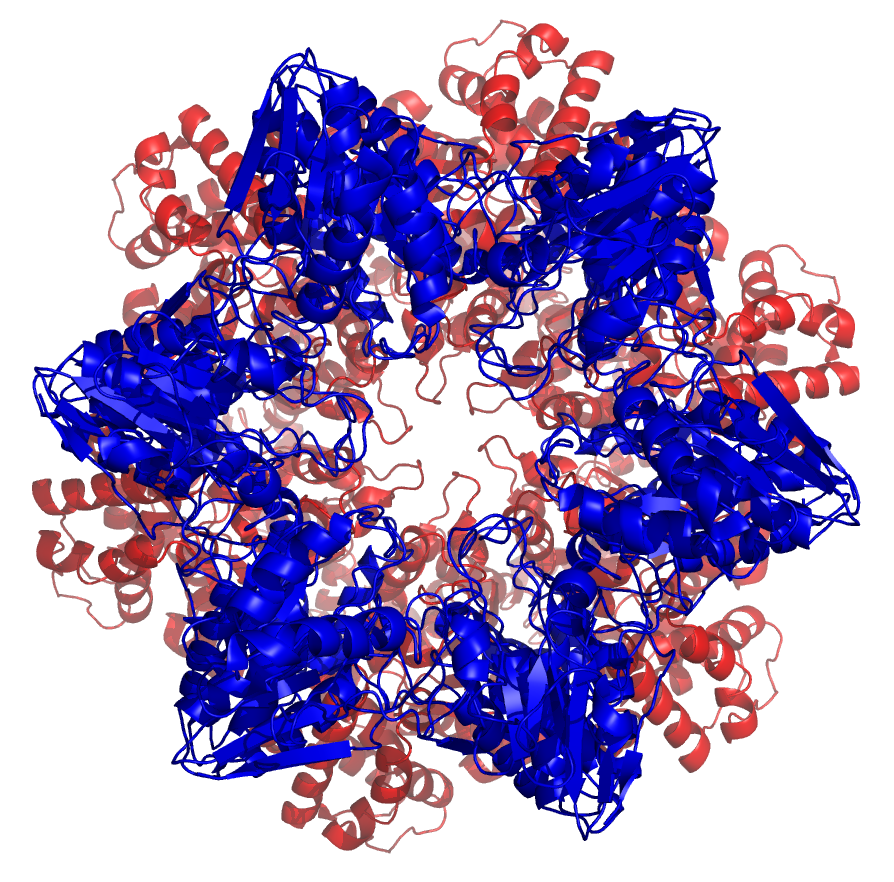
The assembled complex of hslV (blue) and hslU (red) from E. coli. This complex of heat shock proteins is thought to resemble the ancestor of the modern proteasome.

The 20S proteasome is both ubiquitous and essential in eukaryotes and archaea. The bacterial order Actinomycetales, also share homologs of the 20S proteasome, whereas most bacteria possess heat shock genes hslV and hslU, whose gene products are a multimeric protease arranged in a two-layered ring and an ATPase. The hslV protein has been hypothesized to resemble the likely ancestor of the 20S proteasome. In general, HslV is not essential in bacteria, and not all bacteria possess it, whereas some protists possess both the 20S and the hslV systems. Many bacteria also possess other homologs of the proteasome and an associated ATPase, most notably ClpP and ClpX. This redundancy explains why the HslUV system is not essential.

Sequence analysis suggests that the catalytic β subunits diverged earlier in evolution than the predominantly structural α subunits. In bacteria that express a 20S proteasome, the β subunits have high sequence identity to archaeal and eukaryotic β subunits, whereas the α sequence identity is much lower. The presence of 20S proteasomes in bacteria may result from lateral gene transfer, while the diversification of subunits among eukaryotes is ascribed to multiple gene duplication events.

== Cell cycle control ==
Cell cycle progression is controlled by ordered action of cyclin-dependent kinases (CDKs), activated by specific cyclins that demarcate phases of the cell cycle. Mitotic cyclins, which persist in the cell for only a few minutes, have one of the shortest life spans of all intracellular proteins. After a CDK-cyclin complex has performed its function, the associated cyclin is polyubiquitinated and destroyed by the proteasome, which provides directionality for the cell cycle. In particular, exit from mitosis requires the proteasome-dependent dissociation of the regulatory component cyclin B from the mitosis promoting factor complex. In vertebrate cells, "slippage" through the mitotic checkpoint leading to premature M phase exit can occur despite the delay of this exit by the spindle checkpoint.

Earlier cell cycle checkpoints such as post-restriction point check between G_{1} phase and S phase similarly involve proteasomal degradation of cyclin A, whose ubiquitination is promoted by the anaphase promoting complex (APC), an E3 ubiquitin ligase. The APC and the Skp1/Cul1/F-box protein complex (SCF complex) are the two key regulators of cyclin degradation and checkpoint control; the SCF itself is regulated by the APC via ubiquitination of the adaptor protein, Skp2, which prevents SCF activity before the G1-S transition.

Individual components of the 19S particle have their own regulatory roles. Gankyrin, a recently identified oncoprotein, is one of the 19S subcomponents that also tightly binds the cyclin-dependent kinase CDK4 and plays a key role in recognizing ubiquitinated p53, via its affinity for the ubiquitin ligase MDM2. Gankyrin is anti-apoptotic and has been shown to be overexpressed in some tumor cell types such as hepatocellular carcinoma.

Like eukaryotes, some archaea also use the proteasome to control cell cycle, specifically by controlling ESCRT-III-mediated cell division.

=== Regulation of plant growth ===
In plants, signaling by auxins, or phytohormones that order the direction and tropism of plant growth, induces the targeting of a class of transcription factor repressors known as Aux/IAA proteins for proteasomal degradation. These proteins are ubiquitinated by SCFTIR1, or SCF in complex with the auxin receptor TIR1. Degradation of Aux/IAA proteins derepresses transcription factors in the auxin-response factor (ARF) family and induces ARF-directed gene expression. The cellular consequences of ARF activation depend on the plant type and developmental stage, but are involved in directing growth in roots and leaf veins. The specific response to ARF derepression is thought to be mediated by specificity in the pairing of individual ARF and Aux/IAA proteins.

=== Apoptosis ===
Both internal and external signals can lead to the induction of apoptosis, or programmed cell death. The resulting deconstruction of cellular components is primarily carried out by specialized proteases known as caspases, but the proteasome also plays important and diverse roles in the apoptotic process. The involvement of the proteasome in this process is indicated by both the increase in protein ubiquitination, and of E1, E2, and E3 enzymes that is observed well in advance of apoptosis. During apoptosis, proteasomes localized to the nucleus have also been observed to translocate to outer membrane blebs characteristic of apoptosis.

Proteasome inhibition has different effects on apoptosis induction in different cell types. In general, the proteasome is not required for apoptosis, although inhibiting it is pro-apoptotic in most cell types that have been studied. Apoptosis is mediated through disrupting the regulated degradation of pro-growth cell cycle proteins. However, some cell lines — in particular, primary cultures of quiescent and differentiated cells such as thymocytes and neurons — are prevented from undergoing apoptosis on exposure to proteasome inhibitors. The mechanism for this effect is not clear, but is hypothesized to be specific to cells in quiescent states, or to result from the differential activity of the pro-apoptotic kinase JNK. The ability of proteasome inhibitors to induce apoptosis in rapidly dividing cells has been exploited in several recently developed chemotherapy agents such as bortezomib and salinosporamide A.

== Response to cellular stress ==
In response to cellular stresses – such as infection, heat shock, or oxidative damage – heat shock proteins that identify misfolded or unfolded proteins and target them for proteasomal degradation are expressed. Both Hsp27 and Hsp90—chaperone proteins have been implicated in increasing the activity of the ubiquitin-proteasome system, though they are not direct participants in the process. Hsp70, on the other hand, binds exposed hydrophobic patches on the surface of misfolded proteins and recruits E3 ubiquitin ligases such as CHIP to tag the proteins for proteasomal degradation. The CHIP protein (carboxyl terminus of Hsp70-interacting protein) is itself regulated via inhibition of interactions between the E3 enzyme CHIP and its E2 binding partner.

Similar mechanisms exist to promote the degradation of oxidatively damaged proteins via the proteasome system. In particular, proteasomes localized to the nucleus are regulated by PARP and actively degrade inappropriately oxidized histones. Oxidized proteins, which often form large amorphous aggregates in the cell, can be degraded directly by the 20S core particle without the 19S regulatory cap and do not require ATP hydrolysis or tagging with ubiquitin. However, high levels of oxidative damage increases the degree of cross-linking between protein fragments, rendering the aggregates resistant to proteolysis. Larger numbers and sizes of such highly oxidized aggregates are associated with aging.

Dysregulation of the ubiquitin proteasome system may contribute to several neural diseases. It may lead to brain tumors such as astrocytomas. In some of the late-onset neurodegenerative diseases that share aggregation of misfolded proteins as a common feature, such as Parkinson's disease and Alzheimer's disease, large insoluble aggregates of misfolded proteins can form and then result in neurotoxicity, through mechanisms that are not yet well understood. Decreased proteasome activity has been suggested as a cause of aggregation and Lewy body formation in Parkinson's. This hypothesis is supported by the observation that yeast models of Parkinson's are more susceptible to toxicity from α-synuclein, the major protein component of Lewy bodies, under conditions of low proteasome activity. Impaired proteasomal activity may underlie cognitive disorders such as the autism spectrum disorders, and muscle and nerve diseases such as inclusion body myopathy.

== Role in the immune system ==
The proteasome plays a straightforward but critical role in the function of the adaptive immune system. Peptide antigens are displayed by the major histocompatibility complex class I (MHC) proteins on the surface of antigen-presenting cells. These peptides are products of proteasomal degradation of proteins originated by the invading pathogen. Although constitutively expressed proteasomes can participate in this process, a specialized complex composed of proteins, whose expression is induced by interferon gamma, are the primary producers of peptides which are optimal in size and composition for MHC binding. These proteins whose expression increases during the immune response include the 11S regulatory particle, whose main known biological role is regulating the production of MHC ligands, and specialized β subunits called β1i, β2i, and β5i with altered substrate specificity. The complex formed with the specialized β subunits is known as the immunoproteasome. Another β5i variant subunit, β5t, is expressed in the thymus, leading to a thymus-specific "thymoproteasome" whose function is as yet unclear.

The strength of MHC class I ligand binding is dependent on the composition of the ligand C-terminus, as peptides bind by hydrogen bonding and by close contacts with a region called the "B pocket" on the MHC surface. Many MHC class I alleles prefer hydrophobic C-terminal residues, and the immunoproteasome complex is more likely to generate hydrophobic C-termini.

Due to its role in generating the activated form of NF-κB, an anti-apoptotic and pro-inflammatory regulator of cytokine expression, proteasomal activity has been linked to inflammatory and autoimmune diseases. Increased levels of proteasome activity correlate with disease activity and have been implicated in autoimmune diseases including systemic lupus erythematosus and rheumatoid arthritis.

The proteasome is also involved in Intracellular antibody-mediated proteolysis of antibody-bound virions. In this neutralisation pathway, TRIM21 (a protein of the tripartite motif family) binds with immunoglobulin G to direct the virion to the proteasome where it is degraded.

== Proteasome inhibitors ==
Chemical structure of bortezomib (Boronated form of MG132), a proteasome inhibitor used in chemotherapy that is particularly effective against multiple myeloma

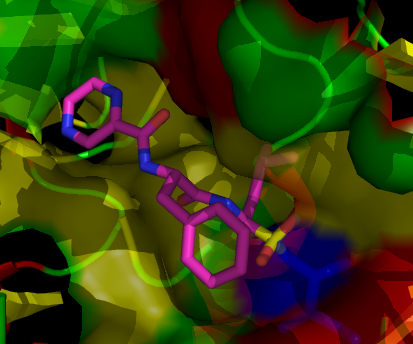
Bortezomib bound to the core particle in a yeast proteasome. The bortezomib molecule is in the center colored by atom type (carbon = pink, nitrogen = blue, oxygen = red, boron = yellow), surrounded by the local protein surface. The blue patch is the catalytic threonine residue whose activity is blocked by the presence of bortezomib.

Proteasome inhibitors have effective anti-tumor activity in cell culture, inducing apoptosis by disrupting the regulated degradation of pro-growth cell cycle proteins. This approach of selectively inducing apoptosis in tumor cells has proven effective in animal models and human trials.

Lactacystin, a natural product synthesized by Streptomyces bacteria, was the first non-peptidic proteasome inhibitor discovered and is widely used as a research tool in biochemistry and cell biology. Lactacystin was licensed to Myogenics/Proscript, which was acquired by Millennium Pharmaceuticals, now part of Takeda Pharmaceuticals. Lactacystin covalently modifies the amino-terminal threonine of catalytic β subunits of the proteasome, particularly the β5 subunit responsible for the proteasome's chymotrypsin-like activity. This discovery helped to establish the proteasome as a mechanistically novel class of protease: an amino-terminal threonine protease.

Bortezomib (Boronated MG132), a molecule developed by Millennium Pharmaceuticals and marketed as Velcade, is the first proteasome inhibitor to reach clinical use as a chemotherapy agent. Bortezomib is used in the treatment of multiple myeloma. Notably, multiple myeloma has been observed to result in increased proteasome-derived peptide levels in blood serum that decrease to normal levels in response to successful chemotherapy. Studies in animals have indicated that bortezomib may also have clinically significant effects in pancreatic cancer. Preclinical and early clinical studies have been started to examine bortezomib's effectiveness in treating other B-cell-related cancers, particularly some types of non-Hodgkin's lymphoma. Clinical results also seem to justify use of proteasome inhibitor combined with chemotherapy, for B-cell acute lymphoblastic leukemia Proteasome inhibitors can kill some types of cultured leukemia cells that are resistant to glucocorticoids.

The molecule ritonavir, marketed as Norvir, was developed as a protease inhibitor and used to target HIV infection. However, it has been shown to inhibit proteasomes as well as free proteases; to be specific, the chymotrypsin-like activity of the proteasome is inhibited by ritonavir, while the trypsin-like activity is somewhat enhanced. Studies in animal models suggest that ritonavir may have inhibitory effects on the growth of glioma cells.

Proteasome inhibitors have also shown promise in treating autoimmune diseases in animal models. For example, studies in mice bearing human skin grafts found a reduction in the size of lesions from psoriasis after treatment with a proteasome inhibitor. Inhibitors also show positive effects in rodent models of asthma.

Labeling and inhibition of the proteasome is also of interest in laboratory settings for both in vitro and in vivo study of proteasomal activity in cells. The most commonly used laboratory inhibitors are lactacystin and the peptide aldehyde MG132 initially developed by Goldberg lab. Fluorescent inhibitors have also been developed to specifically label the active sites of the assembled proteasome.

== Clinical significance ==
The proteasome and its subunits are of clinical significance for at least two reasons: (1) a compromised complex assembly or a dysfunctional proteasome can be associated with the underlying pathophysiology of specific diseases, and (2) they can be exploited as drug targets for therapeutic interventions. More recently, more effort has been made to consider the proteasome for the development of novel diagnostic markers and strategies. An improved and comprehensive understanding of the pathophysiology of the proteasome should lead to clinical applications in the future.

The proteasomes form a pivotal component for the ubiquitin–proteasome system (UPS) and corresponding cellular Protein Quality Control (PQC). Protein ubiquitination and subsequent proteolysis and degradation by the proteasome are important mechanisms in the regulation of the cell cycle, cell growth and differentiation, gene transcription, signal transduction and apoptosis. Proteasome defects lead to reduced proteolytic activity and the accumulation of damaged or misfolded proteins, which may contribute to neurodegenerative disease, cardiovascular diseases, inflammatory responses and autoimmune diseases, and systemic DNA damage responses leading to malignancies.

Research has implicated UPS defects in the pathogenesis of neurodegenerative and myodegenerative disorders, including Alzheimer's disease, Parkinson's disease and Pick's disease, amyotrophic lateral sclerosis (ALS), Huntington's disease, Creutzfeldt–Jakob disease, and motor neuron diseases, polyglutamine (PolyQ) diseases, muscular dystrophies and several rare forms of neurodegenerative diseases associated with dementia. As part of the ubiquitin–proteasome system (UPS), the proteasome maintains cardiac protein homeostasis and thus plays a significant role in cardiac ischemic injury, ventricular hypertrophy and heart failure. Additionally, evidence is accumulating that the UPS plays an essential role in malignant transformation. UPS proteolysis plays a major role in responses of cancer cells to stimulatory signals that are critical for the development of cancer. Accordingly, gene expression by degradation of transcription factors, such as p53, c-jun, c-Fos, NF-κB, c-Myc, HIF-1α, MATα2, STAT3, sterol-regulated element-binding proteins and androgen receptors are all controlled by the UPS and thus involved in the development of various malignancies. Moreover, the UPS regulates the degradation of tumor suppressor gene products such as adenomatous polyposis coli (APC) in colorectal cancer, retinoblastoma (Rb). and von Hippel–Lindau tumor suppressor (VHL), as well as a number of proto-oncogenes (Raf, Myc, Myb, Rel, Src, Mos, ABL). The UPS is also involved in the regulation of inflammatory responses. This activity is usually attributed to the role of proteasomes in the activation of NF-κB which further regulates the expression of pro inflammatory cytokines such as TNF-α, IL-β, IL-8, adhesion molecules (ICAM-1, VCAM-1, P-selectin) and prostaglandins and nitric oxide (NO). Additionally, the UPS also plays a role in inflammatory responses as regulators of leukocyte proliferation, mainly through proteolysis of cyclines and the degradation of CDK inhibitors. Lastly, autoimmune disease patients with SLE, Sjögren syndrome and rheumatoid arthritis (RA) predominantly exhibit circulating proteasomes which can be applied as clinical biomarkers.

== See also ==
- The Proteolysis Map
- DSS1/SEM1 protein family
- Exosome complex
- Endoplasmic-reticulum-associated protein degradation
- JUNQ and IPOD
