= Thymoproteasome =

Immunity, proteasome, thymus, T cells

Thymoproteasome is a special kind of proteasome, which is present in vertebrates. In the body it is located in thymus, exclusively in cortical thymic epithelial cells (cTECs). But in thymus we can also find another type of specific proteasome, immunoproteasome, which is present in thymocytes, dendritic cells and medular thymic epithelial cells. It was first described in 2007 during a search for non-intronic sequence proximal to PSMB5 locus in mouse genome. The PSMB5 locus encodes the standard β5 proteasome subunit, while this sequence encodes a variant subunit β5t (PSMB11) specific to thymoproteasome. The importance of this protein complex is its involvement in positive selection of T cells.

Generally proteasomes are protein complexes in cells, which degrade proteins marked by ubiquitin systems. Proteasomes are present in all eukaryotes. It has been shown that there exist modifications, which have different catalytic subunits. The first type of proteasome which was described is immunoproteasome, which is present in all jawed vertebrates. Its function is degrading proteins for presentation on the surface of plasmatic membrane bound to MHC I complex. Immunoproteasome is activated when cells detect pro-inflammatory stimuli such as interferon gamma or other pro-inflammatory cytokines. The next type is thymoproteasome, which is involved in degradation of proteins, whose fragments are then presented to T cells in thymus.

== Structure ==
Proteasomes consist of 20S catalytic core, which itself is created from two outer rings of alpha subunits and two inner rings of beta subunits. The catalytic activity is possessed only by β1, β2 and β5 subunits. In the basic type of proteasome these subunits have caspase, trypsin-like and chymotrypsin-like activities respectively. To form the complete proteasome two 19S regulatory complexes are attached to both sides of the 20S core. This whole complex, designed as 26S, is then fully functional.

In thymoproteasome the catalytic subunits are replaced by their variants β1i, β2i and β5t. The first two subunits are also present in immunoproteasome, while the last one is specific to thymoproteasome. The β5t subunit active proteolytic center contains mostly hydrophilic amino acid residues. In contrast both the β5 and β5i subunits contain mostly hydrophobic residues. This change leads to their different proteolytic activities and thus to specific protein fragment production. β5t subunit also creates different S1 pockets, which determine the C-terminus of the processed peptide. This leads to decrease in chymotrypsin-like activity without affecting the trypsin-like and caspase-like activities. Thymoproteasome produces different sequences and quantities of peptides due to the β5t subunit.

Duplication of the original proteasome gene is the most likely mechanism of the development of specific subunits (β5t/i). Those duplications may have played a role in the development of adaptive immunity.

== Function ==
The function of thymoproteasome is the cleavage of proteins to peptides for display in the MHC I complex. These peptides serve in thymus during the positive selection of CD8+ T lymphocytes. The thymoproteasome is capable of providing unique self, MHC-associated peptides, or the self-peptides that vary from conventional self-peptides expressed in other parts of the body.

β5t deficient mice were used to study the function of thymoproteasome. Such mice developed thymuses as large as healthy mice, but their cTECs no longer contained thymoproteasomes. In these mice it was replaced by immunoproteasome, which did not replicate its function sufficiently. This then decreased their CD8+ T lymphocyte count by about 20%, which shows the important role of thymoproteasome in T cell development.

In a knockout model of nude mice with deficiency of Foxn-1 gene it is obvious that Foxn1 transcriptional factor is involved in specific expression of β5t in thymus. Its promoter (with sequence 5′ -ACGC-3′) is highly conserved to Foxn1 transcriptional factor. Mutation in this promoter leads to decrease in β5t expression and CD8+ T cells production.

== β5t subunit in diagnostic of thymic epithelilal tumors ==
Thymic epithelial tumors form a group of six categories (A, AB, B1, B2, B3 and C), which are based on its histology and morphology. Diagnostic of those tumors is problematic because of their rarity and variablitity in the cytological and structural patterns. Above-mentioned Foxn1 was used as a marker, but there is a problem of it appearing in other tumors like lungs carcinome. Recent research into β5t subunit has shown, that it can be used as a diagnostic marker of some categories of thymic epithelial tumors. β5t subunit is expressed the most in the B type of tumors, less so in AB and not at all expressed in the A type.
