= HslVU =

Class of bacterial heat shock proteins

HslU—HslV peptidase
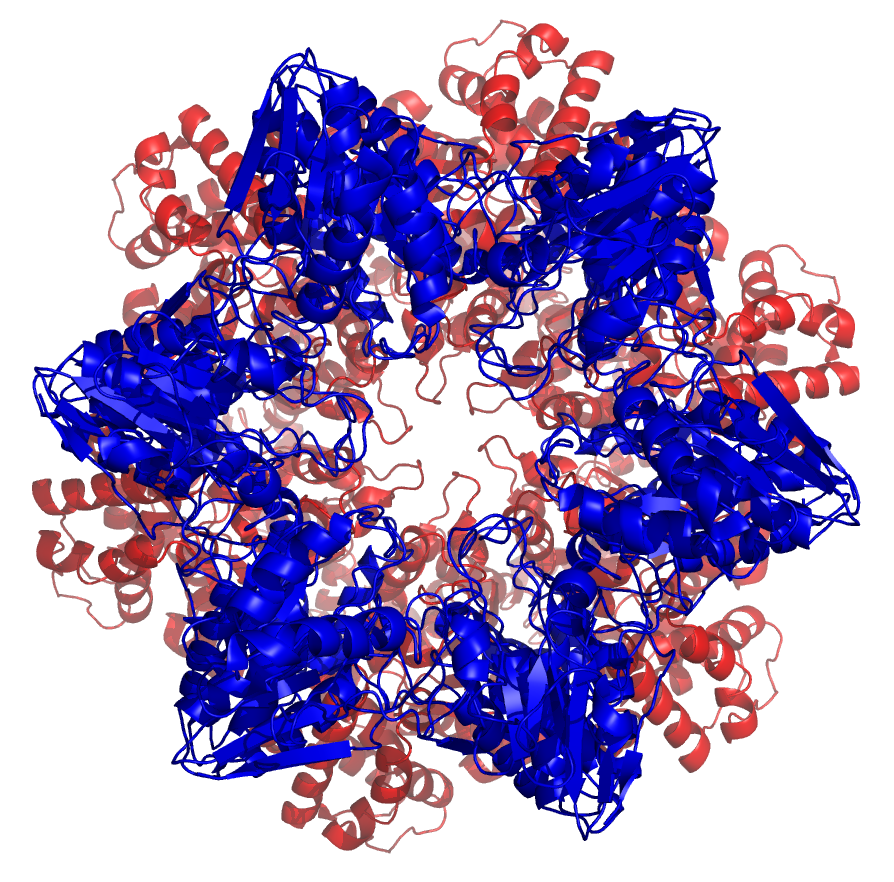
- Top view of the hslV/hslU complex isolated from E. coli (PDB ID 1G4A).

Identifiers
- EC no.: 3.4.25.2

Databases
- BRENDA: enzyme data
- ExPASy: NiceZyme view
- KEGG: enzyme entry
- MetaCyc: metabolic pathway
- Rhea: reactions
- PDB structures: RCSB PDB PDBe PDBsum
Search
- PMC: articles
- PubMed: articles
- NCBI: proteins

Heat shock protein HslU

Identifiers
- Symbol: HslU
- InterPro: IPR004491
Available protein structures:
- PDB: IPR004491
- AlphaFold: IPR004491

ATP-dependent protease, HslV subunit

Identifiers
- Symbol: HslV
- InterPro: IPR022281
Available protein structures:
- PDB: IPR022281
- AlphaFold: IPR022281

The heat shock proteins HslV and HslU (HslVU complex; also known as ClpQ and ClpY respectively, or ClpQY) are expressed in many bacteria such as E. coli in response to cell stress. The hslV protein is a protease and the hslU protein is an ATPase; the two form a symmetric assembly of four stacked rings, consisting of an hslV dodecamer bound to an hslU hexamer, with a central pore in which the protease and ATPase active sites reside. The hslV protein degrades unneeded or damaged proteins only when in complex with the hslU protein in the ATP-bound state. HslV is thought to resemble the hypothetical ancestor of the proteasome, a large protein complex specialized for regulated degradation of unneeded proteins in eukaryotes, many archaea, and a few bacteria. HslV bears high similarity to core subunits of proteasomes.

== Genetics ==
Both proteins are encoded on the same operon within the bacterial genome. Unlike many eukaryotic proteasomes, which have several different peptide substrate specificities, hslV has a specificity similar to that of chymotrypsin; hence it is inhibited by proteasome inhibitors that specifically target the chymotrypsin site in eukaryotic proteasomes. Although the HslVU complex is stable on its own, some evidence suggests that the complex is formed in vivo in a substrate-induced manner due to a conformational change in the hslU-substrate complex that promotes hslV binding.

HslV and hslU genes have also been identified in some eukaryotes, although these also require the constitutively expressed proteasome for survival. These eukaryotic HslVU complexes assemble to apparently functional units, suggesting that these eukaryotes have both functional proteasomes and functional hslVU systems.

== Regulation ==
The promoter region of the operon encoding HslU and HslV contains a stem-loop structure which is necessary for gene expression. This structure contributes to mRNA stability.

== Motifs in peptide unfolding ==
A four-amino acid sequence motif - GYVG, glycine-tyrosine-valine-glycine - conserved in hslU ATPases and located on the inner surface of the assembled pore dramatically accelerates the degradation of some proteins, and is required for the degradation of others. However, these motifs are not necessary for the degradation of short peptides and play no direct role in hydrolysis, suggesting that their major role is in unfolding the native state structure of the substrate and transferring the resulting disordered polypeptide chain to the hslV subunits for degradation. These motifs also influence the assembly of the complex. Translocation is also facilitated by the C-terminal tails of the HslU subunits, which form a gate closing off the proteolytic active sites in the central pore until a substrate has been bound and unfolded.

== Mechanism ==
The basic mechanism by which the hslVU complex undertakes proteolytic substrate degradation is essentially the same as that observed in the eukaryotic proteasome, catalyzed by Nactive-site threonine residues. Both are members of the T1 family. It is inhibited by enzyme inhibitors that covalently bind the threonine. Like the proteasome, hslU must bind ATP in a magnesium-dependent manner before substrate binding and unfolding can occur.
