= CAMP-dependent pathway =

Signal cascade used for cell to cell communication

In the field of molecular biology, the cAMP-dependent pathway, also known as the adenylyl cyclase pathway, is a G protein-coupled receptor-triggered signaling cascade used in cell communication.

== Discovery ==
cAMP was discovered by Earl Sutherland and Ted Rall in the mid 1950s. cAMP is considered a secondary messenger along with Ca^{2+}. Sutherland won the Nobel Prize in 1971 for his discovery of the mechanism of action of epinephrine in glycogenolysis, that requires cAMP as secondary messenger.

== Mechanism ==
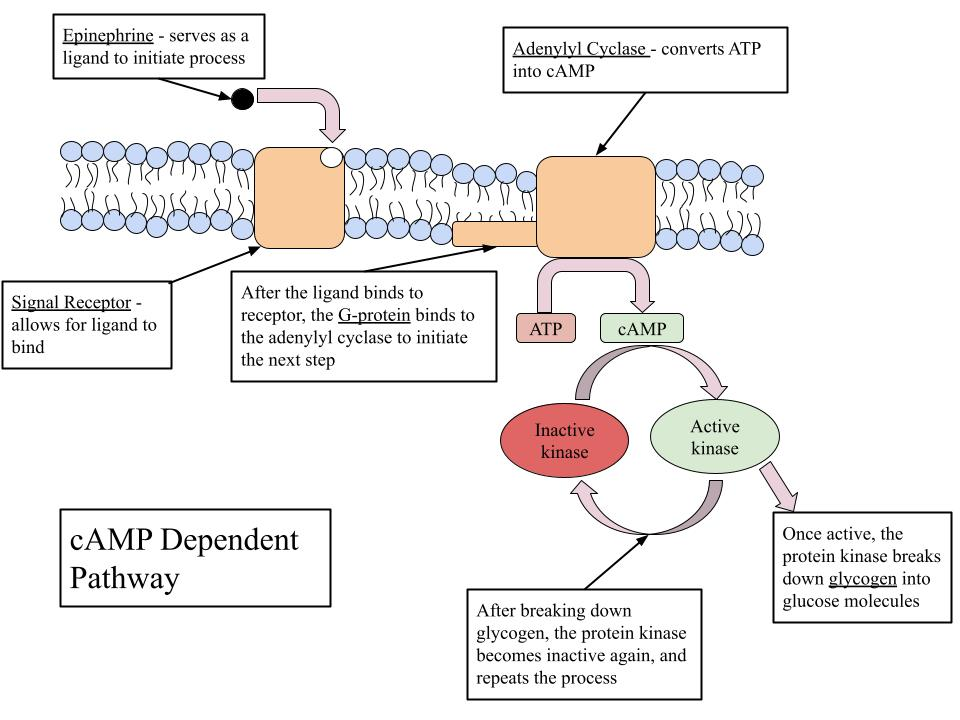
The cAMP-dependent pathway is a signal transduction mechanism in which the binding of a ligand to a G protein-coupled receptor activates adenylate cyclase, increasing cAMP levels and activating protein kinase to regulate cellular responses.

G protein-coupled receptors (GPCRs) are a large family of integral membrane proteins that respond to a variety of extracellular stimuli. Each GPCR binds to and is activated by a specific ligand stimulus that ranges in size from small molecule catecholamines, lipids, or neurotransmitters to large protein hormones. When a GPCR is activated by its extracellular ligand, a conformational change is induced in the receptor that is transmitted to an attached intracellular heterotrimeric G protein complex. The G_{s} alpha subunit of the stimulated G protein complex exchanges GDP for GTP and is released from the complex.

In a cAMP-dependent pathway, the activated G_{s} alpha subunit binds to and activates an enzyme called adenylyl cyclase, which, in turn, catalyzes the conversion of ATP into cyclic adenosine monophosphate (cAMP). Increases in concentration of the second messenger cAMP may lead to the activation of

- cyclic nucleotide-gated ion channels
- exchange proteins activated by cAMP (EPAC) such as RAPGEF3
- popeye domain containing proteins (Popdc)
- an enzyme called protein kinase A (PKA).

The PKA enzyme is also known as cAMP-dependent enzyme because it gets activated only if cAMP is present. Once PKA is activated, it phosphorylates a number of other proteins including:

- enzymes that convert glycogen into glucose
- enzymes that promote muscle contraction in the heart leading to an increase in heart rate
- transcription factors, which regulate gene expression
- also phosphorylate AMPA receptors

Specificity of signaling between a GPCR and its ultimate molecular target through a cAMP-dependent pathway may be achieved through formation of a multiprotein complex that includes the GPCR, adenylyl cyclase, and the effector protein.

== Importance ==
In humans, cAMP works by activating protein kinase A (PKA, cAMP-dependent protein kinase), one of the first few kinases discovered. It has four sub-units two catalytic and two regulatory. cAMP binds to the regulatory sub-units. It causes them to break apart from the catalytic sub-units. The catalytic sub-units make their way in to the nucleus to influence transcription. Further effects mainly depend on cAMP-dependent protein kinase, which vary based on the type of cell.

cAMP-dependent pathway is necessary for many living organisms and life processes. Many different cell responses are mediated by cAMP; these include increase in heart rate, cortisol secretion, and breakdown of glycogen and fat. cAMP is essential for the maintenance of memory in the brain, relaxation in the heart, and water absorbed in the kidney. This pathway can activate enzymes and regulate gene expression. The activation of preexisting enzymes is a much faster process, whereas regulation of gene expression is much longer and can take up to hours. The cAMP pathway is studied through loss of function (inhibition) and gain of function (increase) of cAMP.

If cAMP-dependent pathway is not controlled, it can ultimately lead to hyper-proliferation, which may contribute to the development and/or progression of cancer.

== Activation ==
Activated GPCRs cause a conformational change in the attached G protein complex, which results in the G_{s} alpha subunit's exchanging GDP for GTP and separation from the beta and gamma subunits. The G_{s} alpha subunit, in turn, activates adenylyl cyclase, which quickly converts ATP into cAMP. This leads to the activation of the cAMP-dependent pathway. This pathway can also be activated downstream by directly activating adenylyl cyclase or PKA.

Molecules that activate cAMP pathway include:

- cholera toxin - increases cAMP levels
- forskolin - a diterpene natural product that activates adenylyl cyclase
- caffeine and theophylline inhibit cAMP phosphodiesterase, which degrades cAMP - thus enabling higher levels of cAMP than would otherwise be had.
- bucladesine (dibutyryl cAMP, db cAMP) - also a phosphodiesterase inhibitor
- pertussis toxin, which increases cAMP levels by inhibiting Gi to its GDP (inactive) form. This leads to an increase in adenylyl cyclase activity, thereby increasing cAMP levels, which can lead to an increase in insulin and therefore hypoglycemia

== Deactivation ==
The G_{s} alpha subunit slowly catalyzes the hydrolysis of GTP to GDP, which in turn deactivates the G_{s} protein, shutting off the cAMP pathway. The pathway may also be deactivated downstream by directly inhibiting adenylyl cyclase or dephosphorylating the proteins phosphorylated by PKA.

Molecules that inhibit the cAMP pathway include:

- cAMP phosphodiesterase converts cAMP into AMP by breaking the phosphodiester bond, in turn reducing the cAMP levels
- G_{i} protein, which is a G protein that inhibits adenylyl cyclase, reducing cAMP levels.
