= RAPGEF3 =

Protein-coding gene in humans

Identifiers
- Aliases: RAPGEF3, CAMP-GEFI, EPAC, EPAC1, HSU79275, bcm910, Rap guanine nucleotide exchange factor 3
- External IDs: OMIM: 606057; MGI: 2441741; GeneCards: RAPGEF3

Gene location (Human)
Chr.	Chromosome 12 (human)
Band	12q13.11	Start	47,734,363 bp
Band	12q13.11	End	47,771,040 bp

Gene location (Mouse)
Chr.	Chromosome 15 (mouse)
Band	15|15 F1	Start	97,744,770 bp
Band	15|15 F1	End	97,767,972 bp
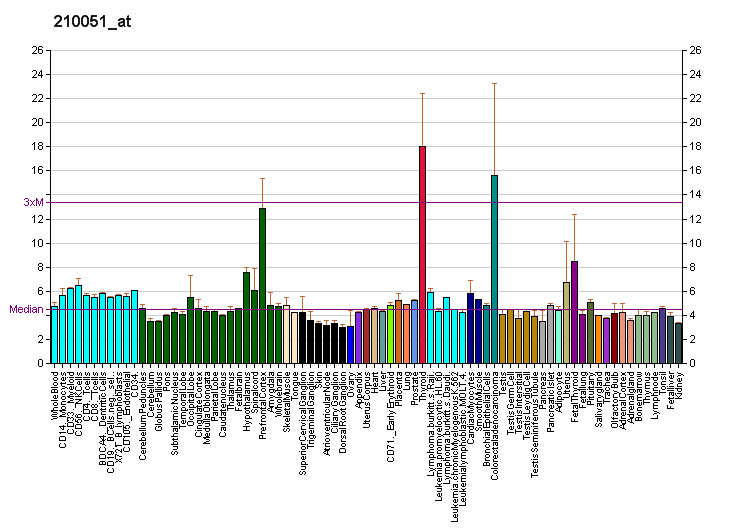
RNA expression pattern
Bgee	Human / Mouse (ortholog); Top expressed in: right lobe of thyroid gland; apex of heart; right ovary; left lobe of thyroid gland; left ovary; tendon of biceps brachii; right uterine tube; sural nerve; canal of the cervix; ectocervix / Top expressed in: aortic valve; motor neuron; ascending aorta; retinal pigment epithelium; ciliary body; right kidney; vestibular membrane of cochlear duct; iris; Rostral migratory stream; renal cortex; More reference expression data
BioGPS	More reference expression data
Gene ontology
Molecular function	nucleotide binding; protein domain specific binding; cAMP binding; protein binding; guanyl-nucleotide exchange factor activity
Cellular component	filopodium; microvillus; cortical actin cytoskeleton; extracellular exosome; endomembrane system; lamellipodium; intracellular anatomical structure; membrane; plasma membrane
Biological process	establishment of endothelial barrier; regulation of actin cytoskeleton reorganization; intracellular signal transduction; regulation of insulin secretion; small GTPase mediated signal transduction; Rap protein signal transduction; positive regulation of syncytium formation by plasma membrane fusion; regulation of histone H3-K9 acetylation; positive regulation of peptidyl-serine phosphorylation; positive regulation of angiogenesis; positive regulation of protein acetylation; positive regulation of protein export from nucleus; positive regulation of GTPase activity; angiogenesis; cell population proliferation; cAMP-mediated signaling; positive regulation of stress fiber assembly; signal transduction; cellular response to cAMP; negative regulation of syncytium formation by plasma membrane fusion
Sources:Amigo / QuickGO
Orthologs
Databases	NCBI: entry; OMA: entry
Species	Human	Mouse
Entrez	10411	223864
Ensembl	ENSG00000079337	ENSMUSG00000022469
UniProt	O95398	Q8VCC8
RefSeq (mRNA)	NM_001098531; NM_001098532; NM_006105	NM_001177810; NM_001177811; NM_144850; NM_001357630
RefSeq (protein)	NP_001092001; NP_001092002; NP_006096	NP_001171281; NP_001171282; NP_659099; NP_001344559
Location (UCSC)	Chr 12: 47.73 – 47.77 Mb	Chr 15: 97.74 – 97.77 Mb
PubMed search
- Wikidata
View/Edit Human	View/Edit Mouse

Rap guanine nucleotide exchange factor 3 also known as exchange factor directly activated by cAMP 1 (EPAC1) or cAMP-regulated guanine nucleotide exchange factor I (cAMP-GEFI) is a protein that in humans is encoded by the RAPGEF3 gene.

As the name suggests, EPAC proteins (EPAC1 and EPAC2) are a family of intracellular sensors for cAMP, and function as nucleotide exchange factors for the Rap subfamily of RAS-like small GTPases.

== History and discovery ==
Since the landmark discovery of the prototypic second messenger cAMP in 1957, three families of eukaryotic cAMP receptors have been identified to mediate the intracellular functions of cAMP. While protein kinase A (PKA) or cAMP-dependent protein kinase and cyclic nucleotide regulated ion channel (CNG and HCN) were initially unveiled in 1968 and 1985 respectively; EPAC genes were discovered in 1998 independently by two research groups. Kawasaki et al. identified cAMP-GEFI and cAMP-GEFII as novel genes enriched in brain using a differential display protocol and by screening clones with cAMP-binding motif. De Rooij and colleagues performed a database search for proteins with sequence homology to both GEFs for Ras and Rap1 and to cAMP-binding sites, which led to the identification and subsequent cloning of RAPGEF3 gene. The discovery of EPAC family cAMP sensors suggests that the complexity and possible readouts of cAMP signaling are much more elaborate than previously envisioned. This is due to the fact that the net physiological effects of cAMP entail the integration of EPAC- and PKA-dependent pathways, which may act independently, converge synergistically, or oppose each other in regulating a specific cellular function.

== Gene ==
Human RAPGEF3 gene is present on chromosome 12 (12q13.11: 47,734,367-47,771,041). Out of the many predicted transcript variants, three that are validated in the NCBI database include transcript variant 1 (6,239 bp), 2 (5,773 bp) and 3 (6,003 bp). While variant 1 encodes for EPAC1a (923 amino acids), both variant 2 and 3 encode EPAC1b (881 amino acids).

== Protein family ==
In mammals, the EPAC protein family contains two members: EPAC1 (this protein) and EPAC2 (RAPGEF4). They further belong to a more extended family of Rap/Ras-specific GEF proteins that also include C3G (RAPGEF1), PDZ-GEF1 (RAPGEF2), PDZ-GEF2 (RAPGEF6), Repac (RAPGEF5), CalDAG-GEF1 (ARHGEF1), CalDAG-GEF3 (ARHGEF3), PLCε1 (PLCE1) and RasGEF1A, B, C.

== Protein structure and mechanism of activation ==
EPAC proteins consist of two structural lobes/halves connected by the so-called central "switchboard" region. The N terminal regulatory lobe is responsible for cAMP binding while the C-terminal lobe contains the nucleotide exchange factor activity. At the basal cAMP-free state, EPAC is kept in an auto-inhibitory conformation, in which the N-terminal lobe folds on top of the C-terminal lobe, blocking the active site. Binding of cAMP to EPAC induces a hinge motion between the regulatory and catalytic halves. As a consequence, the regulatory lobe moves away from catalytic lobe, freeing the active site. In addition, cAMP also prompts conformational changes within the regulatory lobe that lead to the exposure of a lipid binding motif, allowing the proper targeting of EPAC1 to the plasma membrane. Entropically favorable changes in protein dynamics have also been implicated in cAMP mediated EPAC activation.

== Tissue distribution and cellular localization ==
Human and mice EPAC1 mRNA expression is rather ubiquitous. As per Human Protein Atlas documentation, EPAC1 mRNA is detectable in all normal human tissues. Further, medium to high levels of corresponding protein are also measureable in more than 50% of the 80 tissue samples analyzed. In mice, high levels of EPAC1 mRNA are detected in kidney, ovary, skeletal muscle, thyroid and certain areas of the brain.

EPAC1 is a multifunctional protein whose cellular functions are tightly regulated in spatial and temporal manners. EPAC1 is localized to various subcellular locations during different stages of the cell cycle. Through interactions with an array of cellular partners, EPAC1 has been shown to form discrete signalsomes at plasma membrane, nuclear-envelope, and cytoskeleton, where EPAC1 regulates numerous cellular functions.

== Clinical relevance ==
Studies based on genetically engineered mouse models of EPAC1 have provided valuable insights into understanding the in vivo functions of EPAC1 under both physiological and pathophysiological conditions. Overall, mice deficient of EPAC1 or both EPAC1 and EPAC2 appear relatively normal without major phenotypic defects. These observations are consistent with the fact that cAMP is a major stress response signal not essential for survival. This makes EPAC1 an attractive target for therapeutic intervention as the on-target toxicity of EPAC-based therapeutics will likely be low. Up to date, genetic and pharmacological analyses of EPAC1 in mice have revealed that EPAC1 plays important roles in cardiac stresses and heart failure, leptin resistance and energy homeostasis, chronic pain, infection, cancer metastasis, metabolism and secondary hemostasis. Interestingly, EPAC1 deficient mice have prolonged clotting time and fewer, younger, larger and more agonist-responsive blood platelets. EPAC1 is not present in mature platelets, but is required for normal megakaryopoiesis and the subsequent expression of several important proteins involved in key platelets functions.

== Pharmacological agonists and antagonists ==
There have been significant interests in discovering and developing small modulators specific for EPAC proteins for better understanding the functions of EPAC mediated cAMP signaling, as well as for exploring the therapeutic potential of targeting EPAC proteins. Structure-based design targeting the key difference between the cAMP binding sites of EPAC and PKA led to the identification of a cAMP analogue, 8-pCPT-2'-O-Me-cAMP that is capable of selectively activate EPAC1. Further modifications allowed the development of more membrane permeable and metabolically stable EPAC-specific agonists.

A high throughput screening effort resulted in the discovery of several novel EPAC specific inhibitors (ESIs), among which two ESIs act as EPAC2 selective antagonists with negligible activity towards EPAC1. Another ESI, CE3F4, with modest selectivity for EPAC1 over EPAC2, has also been reported. The discovery of EPAC specific antagonists represents a research milestone that allows the pharmacological manipulation of EPAC activity. In particular, one EPAC antagonist, ESI-09, with excellent activity and minimal toxicity in vivo, has been shown to be a useful pharmacological tool for probing physiological functions of EPAC proteins and for testing therapeutic potential of targeting EPAC in animal disease models.
