= Mycelium-based materials =

Materials made out of fungi growth

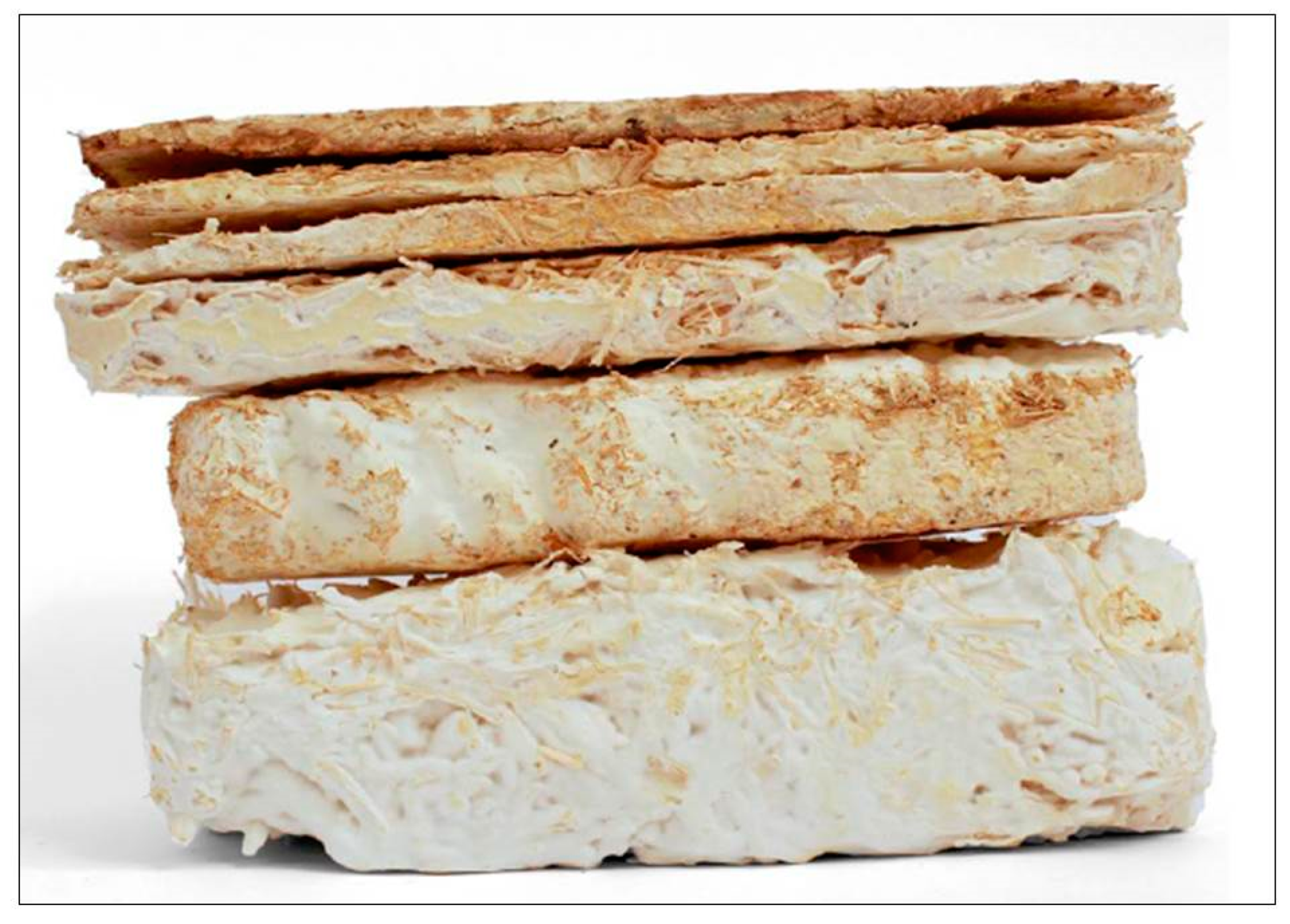
Mycelium based composite

Since they were first developed, mycelium‑based materials, often called mycelium composites, have been used in many different areas, from small experimental projects to large industrial production. Mycelium, the root-like structure that comprises the main vegetative growth of fungi, has been identified as an ecologically friendly stand-alone / composite substitute for many materials throughout different industries, including packaging, design, building, fashion and cosmetics applications. Mycelium composites present a sustainable biodegradable alternative to conventional materials that can convert waste into primary feedstock. Mycelium materials that have been dried or heated so they cannot grow are usually treated as biomaterials. Mycelium that is still alive and able to grow is usually treated as an engineered living material."l

== History ==
=== Early Foundations (1990s–2000s) ===
The first explorations into fungal biomaterials began in the 1990s with Shigeru Yamanaka's research on mycelium for paper and building materials.

By the early 2000s, artists like Phil Ross experimented with cultivating mushrooms for structural blocks ("Mycotecture"), while engineering students Eben Bayer and Gavin McIntyre developed mycelium insulation at Rensselaer Polytechnic Institute.

In 2007, Ecovative filed a key patent for growing mycelium composites as insulation boards ("Greensulate"), marking a turning point toward commercialization.

=== Commercialization & Expansion (2010–2015) ===
MycoWorks (Phil Ross & Sophia Wang) patented methods for fungus structures in construction (2011).

Early European research led by Maurizio Montalti at Utrecht University explored local waste streams for mycelium composites.

Initial applications focused on packaging materials as sustainable alternatives to polystyrene foam; subsequent expansion included furniture panels and art installations.

=== Diversification & Technological Advances (2015–Present) ===
Patent applications for architecture (e.g., HyFi Tower), textiles/leather alternatives ("myco-leather"), biomedical scaffolds, sound/thermal insulation panels, footwear components, and interior design objects.

Advances include robotic fabrication/3D printing, digital design integration, genetic modification for property tuning, use of diverse substrates/fungal species, and improved post-processing techniques.

== Species and biological structures ==
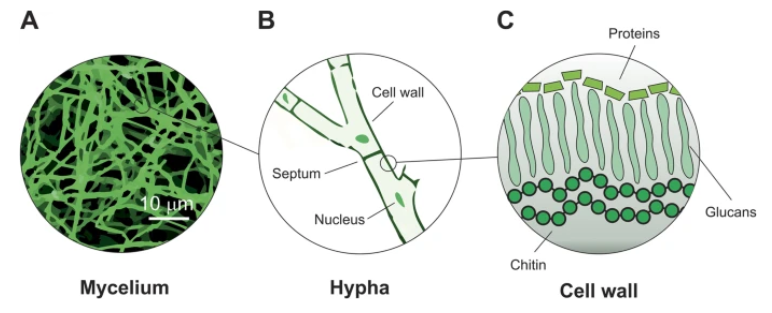
Breakdown of mycelium into its smaller components on three length scales

The hyphal network that provides structural cell walls for the fungal organisms' growth are found within three different types that correspond to its sporocarps; generative, skeletal and ligative. Hyphal systems fall under three categories – monomitic, dimitic, and trimitic. While monomitic hyphae are generative, dimitic systems have a combination of generative and skeletal (most common) or ligative. As for trimitic systems, they are composed of all three hyphal typologies. These traits are valuable as they have an influence on the resulting mechanical properties of the composite matrix, which can inform the selection of species for targeted applications.

Mycelium-based composites are made from a fungal culture and a substrate. When introduced to a fibrous substrate, mainly composed of lignocellulose, the fungi begin to break down the fibers into basic nutrients, which enable the organisms' growth. In the case of composites, the substrate is only partially decomposed during this enzymatic process, creating a hybrid intertwined with the mycelium.

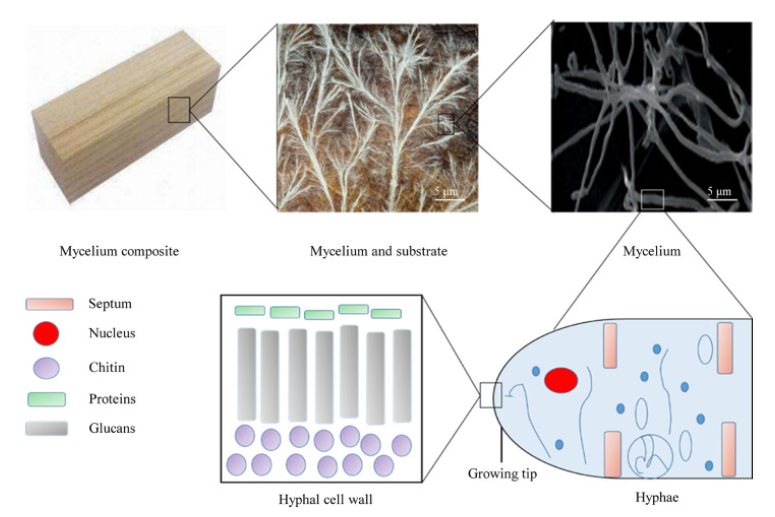
Example of how the mycelium and substrate look in a mycelium composite

The main components of fungi are chitin, polysaccharides, lipids, and proteins. Different compositional amounts of these molecules change the properties of the composites. This is also true for different substrates. Substrates that have higher amounts of chitin and are harder for the mycelium to break down and lead to a stiffer composite formation.

Commonly used species of fungi to grow mycelium are aerobic basidiomycetes, which include Ganoderma sp., Pleurotus sp., and Trametes sp. Basidiomycetes have favorable properties as fungi for creating mycelium based composites because they grow at a relatively steady and quick pace, and can use many different types of organic waste as substrates. Some characteristics that these species differ in are elasticity, water absorption, and strength.

As an example, Trametes hirsuta forms a thicker outer layer of mycelium than Pleurotus ostreatus. This allows the Trametes hirsuta composite to remain flexible and stable in high moisture environments. Additionally, Ganoderma lucidum exhibited higher elasticity, even with different types of substrates. Different combinations of fungi, substrate, and environmental conditions can all affect the properties of the resulting composite; this area of research continues to be explored as the applications for mycelium-based composites expand.

== Growth process and fabrication technqiues ==
The initial step in the production of mycelium-based materials is the growth process. The incubation of fungal mycelium requires a ventilated dark environment operating within a specific range of temperature situating between 25-30 °C and humidity settings around 70-80%. The selective pairing of specie with substrate will affect the overall time of mycelial growth and will lead to different properties that will be further discussed below. The average time, however will also depend on the size of the composite and can vary anywhere from 6–20 days up until several weeks.

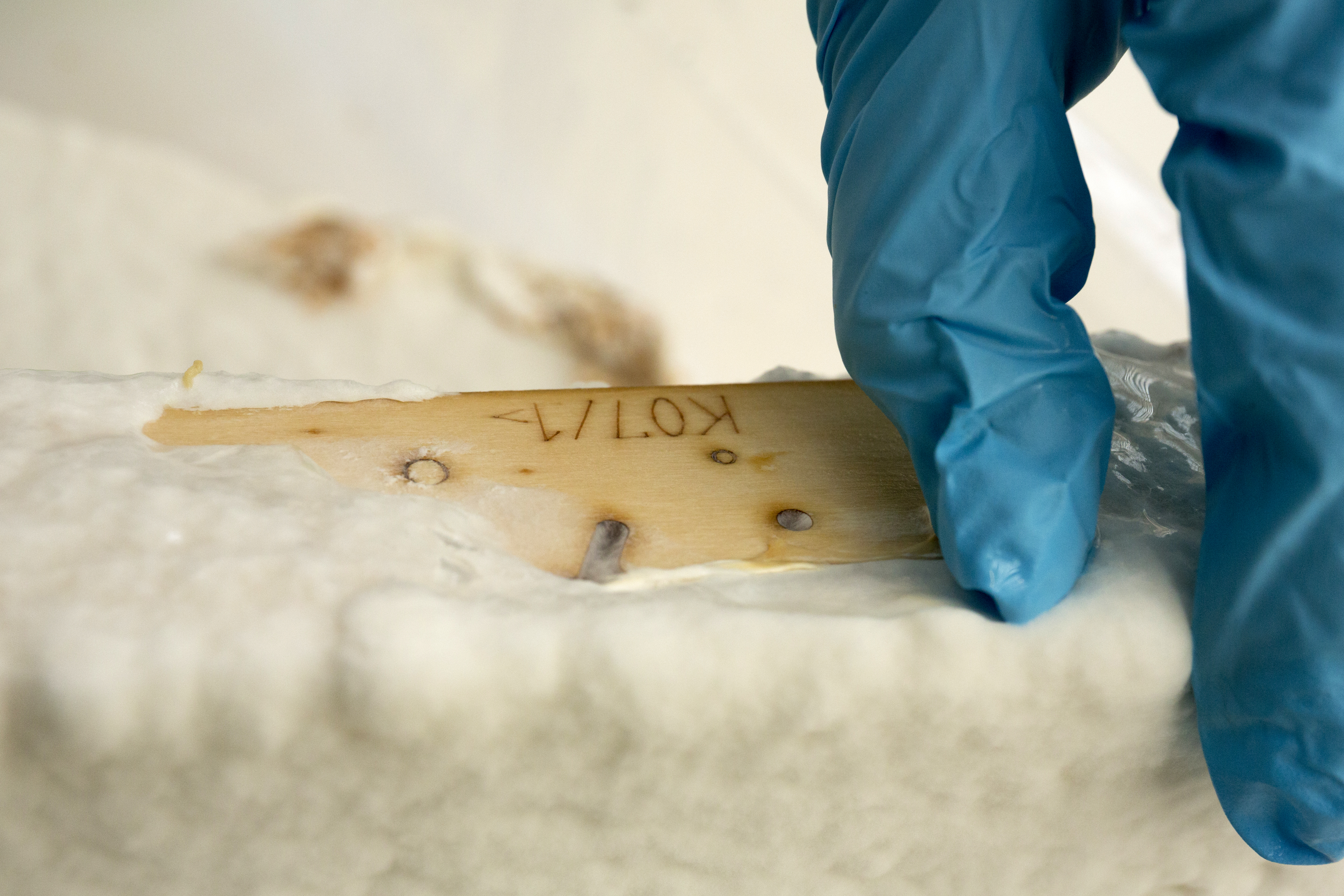
Mycelium degrading hemp shives during 'MY-CO SPACE' project (2021). Wolfgang Günzel

The growth of the organisms happens is three phases; the lag phase, the exponential phase, and the stationary phase. Initially, the lag phase consists of the mycelium cells' introduction to its new environment with little to no population growth. The exponential phase is where the mycelium can develop, increasing in biomass and cell number, if the conditions are appropriate. Lastly, the stationary phase occurs when the fungal biomass stabilizes and the population growth falls back to zero. If left past this stage, the mycelium-based material can start to form fruiting bodies, which is ideally avoided to ensure that the shape and heterogeneity are maintained. The composites must then be dehydrated or baked to become inert and stable. Continued research explores various optimization techniques ensuring foreseeable growth time and material characteristics.

In order to form the structures of the composites, mycelium needs a substrate to grow into. To fabricate these mycelium based composites outside of natural processes, options for substrates include common "left-over" materials such as wood and straw. Recycling waste products contributes to the mycelium based composites' low cost and environmental-friendliness over the current methods and materials.

== Mechanical properties ==
For most industrial materials there is a high degree of control in the processing methods of the final product leading to standardized properties. Mycelium composites still hold many open variables that can significantly affect the material behaviour ranging growth time and conditions, pH and moisture of substrate, and post-treatments. At the cellular level, there is a mixture of elements that will provide material rigidity and strength, such as the content of chitin, chitosan, glucans, manoproteins, and cellulose. Research suggests that the concentration of chitin, for instance, can be measured by the difficulty of the mycelium to break down the sugars in the substrate, leading to a stiffer material as opposed to one that gets digested very easily by the organism. A 2022 study focused on the comparative analysis of substrate granulation to understand the compressive behaviour, where the authors indicate that the orientation of fibres and particle size leading up to ultimate strength. Between a range of three granulations from small (0.5–1.0 mm), medium (0.75–3.0 mm), and large (4.0–12.0 mm), the 34 x 34 x 140 mm samples using particles in the 0.75–3.0 mm range proved to be stronger and stiffer.

The mechanical tests included uniaxial tension and compression, conducted using a specific testing machine and performed in ambient conditions. For the tensile tests, dog bone specimens of dimensions 200 mm × 6 mm × 3.5 mm were used. Cuboid specimens of dimensions 20 mm × 20 mm × 16 mm were tested under compression. The strain rate chosen was 4 × 10−4 per second until failure for tensile tests whereas compressive samples were deformed at a rate of 6.25 × 10−3 per second ranging from 2% to 20%.

== Applications ==
=== Packaging ===
Mycelium‑based composites are an alternative to petroleum‑derived foams and molded fibre products in protective and insulating packaging. These materials can be grown into shapes using agricultural by‑products as substrate, producing lightweight forms with cushioning properties comparable to expanded polystyrene.

Applications include packaging for fragile goods, thermal insulation for perishable items, and single‑use protective inserts. Reported advantages include biodegradability under industrial composting conditions and low energy production. Limitations include slower production times compared to synthetic foams, sensitivity to moisture during use, and variability in mechanical performance depending on substrate and growth conditions.

=== Building materials ===
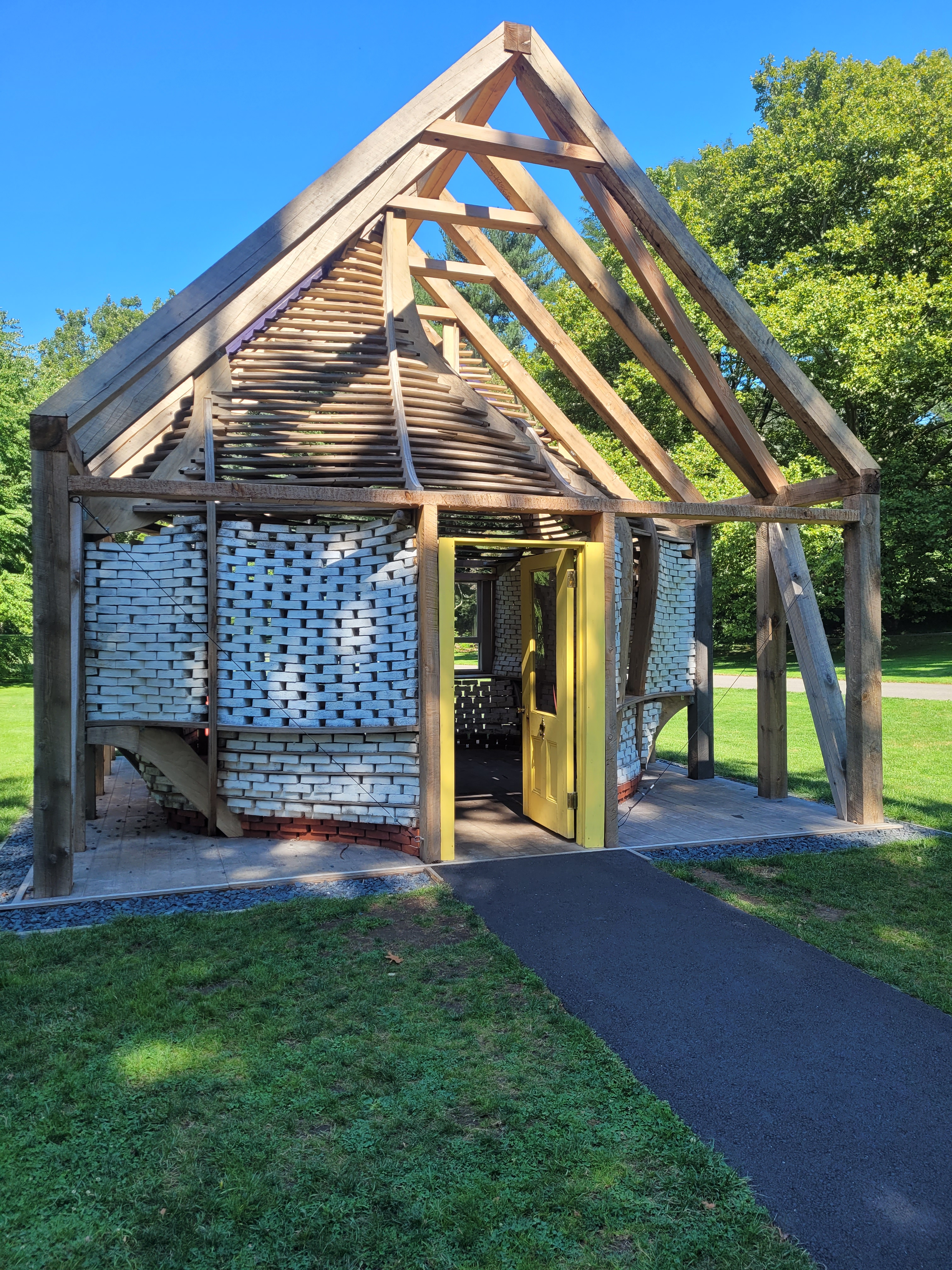
A sample building using mycelium bricks at the New York Botanical Garden, September 2024.

Mycelium based composites have not yet been widely considered as alternatives for wood, or masonry construction. When considering large-scale applications, there are a few avenues for the fabrication of mycelium composites, although the most common consist of external or internal molds for modular units, in-situ monoliths, or myco-welding. The growth guided with external molds is led with a formwork that will eventually be removed to reveal the material in its desired shape, in contrast to an internal mold, also referred to as a soft mold, which acts as a scaffold that remains embedded in the composite. The in-situ monolithic typology references traditional cast-in-place techniques for casting and growing composites at a larger non-modular scale. Lastly, myco-welding bridges these two techniques as it works with living assembly units to render them monolithic, essentially keeping the organism alive in order to create bonding between a block, a layer, or panel with one another. Building examples include the Homegrown Wonderland at the New York Botanical Garden (2024) 4designed by Andre Kong studio; the MycoTemple by Côme Di Meglio (2021); the El-Monolito-Micelio Mycelium Monolith by the research group at UNC Charlotte led by Jonathan Dessi-Olive (2018); or the Hy-Fi pavilion by the Living at MoMA PS1 (2014).

As a load-bearing building application that exceeds the temporary installation timeframe, one of the first precedents has been realized in 2024 by MycoHAB, a pilot project located in Namibia. It came to exist through the BioHAB; a merging of the Johannesburg-headquartered Standard Bank Group, the Massachusetts Institute of Technology Center for Bits and Atoms, the MIT Label Free Research Group, and the architecture firm redhouse, based in Cleveland. They make use of an invasive bush as feedstock to cultivate gourmet oyster mushrooms, which eventually generates a leftover mycelium mass that gets pressed into structural composites blocks. The stand-alone material is then treated with a mud-plaster finishing on the exterior face to protect it from weathering.

However, there are still some challenges linked with mycelium composites as a choice for building materials. The first is the novelty of these materials. They are not yet accepted as replacements for common construction materials because researchers are still working to understand their properties and how these properties are affected by time, environmental conditions, substrate, and fungal species. Mycelium composites also have issues with water absorption. Too much water absorption will lead the composites to fail under their mechanical loads. The relationship between density and water absorption was analyzed to find that composites with a higher density were only slightly affected by the levels of humidity, but remained mechanically sound by the standard necessary for construction materials.

=== Acoustic dampening ===
As with other common building applications, mycelium based materials have also been considered for the application of acoustic dampening. Some species recently under particular consideration include Pleurotus ostreatus (Oyster Mushrooms) and many individual species from the phylum class Basidiomycetes, the latter class being known to have mycelium bodies composed primarily of chitin.

In order to construct said acoustic panels, the filamentous hyphae of the fungal body must be isolated, harvested and processed. This can be done through careful control of humidity, temperature (85-95F), atmospheric CO_{2} concentration (5-7%) and chemical/hormonal additives (forskolin/10-oxo-trans-8-decenoic acid (ODA)), in order to not only increase the volume of growth but also encourage the resultant growth to consist of a higher percentage of useful biopolymer material. Fine control over the proportion of cross linkages within the resulting chitin biopolymer is also possible.

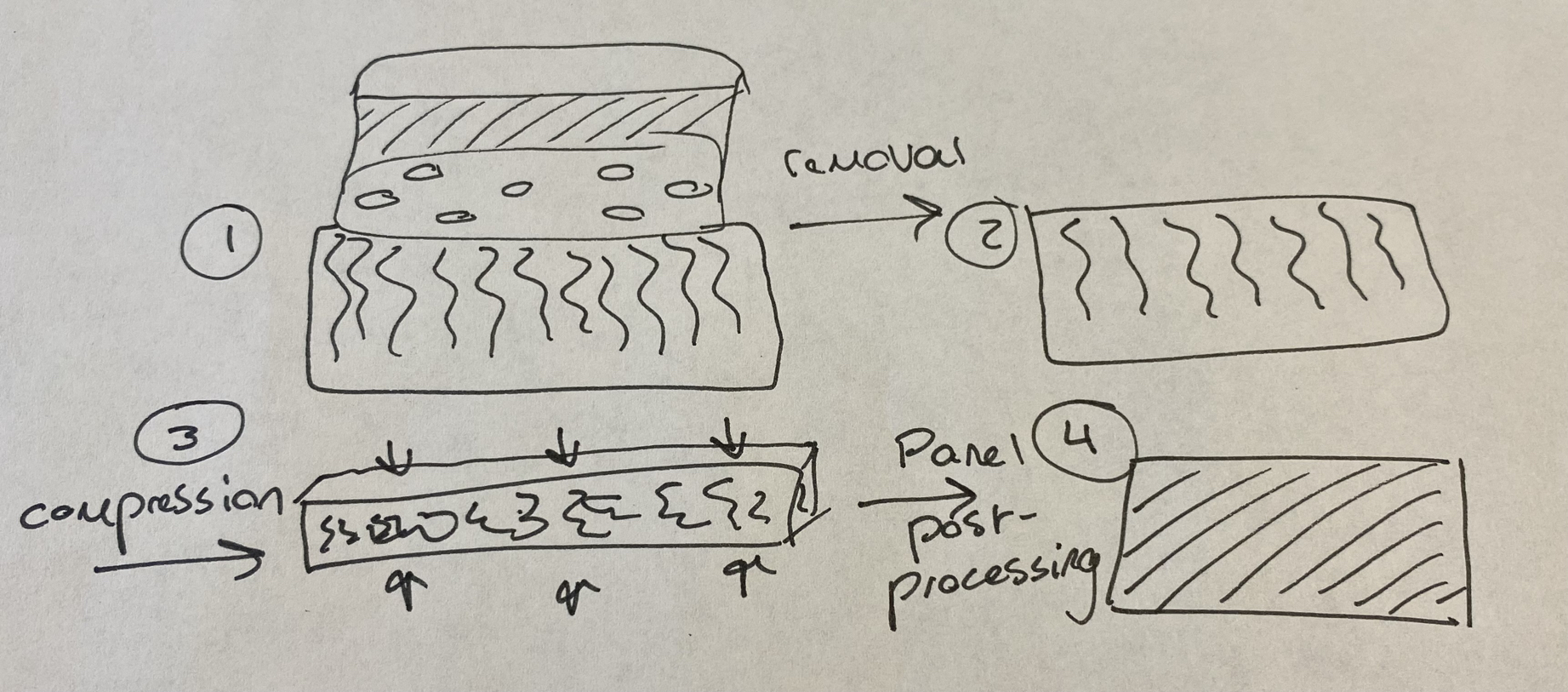
Basic diagram of mycelium paneling manufacture

To construct a panel of acoustic dampening material, the fungus can be mechanically suspended within a rigid chamber, and allowed to grow to fill the space. After the space has been filled, the mycelium is compressed and allowed to grow again into the resultant space, after which the product is dried and post processed for specific applications (embossing or decorative purposes).

Compared to conventional acoustic dampening materials like foam, cork, felt, cotton and ceiling tiles, mycelium based panels display comparable acoustic absorption in frequencies around 3000 Hz and above, while falling short in performance at frequencies below 3000 Hz. Performance is dependent on the mix of substrate, species, and yield varying absorbance profiles.

=== Fashion and cosmetics ===
Within the contemporary fashion industry there has been a push for more ethically sourced materials in order to alleviate environmental concerns. To fulfil these needs, companies like Mycoworks, Ecovative, and Sqim (Ephea/Mogu), have developed sustainable materials to substitute for leather of varying thicknesses and applications. The first mycelium leather wearable garment was produced by Sqim through Ephea in collaboration with the fashion house of Givenchy (2022). Shortly after, Mycoworks followed with their first fashion runway debut in collaboration with Swedish brand Deadwood Studios (2023).

Beyond textiles, mycelium based materials have also found use for substitution in makeup wedges, eye masks and sheet masks. Fungi contain a multitude of bioactive compounds, such as terpenoids, selenium, phenolics, polyphenolics, vitamins, polysaccharides, and volatile organic compounds. The extracts provide skin care benefits as moisturizing, anti-aging, anti-oxidant, anti-wrinkle, anti-acne and anti-dandruff agent. In particular, the specie Ceriporia lacerata was studied for skin aging, effectively increasing collagen while preventing skin barrier damage and wrinkles. In addition, it demonstrated anti-inflammatory and wound-healing effects presenting itself as a great potential ingredient in cosmeceutical skin care.

== See also ==
- Entangled Life – 2020 non-fiction book by Merlin Sheldrake
