= Colforsin daropate =

Chemical compound

Clinical data
- AHFS/Drugs.com: International Drug Names
- ATC code: none

Legal status
- Legal status: In general: ℞ (Prescription only)

Identifiers
- IUPAC name: [(3R,4aR,5S,6S,6aS,10S,10aR,10bS)-5-acetyloxy-3-ethenyl-10,10b-dihydroxy-3,4a,7,7,10a-pentamethyl-1-oxo-5,6,6a,8,9,10-hexahydro-2H-benzo[f]chromen-6-yl] 3-dimethylaminopropanoate
- CAS Number: 113462-26-3; HCl: 138605-00-2
- PubChem CID: 444029; HCl: 444028
- ChemSpider: 392052; HCl: 392051
- UNII: 1196KQZ976; HCl: C6P4R272GT
- KEGG: HCl: D01697
- CompTox Dashboard (EPA): DTXSID20150415; HCl: DTXSID90930165

Chemical and physical data
- Formula: C_{27}H_{43}NO_{8}
- Molar mass: 509.640 g·mol^{−1}
- 3D model (JSmol): Interactive image
- SMILES: CC(=O)O[C@H]1[C@H]([C@H]2C(CC[C@@H]([C@@]2([C@@]3([C@@]1(O[C@@](CC3=O)(C)C=C)C)O)C)O)(C)C)OC(=O)CCN(C)C
- InChI: InChI=1S/C27H43NO8/c1-10-24(5)15-18(31)27(33)25(6)17(30)11-13-23(3,4)21(25)20(35-19(32)12-14-28(8)9)22(34-16(2)29)26(27,7)36-24/h10,17,20-22,30,33H,1,11-15H2,2-9H3/t17-,20-,21-,22-,24-,25-,26+,27-/m0/s1; Key:RSOZZQTUMVBTMR-XGUNBQNXSA-N

Colforsin daropate is a cardiovascular drug used to treat acute heart failure. Chemically, it is a carboxylic ester derived from the condensation of forskolin (colforsin) with N,N-dimethyl-β-alanine.

Its water-soluble hydrochloride salt (NKH 477) is an adenylyl cyclase activator which has been studied for its cardiac selectivity.

Colforsin daropate has been studied for its potential to be repurposed for the treatment of some types of cancer.
