= Mycelium =

Root-like structure of a fungus

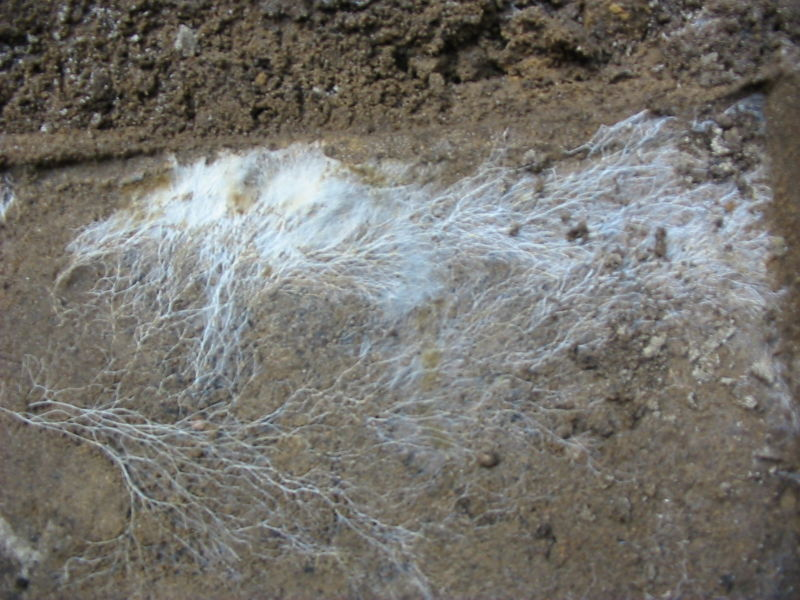
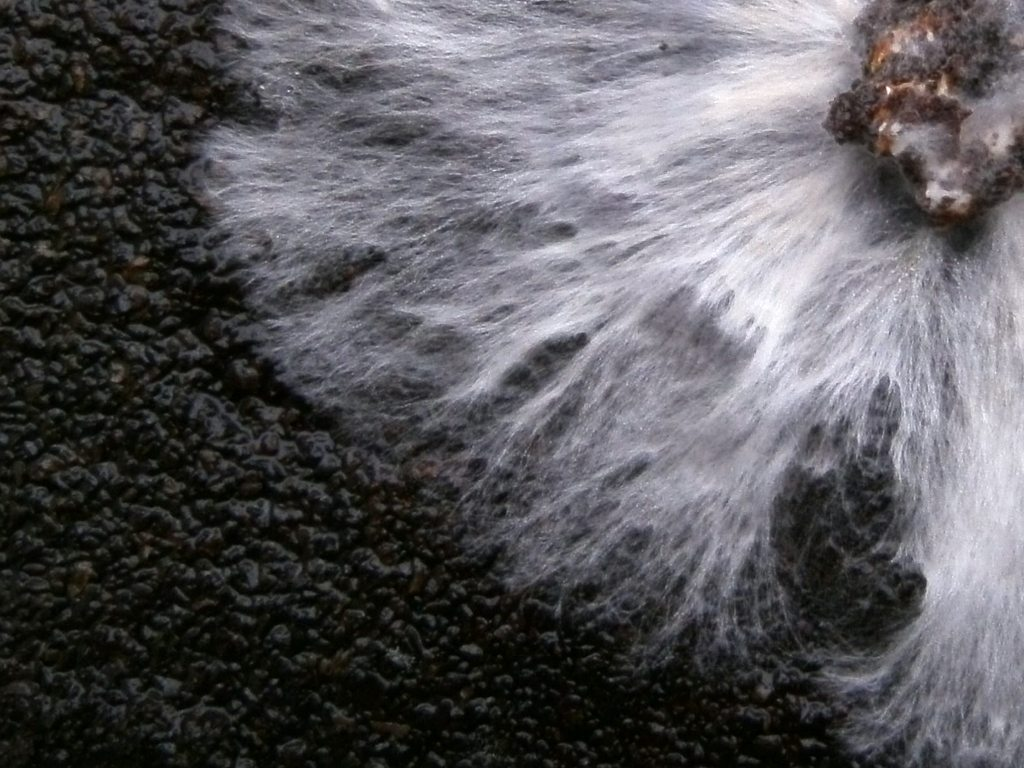
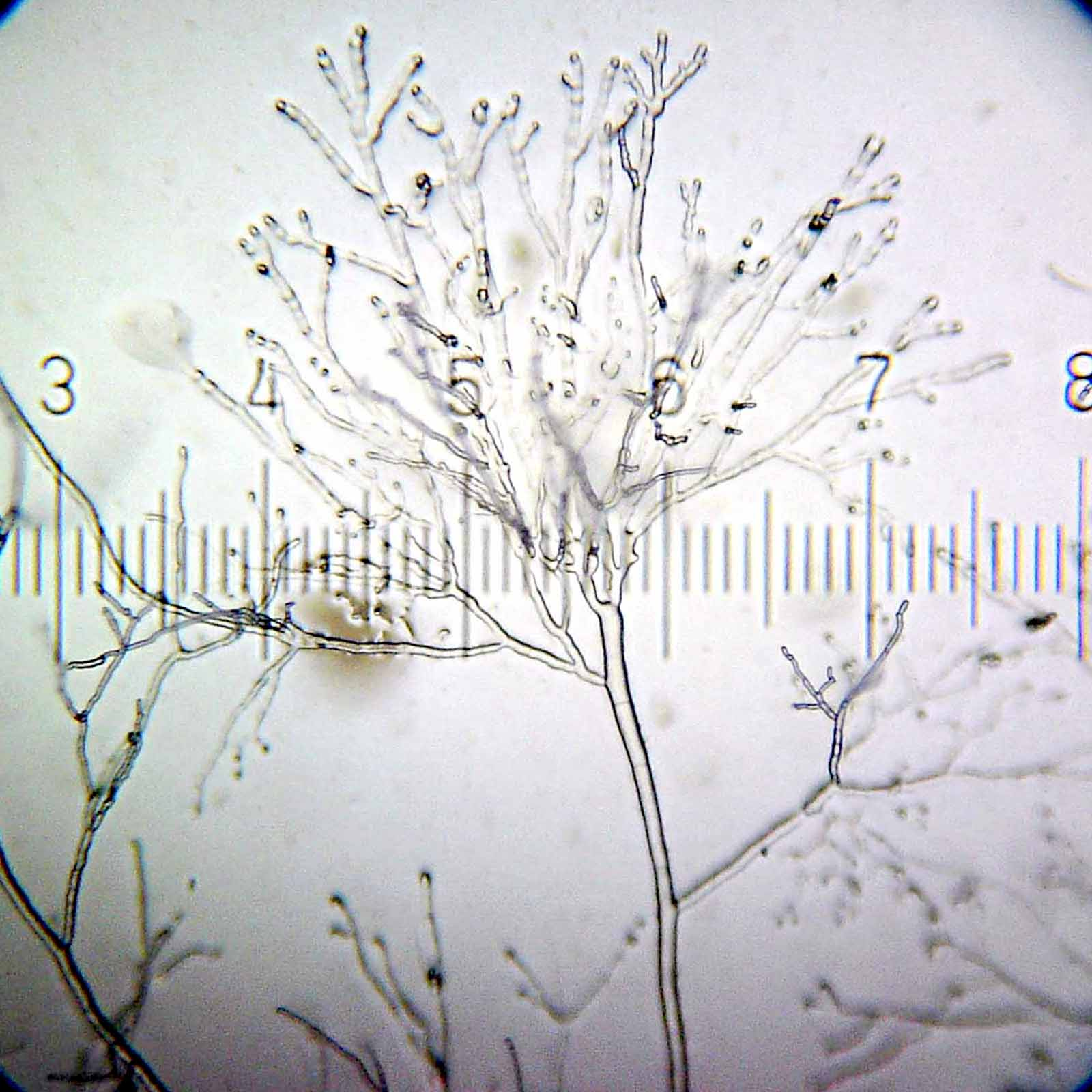
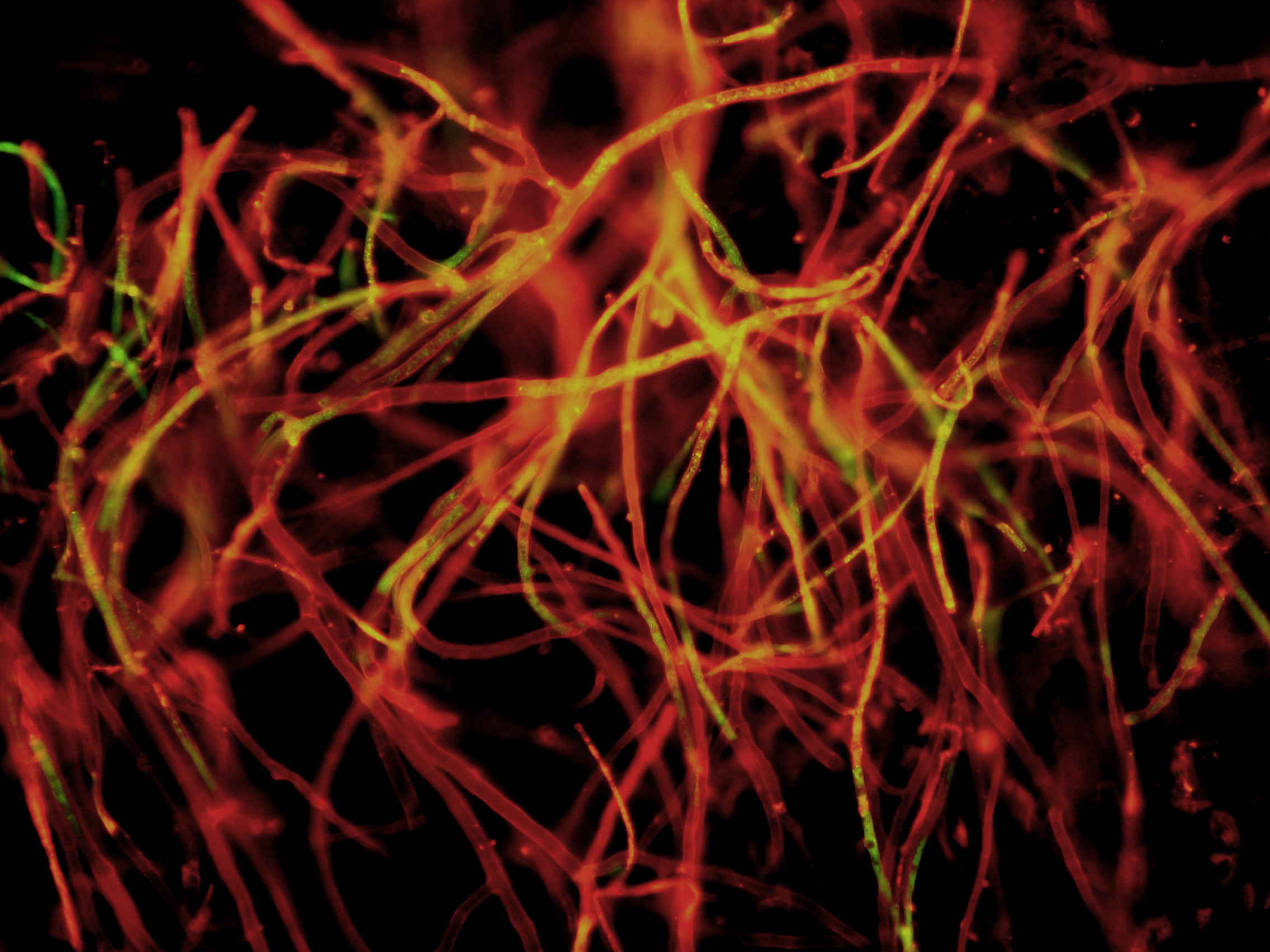
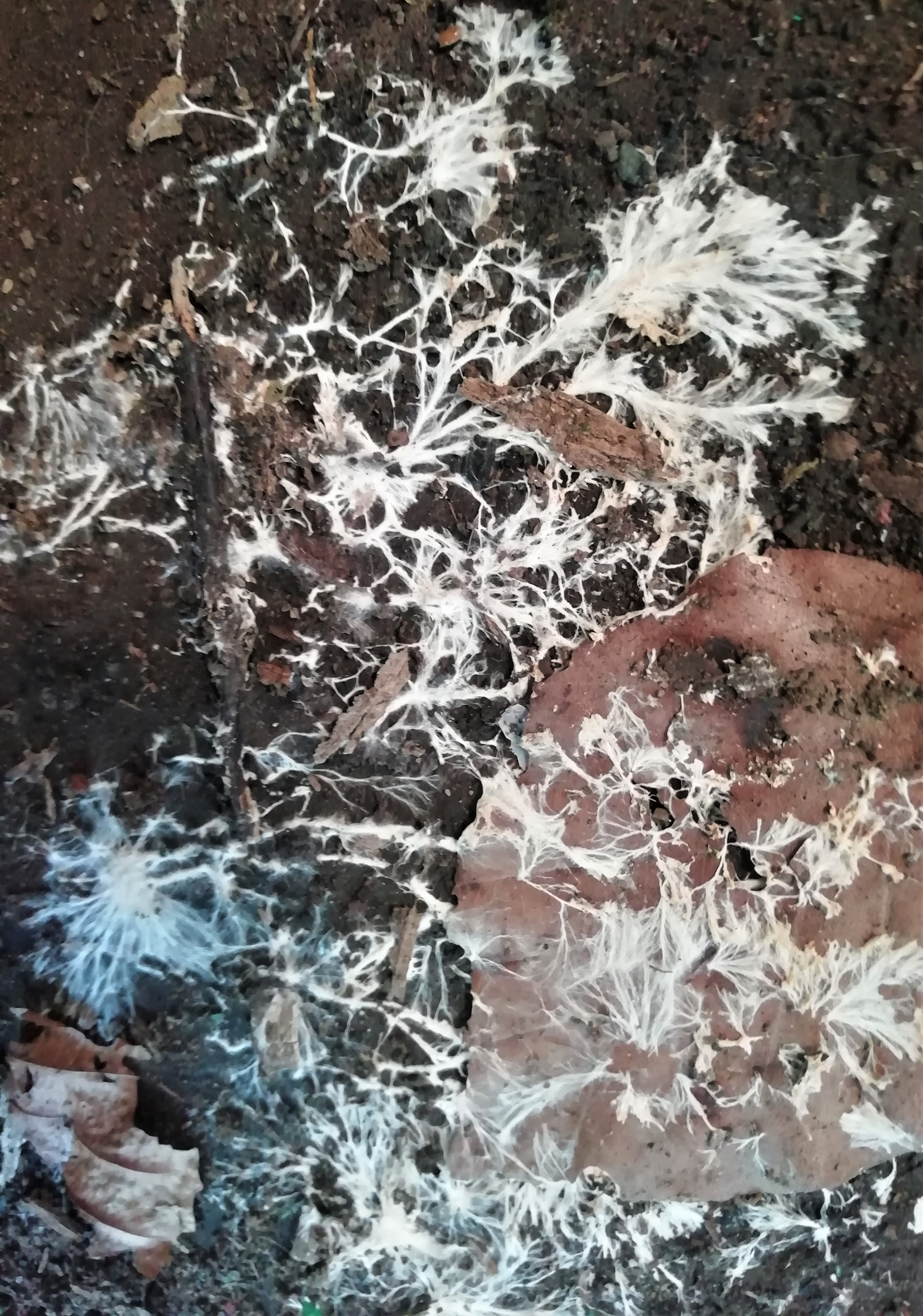
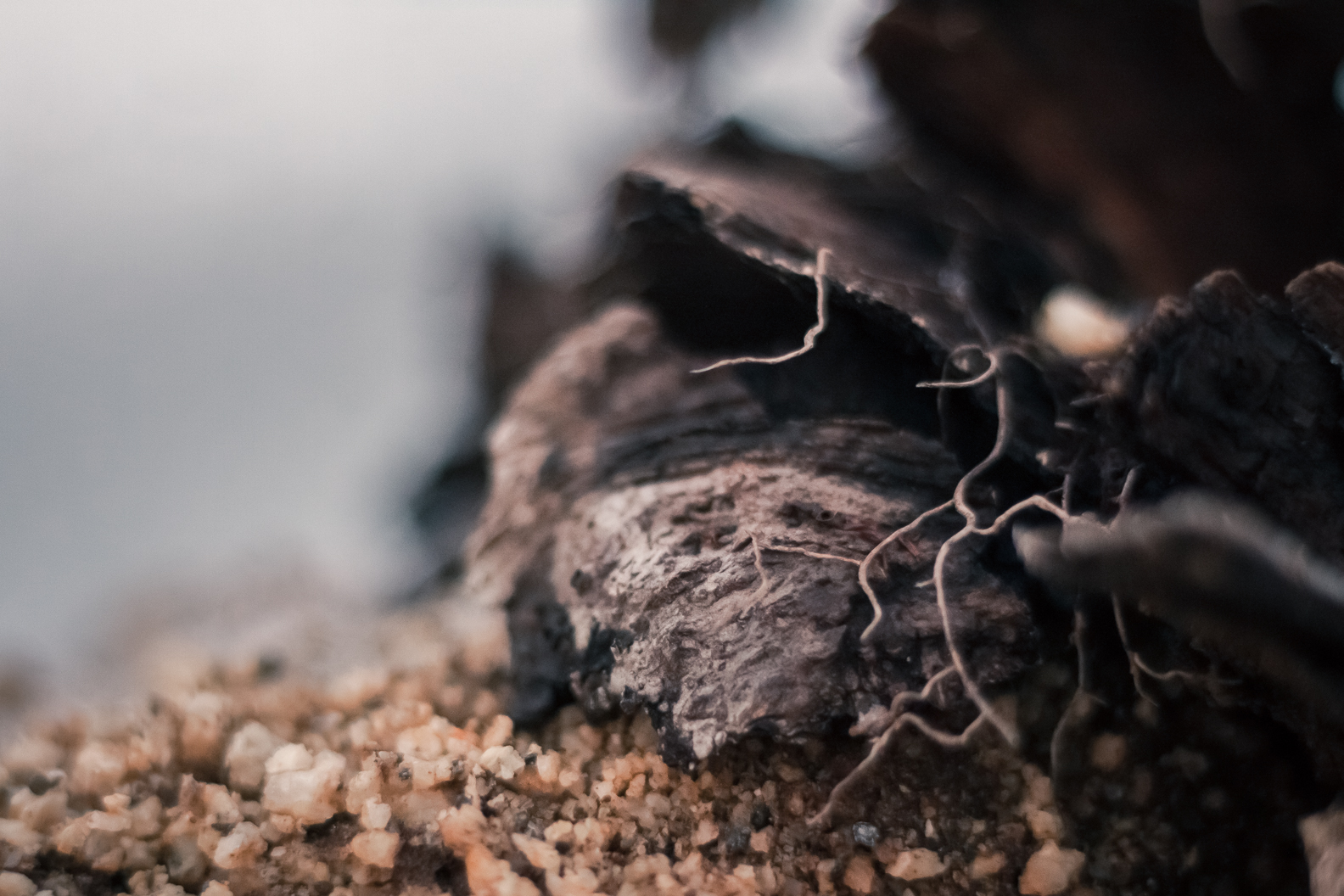
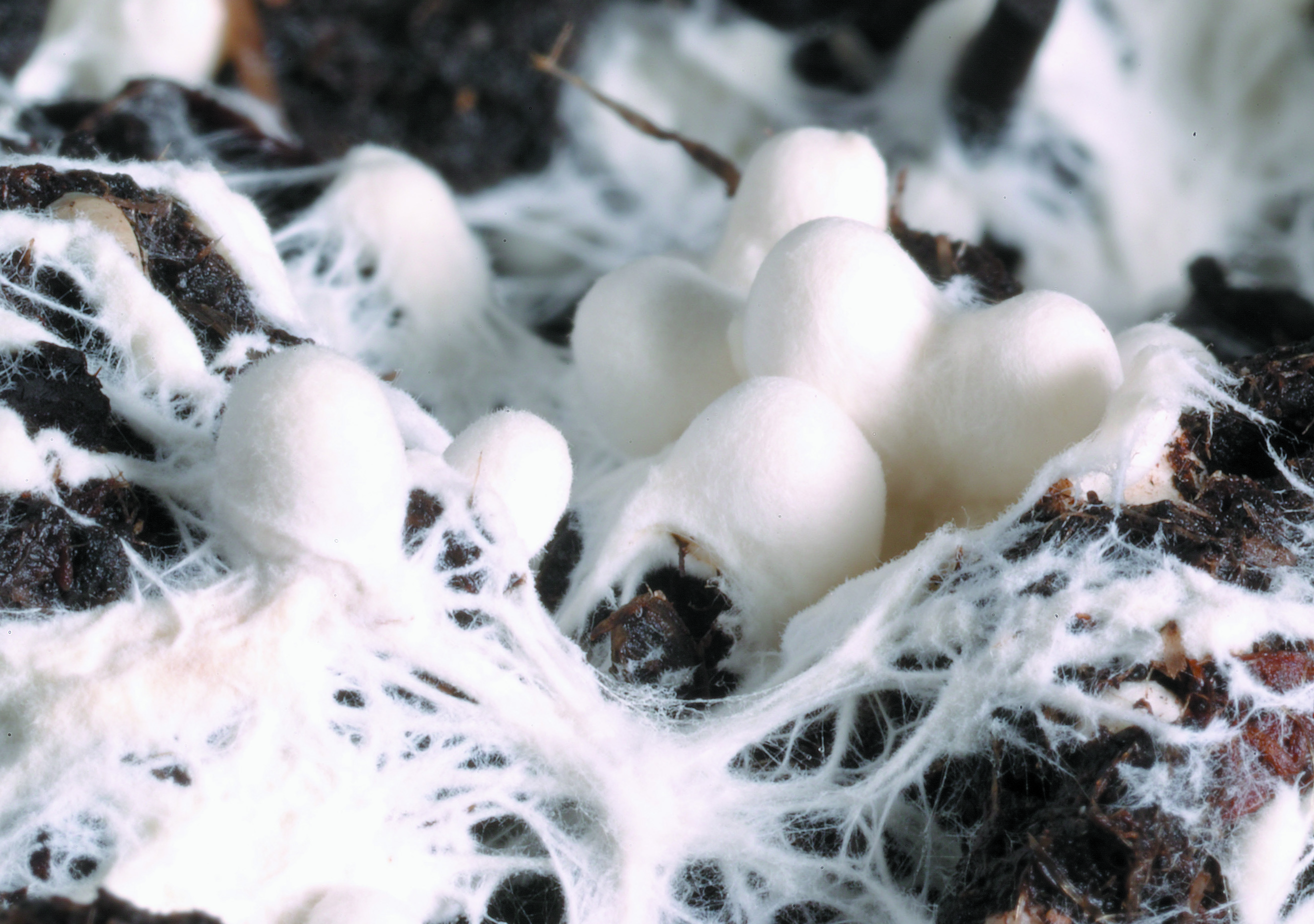
Mycelium
Various examples of mycelium in different sizes, environments and species.

Mycelium (pl.: mycelia) (Note: This is the preferred plural form, though mycelium, like fungus, can be considered either singular or plural.) is a root-like structure of a fungus consisting of a mass of branching, thread-like hyphae. Its normal form is that of branched, slender, entangled, anastomosing, hyaline threads. Fungal colonies composed of mycelium are found in and on soil and many other substrates. A typical single spore germinates into monokaryotic mycelium, which cannot reproduce sexually; when two compatible monokaryotic mycelia join and form dikaryotic mycelium, that mycelium may form fruiting bodies such as mushrooms. Mycelium may be minute, forming a colony that is too small to see, or may grow to span thousands of acres as in Armillaria.

Through the mycelium, a fungus absorbs nutrients from its environment. It does this in a two-stage process. First, the hyphae secrete enzymes onto or into the food source, which break down biological polymers into smaller units such as monomers. These monomers are then absorbed into the mycelium by facilitated diffusion and active transport.

Mycelia are vital in terrestrial and aquatic ecosystems for their role in the decomposition of plant material. They contribute to the organic fraction of soil, and their growth releases carbon dioxide back into the atmosphere (see carbon cycle). Ectomycorrhizal extramatrical mycelium, as well as the mycelium of arbuscular mycorrhizal fungi, increase the efficiency of water and nutrient absorption of most plants and confers resistance to some plant pathogens. Mycelium is an important food source for many soil invertebrates. They are vital to agriculture and are important to almost all species of plants, many species co-evolving with the fungi. Mycelium is a primary factor in some plants' health, nutrient intake and growth, with mycelium being a major factor to plant fitness.

Networks of mycelia can transport water and spikes of electrical potential.

Sclerotia are compact or hard masses of mycelium.

== Uses ==
=== Agriculture ===
One of the primary roles of fungi in an ecosystem is to decompose organic compounds. Petroleum products and some pesticides (typical soil contaminants) are organic molecules (i.e., they are built on a carbon structure), and thereby show a potential carbon source for fungi. Hence, fungi have the potential to eradicate such pollutants from their environment unless the chemicals prove toxic to the fungus. This biological degradation is a process known as mycoremediation.

Mycelial mats have been suggested as having potential as biological filters, removing chemicals and microorganisms from soil and water. The use of fungal mycelium to accomplish this has been termed mycofiltration.

Knowledge of the relationship between mycorrhizal fungi and plants suggests new ways to improve crop yields.

When spread on logging roads, mycelium can act as a binder, holding disturbed new soil in place, thus preventing washouts until woody plants can establish roots.

Fungi are essential for converting biomass into compost, as they decompose feedstock components such as lignin, which many other composting microorganisms cannot. Turning a backyard compost pile will commonly expose visible networks of mycelia that have formed on the decaying organic material within. Compost is an essential soil amendment and fertilizer for organic farming and gardening. Composting can divert a substantial fraction of municipal solid waste from landfills.

=== Commercial ===
Alternatives to polystyrene and plastic packaging can be produced by growing mycelium in agricultural waste. Mycelium has also been used as a material in furniture, and artificial leather.

One of the main commercial uses of mycelium is its use to create artificial leather. The use of polymeric materials such as polyester or polylactic acid to improve artificial leather properties can negatively affect the biodegradability of the material.

In solid-state fermentation, mycelium is grown on forestry bioproducts, like sawdust, in an environment with high carbon dioxide concentrations and controlled humidity and temperature. The mycelium mat formed on top of the particle bed is dehydrated, chemically treated, and then compressed to a desired thickness and engraved with a pattern.

=== Construction material ===
Mycelium is a strong candidate for sustainable construction primarily due to its lightweight biodegradable structure and its capacity to be grown from waste sources. In addition to this, mycelium has a relatively high strength-to-weight ratio and a much lower embodied energy compared to traditional building materials. Because mycelium takes the form of any mold it is grown in, it can also be advantageous for customization purposes, especially if it is employed as an architectural or aesthetic feature. Current research has also indicated that mycelium does not release toxic resins in the event of a fire because it has a charring effect similar to mass timber. Mycelium plays a role in acoustic insulation, boasting of an absorbance of 70–75% for frequencies of 1500 Hz or less.

==== Strengths and weaknesses ====
Mycelium bio-composites have shown strong potential for structural applications, with much higher strength-to-weight ratios than that of conventional materials due primarily to its low density. Compared to conventional building materials, mycelium also has a number of desirable properties that make it an attractive alternative. For example, it has low thermal conductivity and can provide high acoustic insulation. It is biodegradable, has much lower embodied energy, and can serve as a carbon sink, which makes mycelium bio-composites a possible solution to the emissions, energy, and waste associated with building construction.

While mycelium has possibilities as a structural material, there are several significant disadvantages that make it difficult to be practically implemented in large-scale projects. For one, mycelium does not have particularly high compressive strength on its own, ranging from 0.1–0.2 MPa. This is in stark comparison to traditional concrete, which typically has a compressive strength of 17–28 MPa. Even more, because mycelium is considered a living material, it holds specific requirements that make it susceptible to environmental conditions. For instance, it requires a constant source of air in order to stay alive, needs a relatively humid habitat to grow, and cannot be exposed to large amounts of water for fear of contamination and decay.

==== Mechanical properties ====
Three separate fungi species (Colorius versicolor, Trametes ochracea, and Ganoderma sessile) were mixed independently with 2 substrates (apple and vine) and tested under separate incubation conditions in order to quantify certain mechanical properties of mycelium. In order to do this, samples were grown in molds, incubated, and dried over the course of 12 days. Samples were tested for water absorption using ASTM C272 guidelines and compared against an EPS material. Tiles of uniform size were cut from the fabricated mold and put under an Instron 3345 machine going at 1 mm/min, up until 20% deformation.

Throughout a 4 stage process, the impact of various substrate and fungal mixes was investigated along with properties of mycelium such as density, water absorption, and compressive strength. Samples were separated into two separate incubation methods and inspected for differences in color, texture, and growth. For the same fungi within each incubation method, minimal differences were recorded. However, across disparate substrate mixtures within the same fungi, colorization and external growth varied between the test samples. While loss of organic matter was calculated, no uniform correlation was found between substrate used and chemical properties of the material. For each of the substrate-fungi mixtures, average densities ranged from 174.1 kg/m^{3} to 244.9 kg/m^{3}, with the Ganoderma sessile fungi and apple substrate combination being the most dense. Compression tests revealed the Ganoderma sessile fungi and vine substrate to have the highest strength of the samples tested, but no numerical value was provided. For reference, surrounding literature has provided a ballpark estimate of 1-72 kPa. Beyond this, mycelium has a thermal conductivity of 0.05–0.07W/m·K which is less than that of typical concrete.

==== Construction ====
The construction of mycelium structures is primarily categorized into three approaches. These include growing blocks in molds, growing in place monolithic structures, and bio-welded units. The first approach cultivates mycelium and its substrate in forms, after which it is dried in ovens and then transported and assembled on site. The second approach uses existing formwork and adapts cast-in-place concrete techniques to grow monolithic mycelium structures in place. The third approach is a hybrid of the previous two referred to as myco-welding, where individual pre-grown units are grown together into a larger monolithic structure.

Studies using grow-in-place methods and myco-welding have explored how to cultivate mycelium and re-use formwork in construction and investigated post-tensioning and friction connections. Research in fabrication has revealed some common challenges faced in construction of mycelium structures, mostly related to the growth of the fungi. It can be difficult to cultivate living material into formwork and it is susceptible to contamination if not properly sterilized. The fungi needs to be kept refrigerated to prevent hardening and properly manage growth and substrate consumption. Additionally, the thickness of fungal growth is limited by the presence of oxygen; if there is no oxygen, the center of the growth can die or be contaminated.

==== Environmental impact ====
Researchers have performed life-cycle assessments to evaluate the environmental impact of mycelium bio-composites. Life cycle analysis showed the viability of mycelium as a carbon sink material and as a sustainable alternative to conventional building materials. Use of mycelium as a natural adhesive material may provide environmental benefits, as the fungal-based composites that mycelium is used to create are low cost, low emission, and sustainable. These composites also have a wide range of applications and uses, many of which are in industries responsible for significant environmental pollution, like construction and packaging.

Modern construction and packaging materials are industrially fabricated, non-recyclable, and pollutive: wood products lead to severe deforestation and weather fluctuation; cement is nonbiodegradable and causes high emissions both in production and demolition. Mycelium appears to be cheaper and more sustainable than its counterparts.

Mycelium’s adhesive properties are largely responsible for its diverse array of applications, as it allows them to bind certain substances together. These properties are products of their biological processes, as they secrete corrosive enzymes that allow them to degrade and colonize organic substrates. During degradation, mycelium develops a dense network of thin strands that fuse together within the organic substrate, creating solid material that can hold multiple substrates together. This self-assembly property of mycelium is quite unique, and allows mycelium to grow on a wide range of organic material, including organic waste.

=== Potential ecological role ===
Plants appear to communicate within an ecosystem using mycelium, the fungal network produced by mycorrhiza fungi. Mycelial networks constitute 20-30% of soil biomass, though traditional biomass measures fail to detect them. Some 83% of plants appear to exhibit mutualistic association with mycelium as an extension of their root systems, with varying levels of reliance. By some estimates, mycelial networks receive well over 10% of the photosynthesis output of their host plants.

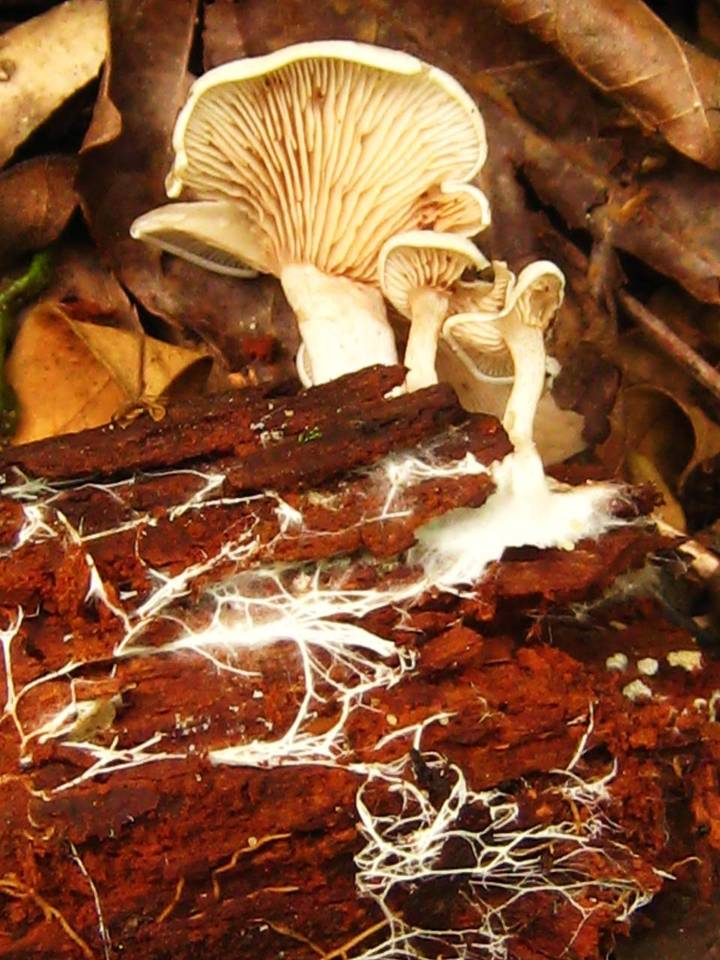
Clitocybe mycelium

This mutualism is initiated by hyphal connections in which mycelial strands infect and attach themselves to plant hyphae, penetrating the cell wall but not entering through the membrane into the plant cytoplasm. Mycelium interacts with the cell at the periarbuscular membrane, which behaves as a sort of exchange medium for nutrients and can produce electrical gradients allowing for electrophysiological signals to be sent and received. In modeling studies, different fungi supply different levels of nutrients and growth-promoting materials, with plants tending to root towards (and thus being infected by) fungi supplying most mineral phosphorus and nitrogen (both essential for plant growth).

Mycorrhizal mycelial associations may intensify competition between individuals of the same species, while alleviating competition between species, via the promotion of inferior competitors, thus promoting plant diversity within its network. In doing so, mycorrhizal fungi promote community ecology, with an added complexity of niche differentiation of different networks and types of mycorrhizal fungi that root at different depths, disperse different organic compounds and nutrients, and have unique interactions with specific species of plants.

=== Mycelial biology and memory ===
Several studies have documented the memory capacity of mycelial networks and their adaptability to specific environmental conditions. Mycelia have been specialized for different functions in various climates and develop symbiotic or pathogenic relationships with other organisms, such as the human pathogen Candida auris, which has developed a unique approach of evading detection by human neutrophils through adaptive selection–a process of fungal learning and memory. Additionally, these functions can change based on the scale of the mycelia and nature of the symbiotic relationship; commensal and mutual relationships between fungi and plants form through a separate process known as mycorrhizal association, which are called mycorrhiza. Additionally, hyphal organization into mycelial networks can be deterministic for a variety of functions including biomass retention, water recycling, expansion of future hyphae on a resource efficient approach towards desired nutrient gradients, and the subsequent distribution of these resources across the hyphal network. On a macroscopic scale, many mycelia operate with a sort of hierarchy having a “trunk” or main mycelium, with smaller “branches” branching off. Some saprotrophic basidiomycetes are able to remember past decisions about directional nutrition gradients and will build future mycelium in that direction.

Current research on collective mycelial intelligence is limited, and while many studies have observed memory and the exchange of electric charge across mycelial networks, this is insufficient evidence to make conclusions about how sensory data is processed in these networks. However, some examples of increased thermal resistance in filamentous fungi suggest a power-law relationship for memory and exposure to a stimulus. Mycelia have also demonstrated the ability to edit their genetic structures within a lifetime due to antibiotic or other extracellular stressors, which can cause rapid acquisition of resistance genes, like those in C. auris. Additionally, plasmodial slime molds demonstrate a similar method of information sharing, as both mycelia and slime molds make use of cAMP molecules for aggregation and signaling.

=== Sclerotium ===
Sclerotium is a compact mass of hardened mycelium. For many years, sclerotia were mistaken for individual organisms and described as separate species. However, in the mid 19th century, it was proven that sclerotia was simply a stage in the life cycle of many fungi. Sclerotia are composed of thick, dense shells with dark cells. They are rich in hyphae emergency supplies, such as oil, and they contain small amounts of water. They can survive in dry environments for many years without losing the ability to grow. The size of sclerotia can range from less than a millimeter to tens of centimeters in diameter.

== See also ==
- Mycelium-based materials – Composite mycelium applications
- Carbon sequestration – Storing carbon in a carbon pool
- Thallus – Undifferentiated vegetative tissue of certain organisms
