= RASGEF1C =

Human Gene

Identifiers
- Aliases: RASGEF1C, RasGEF domain family member 1C
- External IDs: MGI: 1921813; GeneCards: RASGEF1C

Gene location (Human)
Chr.	Chromosome 5 (human)
Band	5q35.3	Start	180,100,795 bp
Band	5q35.3	End	180,209,211 bp

Gene location (Mouse)
Chr.	Chromosome 11 (mouse)
Band	11|11 B1.2- B1.3	Start	49,792,662 bp
Band	11|11 B1.2- B1.3	End	49,871,821 bp
RNA expression pattern
Bgee	Human / Mouse (ortholog); Top expressed in: right hemisphere of cerebellum; gonad; sural nerve; C1 segment; prefrontal cortex; cingulate gyrus; anterior cingulate cortex; right frontal lobe; testicle; Brodmann area 9 / Top expressed in: superior frontal gyrus; sciatic nerve; primary visual cortex; embryo; prefrontal cortex; olfactory bulb; neural tube; stria vascularis; embryo; piriform cortex; More reference expression data
BioGPS	n/a
Gene ontology
Molecular function	guanyl-nucleotide exchange factor activity
Cellular component	intracellular anatomical structure
Biological process	small GTPase mediated signal transduction
Sources:Amigo / QuickGO
Orthologs
Databases	NCBI: entry; OMA: entry
Species	Human	Mouse
Entrez	255426	74563
Ensembl	ENSG00000146090	ENSMUSG00000020374
UniProt	Q8N431	Q9D300
RefSeq (mRNA)	NM_001031799; NM_175062	NM_029004; NM_001347462
RefSeq (protein)	NP_778232	NP_001334391; NP_083280
Location (UCSC)	Chr 5: 180.1 – 180.21 Mb	Chr 11: 49.79 – 49.87 Mb
PubMed search
- Wikidata
View/Edit Human	View/Edit Mouse

RASGEF1C (Ras-Guanine Nucleotide Exchange Factor 1C) is a human protein coding gene that encodes the ras-GEF domain containing family member 1C protein. Human RASGEF1C functions in activating GTPase via Guanine Nucleotide Exchange and it has been found to be associated with neurodegenerative disorders.

The human RASGEF1C gene is a 108,417-base-pair long protein-coding gene located on the minus strand at 5q35.3.

The human RASGEF1C gene has 14 exons and transcribes a 2297-nucleotide mRNA transcript.

== Protein ==
The human RASGEF1C gene encodes only one protein isoform: ras-GEF domain-containing family member 1C protein. This protein is 466 amino acids in length, and it has been predicted to function as a guanine nucleotide exchange factor.

Without undergoing post-translation modifications, the human RASGEF1C protein is 52.9 kdal.

=== Secondary structure ===
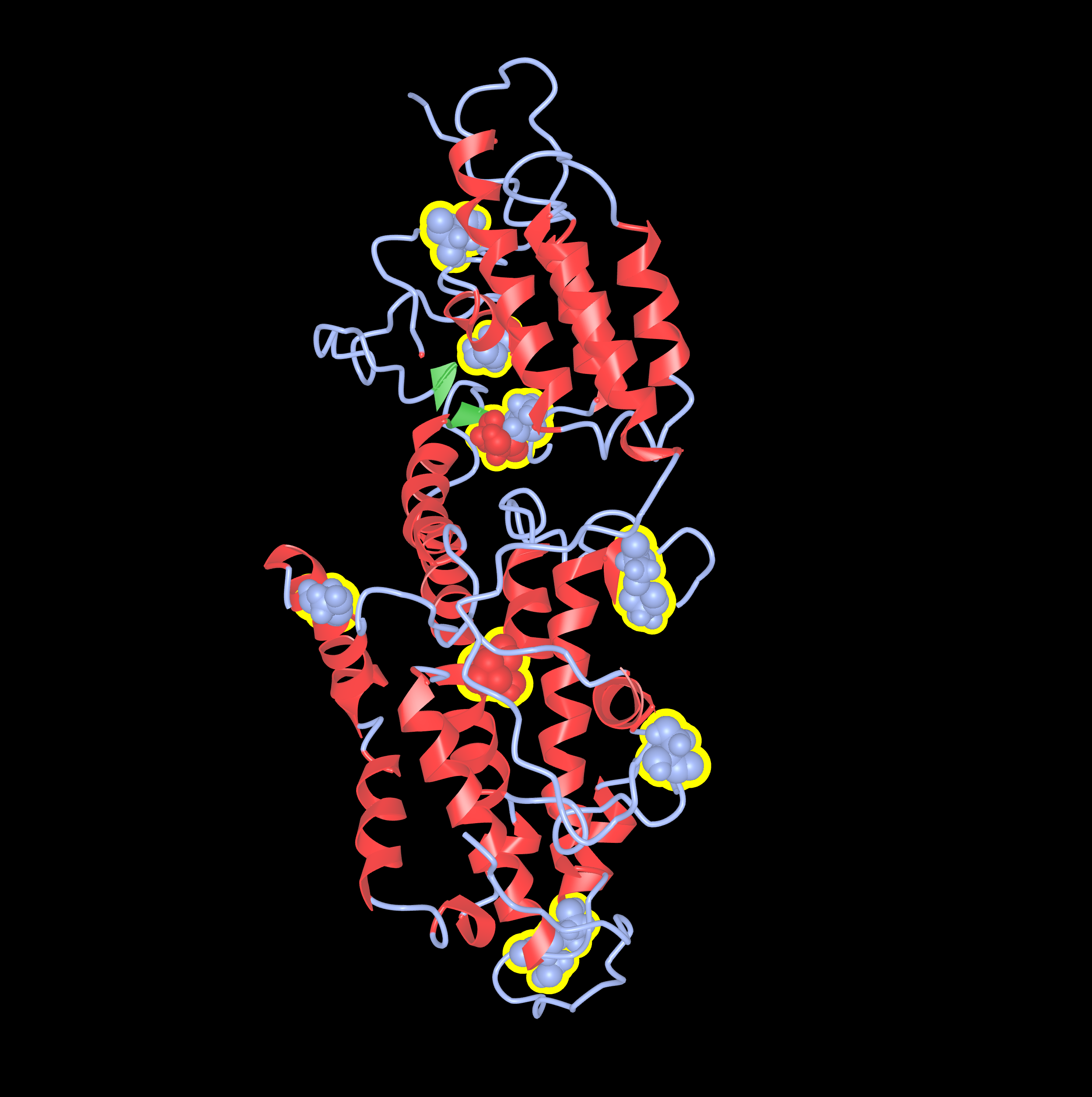
The Human RASGEF1C Protein Tertiary Structure with Secondary Structure and Phosphorylation Sites Highlighted. (Green is Beta Sheets, Red is Alpha Helices, and Spheres Represent Phosphorylation Sites).

The human RASGEF1C protein consists of 8 beta sheets and 268 alpha helices.

== Expression and regulation ==
The RASGEF1C gene is ubiquitously expressed across all tissues, with high expression in the brain and salivary glands.

In humans, the abundance of the RASGEF1C protein is 0.011 ppm

=== Cellular localization ===
The human RASGEF1C protein is localized in the cytoplasm.

=== Post-translational modifications ===
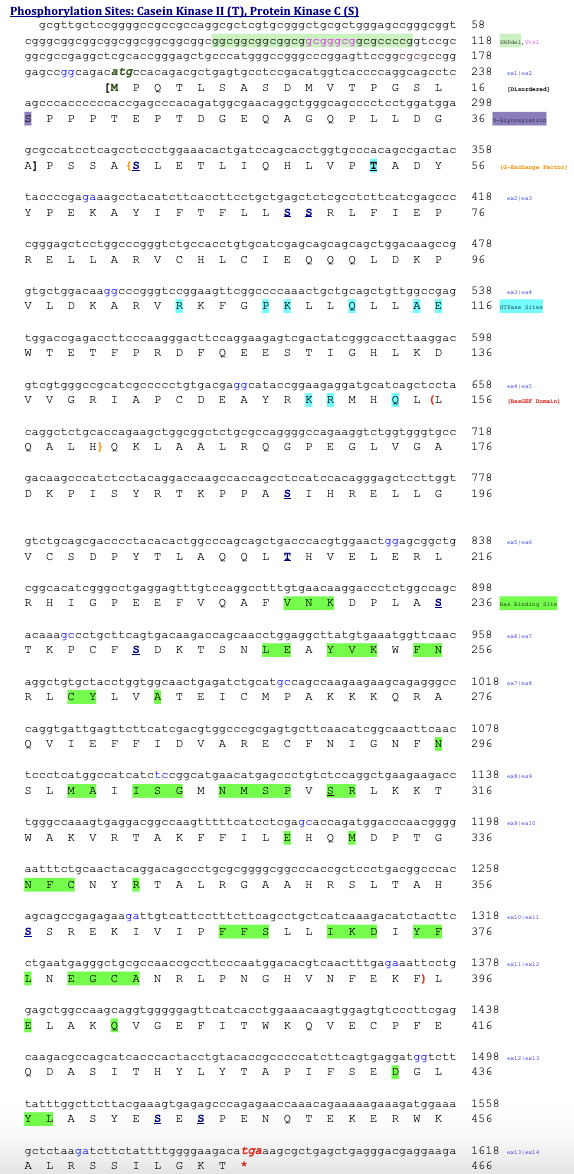
Conceptual Translation of Human RASGEF1C mRNA transcript and protein, highlighting important domains and sites (post-translational modifications, protein binding sites, and SNPs).

The RASGEF1C protein has 11 phosphorylation sites, and one O-glycosylation site.

== Interacting proteins ==
Human RASGEF1C protein is known to interact with TNK2, a tyrosine kinase non-receptor 2, which functions in inhibiting GTPase

== Evolution ==
Human RASGEF1C protein paralogs

The Human RASGEF1C protein has two paralogs in humans, RASGEF1A and RASGEF1B.

Human Protein	Accession Number	Sequence Length (aa)	Identity to Human RASGEF1C Protein (%)	Similarity to Human RASGEF1C Protein (%)
RASGEF1C	NP_778232	466	100	100
RASGEF1B	NP_689758	473	67.7	77.6
RASGEF1A	NP_001269791	489	51.9	67.3

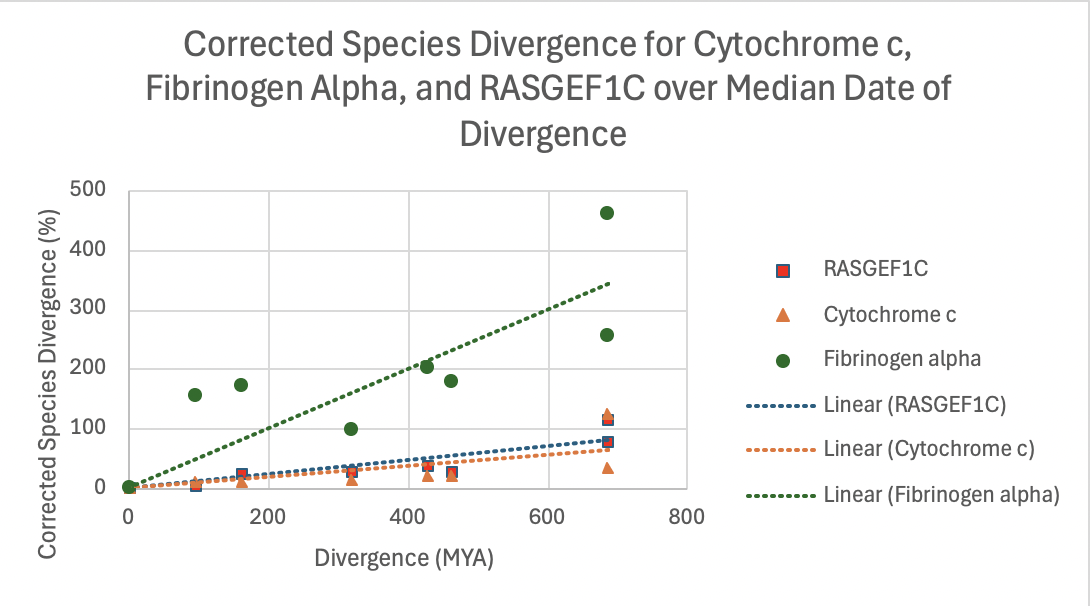
Divergence of RASGEF1C Orthologs, Cytochrome c, and Fibrinogen Alpha from Respective Human Proteins over time in million years ago (MYA).

Human RASGEF1C protein divergence over time

The Human RASGEF1C protein evolved at a slower rate than human fibrinogen alpha, but at a slightly faster rate than cytochrome c over time, having a slow to intermediate rate of evolution over time.

Human RASGEF1C protein orthologs

The Human RASGEF1C protein has orthologs in mammals, marsupials, aves, reptiles, amphibians, fish, insects, and lesser invertebrates. The most distant RASGEF1C ortholog is present in Hood Corals, where divergence of the protein first occurred.

Genus and Species	Common Name	Date of Divergence (MYA)	Accession Number	Sequence Length (aa)	Identity to Human RASGEF1C Protein	Similarity to Human RASGEF1C Protein
Homo sapiens	Humans	0	NP_778232	466	100	100
Felis Catus	Domestic Cat	94	XP_011279828	466	96.6	98.7
Equus caballus	Horse	94	XP_023472779	466	94	92.7
Trichosurus vulpecula	Brushtail Possum	160	XP_036608336	471	84.1	89.9
Sarcophilus harrisii	Tasmanian Devil	160	XP_031809660	501	77.9	83.3
Ficedula albicollis	Collard Flycatcher	319	XP_005053468	472	82	89
Leucopsar rothschildi	Bali Myna	319	NXB51188	475	81.3	88.4
Phoenicopterus ruber	Flamingo	319	KFQ86429	456	75.6	83.4
Emydura macquarii	Australian Shortneck Turtle	319	XP_067422604	472	81.6	88.4
Sphaerodactylus townsendi	Townsend's Least Gecko	319	XP_048347148	473	81.9	89.2
Crocodylus porosus	Saltwater Crocodile	319	XP_019390718.1	516	73.5	80.5
Microcaecilia unicolor	Cayenne Caecilian	352	XP_030067951	471	77.2	85.8
Xenopus laevis	African Clawed Frog	352	XP_041435716	476	66.7	77.6
Hippocampus comes	Tigertail Seahorse	429	XP_019730368	527	68.8	77.3
Heptranchias perlo	Sharpnose Sevengill Shark	462	XP_067851928.1	472	76.4	84.6
Myxine glutinosa	Atlantic Hagfish	563	XP_067981376	466	52.4	66.3
Habropoda laboriosa	Southeastern Blueberry Bee	686	KOC59508	477	50.5	65.9
Leguminivora glycinivorella	Soybean Pod Borer	686	XP_048006501	555	31.3	43.3
Schistocerca piceifrons	Central American Locust	686	XP_047109664	496	49.5	64.5
Mizuhopecten yessoensis	Japanese Weathervane Scallop	686	XP_021342903	497	45.4	59.6
Stylophora pistillata	Hood Coral	686	PFX24589	579	35.4	49.9

== Clinical significance ==
The GCG repeat in the 5'UTR region of the human RASGEF1C gene is known to be naturally selected for during late and on-set neurodegenerative disorders. In addition, the GCG repeat from nucleotide 92 to nucleotide 107 on the 5'UTR is the binding site for the transcription factor Vts1 and the site of a common SNP, resulting in a deletion of the GCG repeat region.
