= Cyclic adenosine monophosphate =

Cellular second messenger

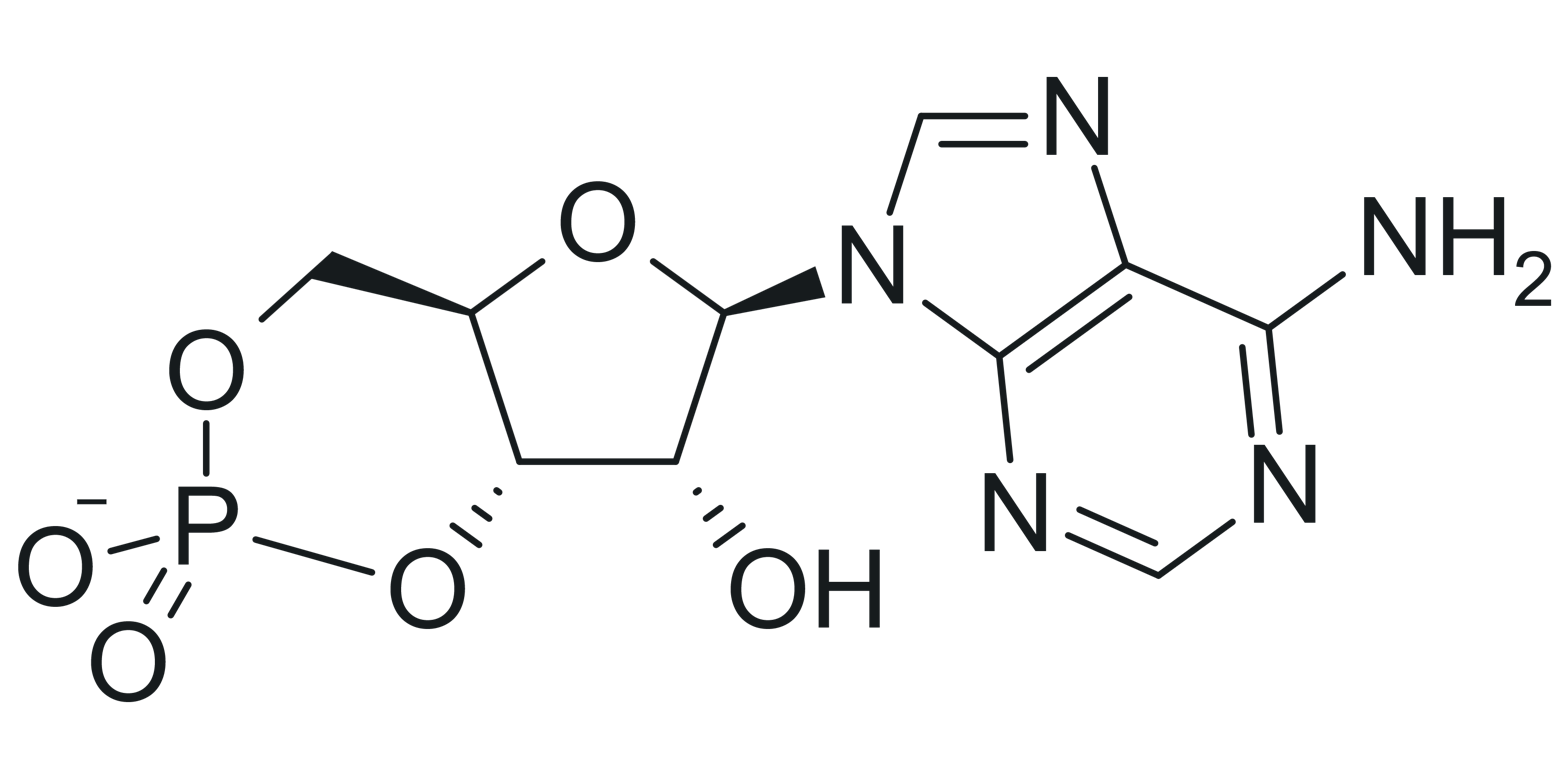

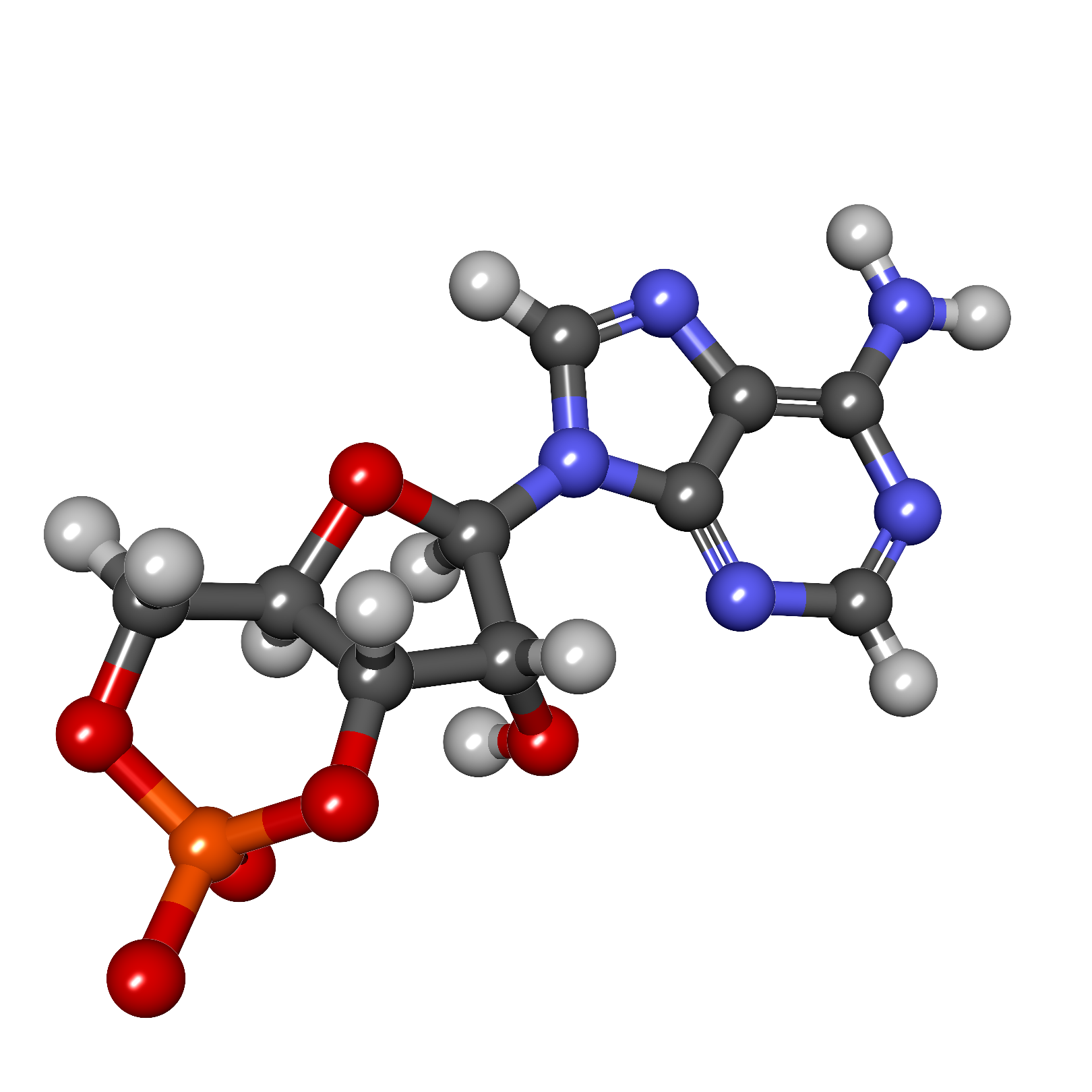

Names
- IUPAC name Adenosine 3′,5′-(hydrogen phosphate)
- Systematic IUPAC name (4aR,6R,7R,7aS)-6-(6-Amino-9H-purin-9-yl)-2,7-dihydroxytetrahydro-2H,4H-2λ^{5}-furo[3,2-d][1,3,2]dioxaphosphinin-2-one

Identifiers
CAS Number	60-92-4
3D model (JSmol)	Interactive image
ChEBI	CHEBI:17489
ChEMBL	ChEMBL316966
ChemSpider	5851
DrugBank	DB02527
ECHA InfoCard	100.000.448
IUPHAR/BPS	2352
KEGG	C00575
MeSH	Cyclic+AMP
PubChem CID	6076
UNII	E0399OZS9N
CompTox Dashboard (EPA)	DTXSID8040436
- InChI: InChI=1S/C10H12N5O6P/c11-8-5-9(13-2-12-8)15(3-14-5)10-6(16)7-4(20-10)1-19-22(17,18)21-7/h2-4,6-7,10,16H,1H2,(H,17,18)(H2,11,12,13)/t4-,6-,7-,10-/m1/s1 Key: IVOMOUWHDPKRLL-KQYNXXCUSA-N; InChI=1/C10H12N5O6P/c11-8-5-9(13-2-12-8)15(3-14-5)10-6(16)7-4(20-10)1-19-22(17,18)21-7/h2-4,6-7,10,16H,1H2,(H,17,18)(H2,11,12,13)/t4-,6-,7-,10-/m1/s1 Key: IVOMOUWHDPKRLL-KQYNXXCUBU
- SMILES: c1nc(c2c(n1)n(cn2)[C@H]3[C@@H]([C@H]4[C@H](O3)COP(=O)(O4)O)O)N

Properties
Chemical formula	C_{10}H_{11}N_{5}O_{6}P
Molar mass	329.206 g/mol
- Except where otherwise noted, data are given for materials in their standard state (at 25 °C [77 °F], 100 kPa). verify (what is ?) Infobox references

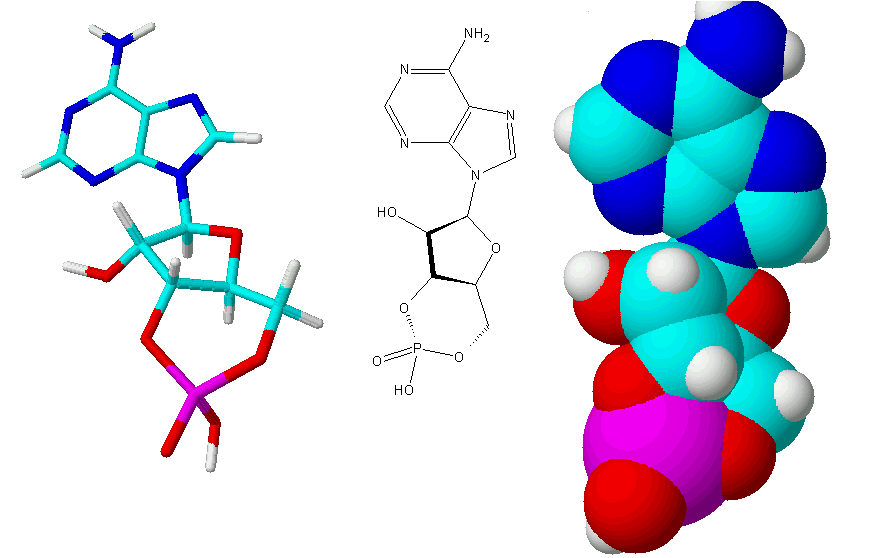
cAMP represented in three ways

Adenosine triphosphate

Cyclic adenosine monophosphate (cAMP, cyclic AMP, or 3',5'-cyclic adenosine monophosphate) is a second messenger, or cellular signal occurring within cells, that is important in many biological processes. cAMP is a derivative of adenosine triphosphate (ATP) and used for intracellular signal transduction in many different organisms, conveying the cAMP-dependent pathway.

== History ==
Earl Sutherland of Vanderbilt University won a Nobel Prize in Physiology or Medicine in 1971 "for his discoveries concerning the mechanisms of the action of hormones", especially epinephrine, via second messengers (such as cyclic adenosine monophosphate, cyclic AMP).

== Synthesis ==
The synthesis of cAMP is stimulated by trophic hormones that bind to receptors on the cell surface. cAMP levels reach maximal levels within minutes and decrease gradually over an hour in cultured cells. Cyclic AMP is synthesized from ATP by adenylyl cyclase located on the inner side of the plasma membrane and anchored at various locations in the interior of the cell. Adenylyl cyclase is activated by a range of signaling molecules through the activation of adenylyl cyclase stimulatory G (G_{s})-protein-coupled receptors. Adenylyl cyclase is inhibited by agonists of adenylyl cyclase inhibitory G (G_{i})-protein-coupled receptors. Liver adenylyl cyclase responds more strongly to glucagon, and muscle adenylyl cyclase responds more strongly to adrenaline.

cAMP decomposition into AMP is catalyzed by the enzyme phosphodiesterase.

== Functions ==
cAMP is a second messenger, used for intracellular signal transduction, such as transferring into cells the effects of hormones like glucagon and adrenaline, which cannot pass through the plasma membrane. It is also involved in the activation of protein kinases. In addition, cAMP binds to and regulates the function of ion channels such as the HCN channels and a few other cyclic nucleotide-binding proteins such as Epac1 and RAPGEF2.

=== Role in eukaryotic cells ===
cAMP is associated with kinases function in several biochemical processes, including the regulation of glycogen, sugar, and lipid metabolism.

In eukaryotes, cyclic AMP works by activating protein kinase A (PKA, or cAMP-dependent protein kinase). PKA is normally inactive as a tetrameric holoenzyme, consisting of two catalytic and two regulatory units (C_{2}R_{2}), with the regulatory units blocking the catalytic centers of the catalytic units.

Cyclic AMP binds to specific locations on the regulatory units of the protein kinase, and causes dissociation between the regulatory and catalytic subunits, thus enabling those catalytic units to phosphorylate substrate proteins.

The active subunits catalyze the transfer of phosphate from ATP to specific serine or threonine residues of protein substrates. The phosphorylated proteins may act directly on the cell's ion channels, or may become activated or inhibited enzymes. Protein kinase A can also phosphorylate specific proteins that bind to promoter regions of DNA, causing increases in transcription. Not all protein kinases respond to cAMP. Several classes of protein kinases, including protein kinase C, are not cAMP-dependent.

Further effects mainly depend on cAMP-dependent protein kinase, which vary based on the type of cell.

Still, there are some minor PKA-independent functions of cAMP, e.g., activation of calcium channels, providing a minor pathway by which growth hormone-releasing hormone causes a release of growth hormone.

However, the view that the majority of the effects of cAMP are controlled by PKA is an outdated one. In 1998 a family of cAMP-sensitive proteins with guanine nucleotide exchange factor (GEF) activity was discovered. These are termed Exchange proteins activated by cAMP (Epac) and the family comprises Epac1 and Epac2. The mechanism of activation is similar to that of PKA: the GEF domain is usually masked by the N-terminal region containing the cAMP binding domain. When cAMP binds, the domain dissociates and exposes the now-active GEF domain, allowing Epac to activate small Ras-like GTPase proteins, such as Rap1.

==== Additional role of secreted cAMP in social amoebae ====
In the species Dictyostelium discoideum, cAMP acts outside the cell as a secreted signal. The chemotactic aggregation of cells is organized by periodic waves of cAMP that propagate between cells over distances as large as several centimetres. The waves are the result of a regulated production and secretion of extracellular cAMP and a spontaneous biological oscillator that initiates the waves at centers of territories.

=== Role in bacteria ===
In bacteria, the level of cAMP varies depending on the medium used for growth. In particular, cAMP is low when glucose is the carbon source. This occurs through inhibition of the cAMP-producing enzyme, adenylyl cyclase, as a side-effect of glucose transport into the cell. The transcription factor cAMP receptor protein (CRP) also called CAP (catabolite gene activator protein) forms a complex with cAMP and thereby is activated to bind to DNA. CRP-cAMP increases expression of a large number of genes, including some encoding enzymes that can supply energy independent of glucose.

cAMP, for example, is involved in the positive regulation of the lac operon. In an environment with a low glucose concentration, cAMP accumulates and binds to the allosteric site on CRP (cAMP receptor protein), a transcription activator protein. The protein assumes its active shape and binds to a specific site upstream of the lac promoter, making it easier for RNA polymerase to bind to the adjacent promoter to start transcription of the lac operon, increasing the rate of lac operon transcription. With a high glucose concentration, the cAMP concentration decreases, and the CRP disengages from the lac operon.

== Pathology ==
Since cyclic AMP is a second messenger and plays vital role in cell signalling, it has been implicated in various disorders but not restricted to the roles given below:

=== Role in human carcinoma ===
Some research has suggested that a deregulation of cAMP pathways and an aberrant activation of cAMP-controlled genes is linked to the growth of some cancers.

=== Role in prefrontal cortex disorders ===
Research suggests that cAMP affects the function of higher-order thinking in the prefrontal cortex through its regulation of ion channels called hyperpolarization-activated cyclic nucleotide-gated channels (HCN). HCN channels will open when exposed to cAMP. Once the HCN channel is open, the electrical activity within the neuron is disrupted and the cell becomes less responsive. This interferes with the function of the prefrontal cortex in working memory tasks. Inhibition of cAMP has been observed to improve spatial working memory.

cAMP is involved in activation of trigeminocervical system leading to neurogenic inflammation and causing migraine.

=== Role in infectious disease agents' pathogenesis ===
Disrupted functioning of cAMP has been noted as one of the mechanisms of several bacterial exotoxins.

They can be subgrouped into two distinct categories:

- Toxins that interfere with enzymes ADP-ribosyl-transferases, and
- invasive adenylyl cyclases.

==== ADP-ribosyl-transferases related toxins ====
- Cholera toxin is an AB toxin that has five B subunits and one A subunit. The toxin acts by the following mechanism: First, the B subunit ring of the cholera toxin binds to GM1 gangliosides on the surface of target cells. If a cell lacks GM1 the toxin most likely binds to other types of glycans, such as Lewis Y and Lewis X, attached to proteins instead of lipids.

== Uses ==
Forskolin is commonly used as a tool in biochemistry to raise levels of cAMP in the study and research of cell physiology.

== See also ==
- Cyclic guanosine monophosphate (cGMP)
- 8-Bromoadenosine 3',5'-cyclic monophosphate (8-Br-cAMP)
- Acrasin specific to chemotactic use in Dictyostelium discoideum.
- phosphodiesterase 4 (PDE 4) which degrades cAMP
