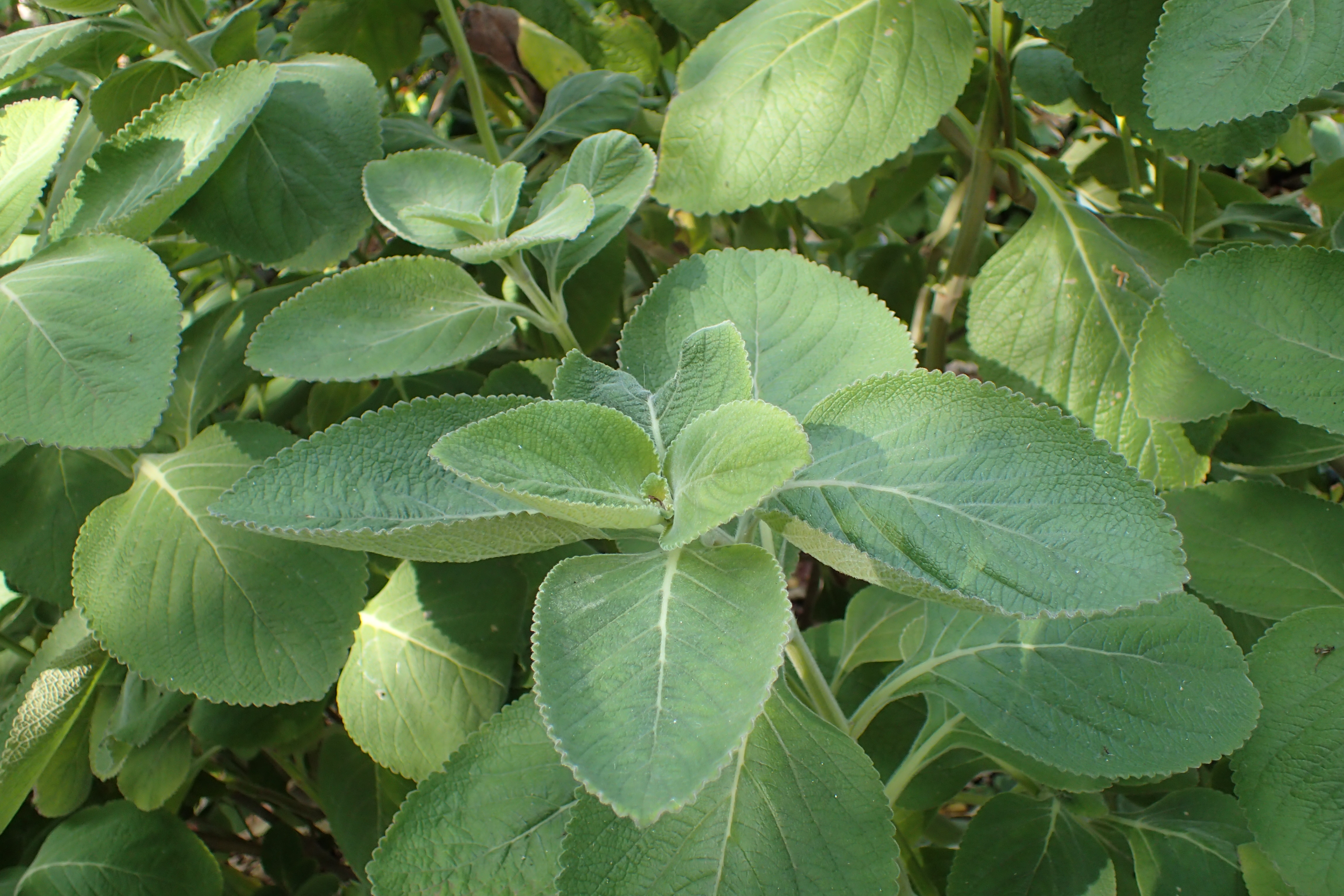

Scientific classification
- Kingdom: Plantae
- Clade: Tracheophytes
- Clade: Angiosperms
- Clade: Eudicots
- Clade: Asterids
- Order: Lamiales
- Family: Lamiaceae
- Genus: Coleus
- Species: C. barbatus

Binomial name
- Coleus barbatus (Andrews) Benth. ex G.Don

Synonyms
- Plectranthus barbatus Andrews

= Coleus barbatus =

Species of plant

Coleus barbatus, also known by the synonyms Plectranthus barbatus and incorrectly Coleus forskalaei (and other spellings of this epithet), is a tropical perennial plant related to the typical coleus species. It is known by the common name woolly plectranthus. It produces forskolin, an extract useful for pharmaceutical preparations and research in cell biology.

== Name ==
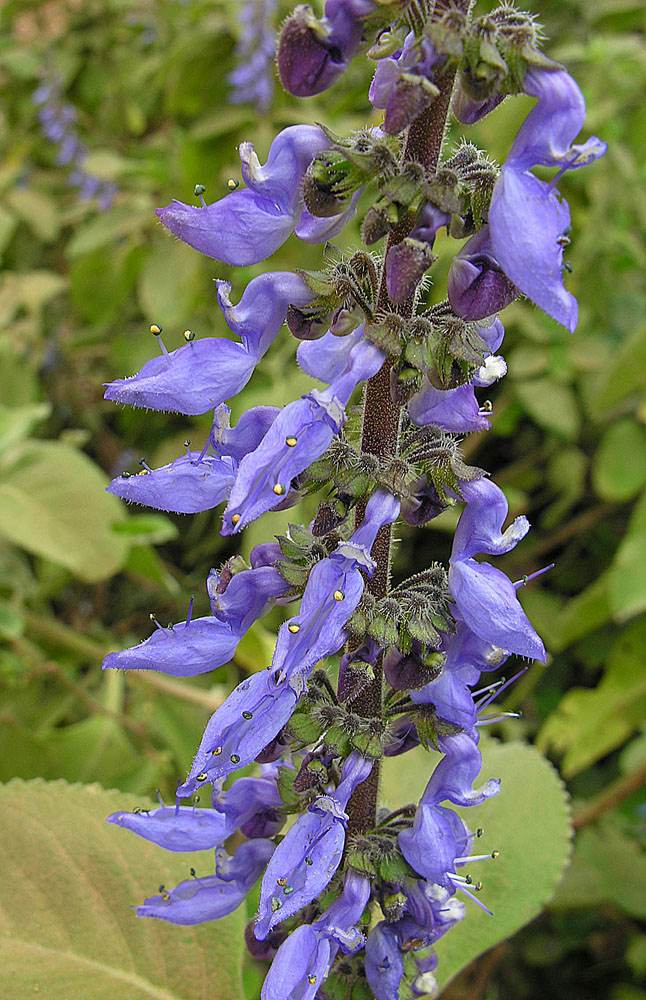
Flowers

The Brazilian name is boldo brasileiro (pronounced [ˈbowdu bɾaziˈlejɾu]), or boldo gaúcho, as opposed to the Chilean true boldo; boldo-da-terra (pronounced [ˈbowdu dɐ ˈtɛʁɐ]); boldo-de-jardim (pronounced [ˈbowdu dʒi ʒaʁˈdʒĩ]); or tapete-de-Oxalá (pronounced [tɐˈpetʃi dʒoʃaˈla]; 'Oxalá's carpet', because of its velvety texture).

In the French Caribbean, it is called "doliprane" (from the brand name of a paracetamol-based drug) because of its uses as a painkiller in folk medicine.

== Description ==
It is a semi-succulent plant that grows as a subshrub to 1.5 m high by 1.5 m wide. The oppositely arranged leaves are relatively large with serrated leaf edges. Purple-blue flowers grow on upright racemose inflorescences that are up to 25 centimeters long.

== Taxonomy ==
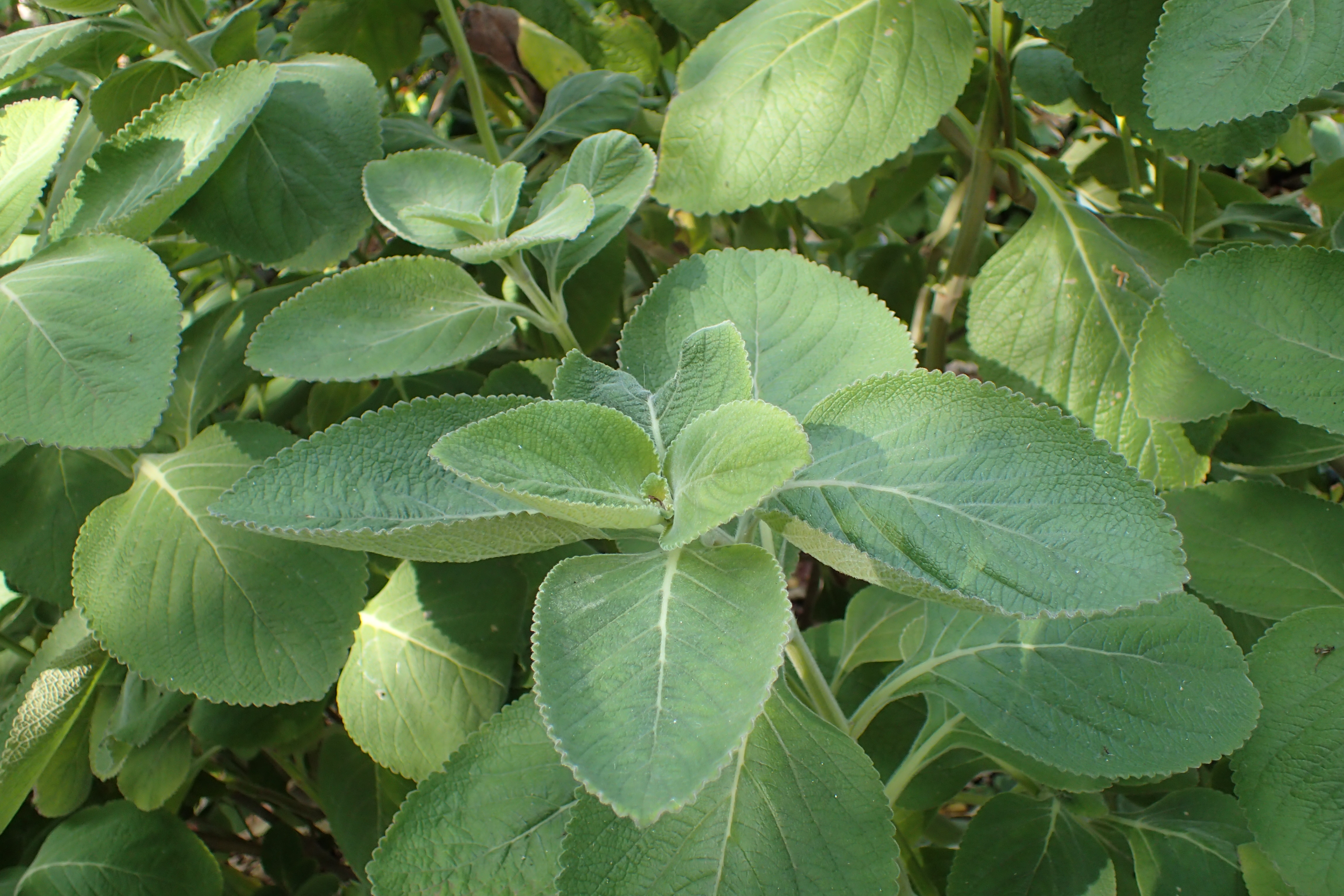
Leaf detail

Coleus barbatus was first described by Henry Cranke Andrews in 1810 as Plectranthus barbatus. It was transferred to Coleus by Bentham in 1830. Although Coleus was previously sunk into Plectranthus, the original binomial was revived in a major study of the subtribe Plectranthinae in 2019.

There has been some confusion over the synonyms of this species. Plectranthus forskaolaei was first described by Vahl in 1790. Vahl's name is illegitimate, because he treats it as a synonym of the earlier described Ocimum hadiense Forrsk. Vahl spelt the epithet as "Forskålaei", referring to Pehr Forsskål, whose surname is also spelt "Forskål". The International Code of Nomenclature for algae, fungi, and plants at Art. 60.7 specifies that "å" is to be replaced by "ao".

Willdenow in 1800 referred to Vahl's name, but spelled the epithet "forskolaei". (As of 31 July 2020, the International Plant Names Index had the spelling "forskalei".) It was probably this species that Briquet referred to when transferring a species to Coleus as "C. forskohlii (Willd.) Briq.", introducing yet another spelling of the epithet; however, Briquet did not explicitly refer to a basionym. Briquet regarded "Coleus forskohlii" as synonymous with what he called "C. barbatus Benth.", although Vahl had originally given a different synonymy. Paton et al. (2019) state that the epithets "forskalaei" or "forskohlii" are incorrectly applied to this species, instead treating binomials with these epithets as synonyms of Coleus hadiensis, in accordance with Vahl's original use.

== Distribution ==
The distribution area extends from tropical Africa across the Arabian Peninsula to parts of South Asia and East Asia. It is native to Burundi, China South-Central, East Himalaya, Eritrea, Ethiopia, India, Kenya, Nepal, Oman, Rwanda, Saudi Arabia, Somalia, Sri Lanka, Sudan, Tanzania, Thailand, Uganda, Yemen and Zaïre.

== Chemistry ==
Chemical structure of forskolin

Herbal teas made from Coleus barbatus contain rosmarinic acid and also flavonoid glucuronides and diterpenoids.

Forskolin, which derives its name from the incorrect binomial name of this plant, Coleus forskohlii, has been isolated from the roots.
