= RAPGEF4 =

Protein-coding gene in the species Homo sapiens

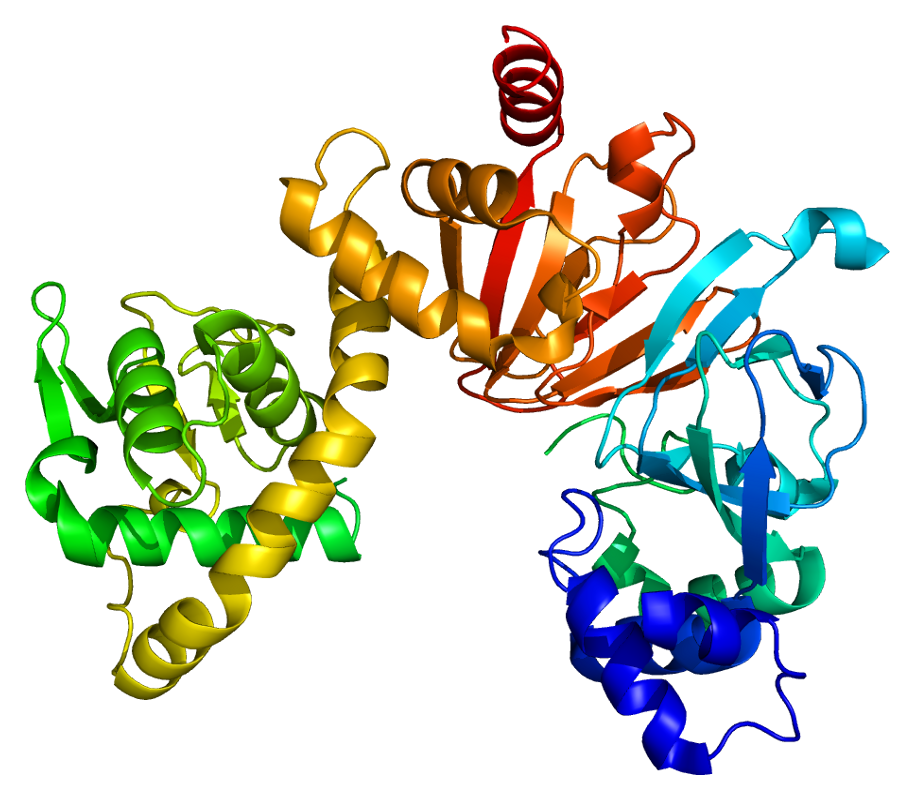

Identifiers
- Aliases: RAPGEF4, CAMP-GEFII, CGEF2, EPAC, EPAC 2, EPAC2, Nbla00496, Rap guanine nucleotide exchange factor 4
- External IDs: OMIM: 606058; MGI: 1917723; GeneCards: RAPGEF4

Gene location (Human)
Chr.	Chromosome 2 (human)
Band	2q31.1	Start	172,735,274 bp
Band	2q31.1	End	173,052,893 bp

Gene location (Mouse)
Chr.	Chromosome 2 (mouse)
Band	2|2 C3	Start	71,811,584 bp
Band	2|2 C3	End	72,087,818 bp
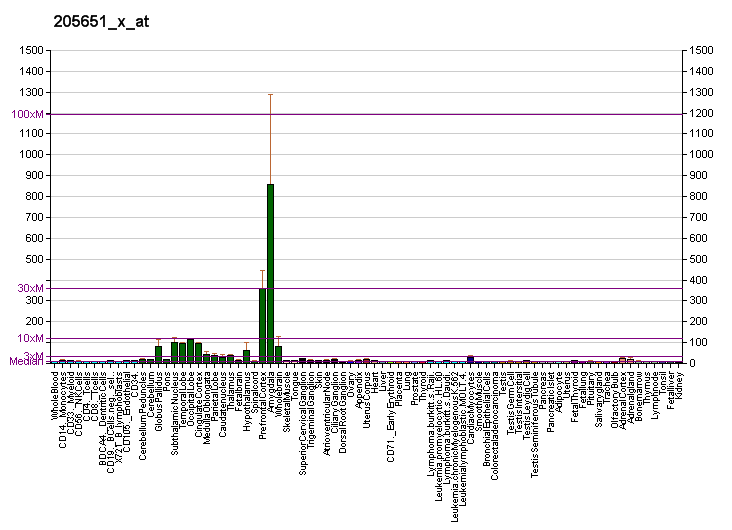
RNA expression pattern
Bgee	Human / Mouse (ortholog); Top expressed in: right frontal lobe; amygdala; dorsolateral prefrontal cortex; prefrontal cortex; Brodmann area 9; cingulate gyrus; hippocampus proper; anterior cingulate cortex; nucleus accumbens; right adrenal gland / Top expressed in: globus pallidus; lateral geniculate nucleus; superior frontal gyrus; dentate gyrus of hippocampal formation granule cell; habenula; prefrontal cortex; nucleus accumbens; anterior amygdaloid area; ventral tegmental area; lobe of cerebellum; More reference expression data
BioGPS	More reference expression data
Gene ontology
Molecular function	nucleotide binding; cAMP binding; protein binding; guanyl-nucleotide exchange factor activity
Cellular component	cytoplasm; cytosol; membrane; plasma membrane; hippocampal mossy fiber to CA3 synapse
Biological process	G protein-coupled receptor signaling pathway; intracellular signal transduction; regulation of insulin secretion; small GTPase mediated signal transduction; insulin secretion; regulation of exocytosis; cAMP-mediated signaling; calcium-ion regulated exocytosis; exocytosis; regulation of synaptic vesicle cycle
Sources:Amigo / QuickGO
Orthologs
Databases	NCBI: entry; OMA: entry
Species	Human	Mouse
Entrez	11069	56508
Ensembl	ENSG00000091428	ENSMUSG00000049044
UniProt	Q8WZA2	Q9EQZ6
RefSeq (mRNA)	NM_001100397; NM_001282899; NM_001282900; NM_001282901; NM_007023	NM_001204165; NM_001204166; NM_001204167; NM_019688; NM_001355478
RefSeq (protein)	NP_001093867; NP_001269828; NP_001269829; NP_001269830; NP_008954 NP_001362793; NP_001362794; NP_001362795; NP_001362796; NP_001362797; NP_001362798; NP_001362799; NP_001362800; NP_001362801; NP_001362802; NP_001362803; NP_001362804; NP_001362805	NP_001191094; NP_001191095; NP_001191096; NP_062662; NP_001342407
Location (UCSC)	Chr 2: 172.74 – 173.05 Mb	Chr 2: 71.81 – 72.09 Mb
PubMed search
- Wikidata
View/Edit Human	View/Edit Mouse

Rap guanine nucleotide exchange factor (GEF) 4 (RAPGEF4), also known as exchange protein directly activated by cAMP 2 (EPAC2) is a protein that in humans is encoded by the RAPGEF4 gene.

Epac2 is a target of cAMP, a major second messenger in various cells. Epac2 is coded by the RAPGEF4 gene, and is expressed mainly in brain, neuroendocrine, and endocrine tissues. Epac2 functions as a guanine nucleotide exchange factor for the Ras-like small GTPase Rap upon cAMP stimulation. Epac2 is involved in a variety of cAMP-mediated cellular functions in endocrine and neuroendocrine cells and neurons.

== Gene and transcripts ==
Human Epac2 is coded by RAPGEF4 located at chromosome 2q31-q32, and three isoforms (Epac2A, Epac2B, and Epac2C) are generated by alternate promoter usage and differential splicing. Epac2A (called Epac2 originally) is a multi-domain protein with 1,011 amino acids, and is expressed mainly in brain and neuroendocrine and endocrine tissues such as pancreatic islets and neuroendocrine cells. Epac2A is composed of two regions, an amino-terminal regulatory region and a carboxy-terminal catalytic region. The regulatory region contains two cyclic nucleotide-binding domains (cNBD-A and cNBD-B) and a DEP (Dishevelled, Egl-10, and Pleckstrin) domain. The catalytic region, which is responsible for the activation of Rap, consists of a CDC25 homology domain (CDC25-HD), a Ras exchange motif (REM) domain, and a Ras association (RA) domain. Epac2B is devoid of the first cNBD-A domain and Epac2C is devoid of a cNBD-A and a DEP domain. Epac2B and Epac2C are expressed specifically in adrenal gland and liver, respectively.

== Mechanism of action ==
The crystal structure reveals that the catalytic region of Epac2 interacts with cNBD-B intramolecularly, and in the absence of cAMP is sterically masked by a regulatory region, which thereby inhibits interaction between the catalytic region and Rap1. The crystal structure of the cAMP analog-bound active form of Epac2 in a complex with Rap1B indicates that the binding of cAMP to the cNBD-B domain induces the dynamic conformational changes that allow the regulatory region to rotate away. This conformational change enables access of Rap1 to the catalytic region and allows activation.

== Specific agonists ==
Several Epac-selective cAMP analogs have been developed to clarify the functional roles of Epacs as well those of the Epac-dependent signaling pathway distinct from the PKA-dependent signaling pathway. The modifications of 8-position in the purine structure and 2'-position in ribose is considered to be crucial to the specificity for Epacs. So far, 8-pCPT-2'-O-Me-cAMP (8-pCPT) and its membrane permeable form 8-pCPT-AM are used for their great specificity toward Epacs. Sulfonylurea drugs (SUs), widely used for the treatment of type 2 diabetes through stimulation of insulin secretion from pancreatic β-cells, have also been shown to specifically activate Epac2.

== Function ==
In pancreatic β-cells, cAMP signaling, which can be activated by various extracellular stimuli including hormonal and neural inputs primarily through Gs-coupled receptors, is of importance for normal regulation of insulin secretion to maintain glucose homeostasis. Activation of cAMP signaling amplifies insulin secretion by Epac2-dependent as well as PKA-dependent pathways. Epac2-Rap1 signaling is critical to promote exocytosis of insulin-containing vesicles from the readily releasable pool. In Epac2-mediated exocytosis of insulin granules, Epac2 interacts with Rim2, which is a scaffold protein localized in both plasma membrane and insulin granules, and determines the docking and priming states of exocytosis. In addition, piccolo, a possible Ca^{2+} sensor protein, interacts with the Epac2-Rim2 complex to regulate cAMP-induced insulin secretion. It is suggested that phospholipase C-ε (PLC-ε), one of the effector proteins of Rap, regulates intracellular Ca^{2+} dynamics by altering the activities of ion channels such as ATP-sensitive potassium channel, ryanodine receptor, and IP3 receptor. In neurons, Epac is involved in neurotransmitter release in glutamatergic synapses from calyx of Held and in crayfish neuromuscular junction. Epac also has roles in the development of brain by regulation of neurite growth and neuronal differentiation as well as axon regeneration in mammalian tissue. Furthermore, Epac2 may regulate synaptic plasticity, and thus control higher brain functions such as memory and learning. In heart, Epac1 is expressed predominantly, and is involved in the development of hypertrophic events by chronic cAMP stimulation through β-adrenergic receptors. In contrast, chronic stimulation of Epac2 may be a cause of cardiac arrhythmia through CaMKII-dependent diastolic sarcoplasmic reticulum (SR) Ca^{2+} release in mice. Epac2 also is involved in GLP-1-stimulated atrial natriuretic peptide (ANP) secretion from heart.

== Clinical implications ==
As Epac2 is involved in many physiological functions in various cells, defects in the Epac2/Rap1 signaling mechanism could contribute to the development of various pathological states. Studies of Epac2 knockout mice indicate that Epac-mediated signaling is required for potentiation of insulin secretion by incretins (gut hormones released from enteroendocrine cells following meal ingestion) such as glucagon-like peptide-1 (GLP-1) and glucose-dependent insulinotropic polypeptide, suggesting that Epac2 is a promising target for treatment of diabetes. In fact, incretin-based diabetes therapies are currently used in clinical practice worldwide; development of Epac2-selective agonists might well lead to the discovery of further novel anti-diabetic drugs. An analog of GLP-1 has been shown to exert a blood pressure-lowering effect by stimulation of atrial natriuretic peptide (ANP) secretion through Epac2. In heart, chronic stimulation of β-adrenergic receptor is known to progress to arrhythmia through an Epac2-dependent mechanism. In brain, up-regulation of Epac1 and down-regulation of Epac2 mRNA are observed in patients with Alzheimer's disease, suggesting roles of Epacs in the disease. An Epac2 rare coding variant is found in patients with autism and could be responsible for the dendritic morphological abnormalities. Thus, Epac2 is involved in the pathogenesis and pathophysiology of various diseases, and represents a promising therapeutic target.
