= Forskolin =

Names
- IUPAC name (13R)-1α,6β,9α-Trihydroxy-11-oxo-8α,13-epoxylabd-14-en-7β-yl acetate
- Systematic IUPAC name (3R,4aR,5S,6S,6aS,10S,10aR,10bS)-3-Ethenyl-6,10,10b-trihydroxy-3,4a,7,7,10a-pentamethyl-1-oxododecahydro-1H-naphtho[2,1-b]pyran-5-yl acetate

Identifiers
CAS Number	66575-29-9
3D model (JSmol)	Interactive image
ChEBI	CHEBI:42471
ChEMBL	ChEMBL52606
ChemSpider	43607
DrugBank	DB02587
ECHA InfoCard	100.060.354
IUPHAR/BPS	5190
PubChem CID	47936
UNII	1F7A44V6OU
CompTox Dashboard (EPA)	DTXSID8040484
- InChI: InChI=1S/C22H34O7/c1-8-19(5)11-14(25)22(27)20(6)13(24)9-10-18(3,4)16(20)15(26)17(28-12(2)23)21(22,7)29-19/h8,13,15-17,24,26-27H,1,9-11H2,2-7H3/t13-,15-,16-,17-,19-,20-,21+,22-/m0/s1 Key: OHCQJHSOBUTRHG-KGGHGJDLSA-N; InChI=1/C22H34O7/c1-8-19(5)11-14(25)22(27)20(6)13(24)9-10-18(3,4)16(20)15(26)17(28-12(2)23)21(22,7)29-19/h8,13,15-17,24,26-27H,1,9-11H2,2-7H3/t13-,15-,16-,17-,19-,20-,21+,22-/m0/s1 Key: OHCQJHSOBUTRHG-KGGHGJDLBB
- SMILES: CC(=O)O[C@H]1[C@H]([C@@H]2[C@]([C@H](CCC2(C)C)O)([C@@]3([C@@]1(O[C@@](CC3=O)(C)C=C)C)O)C)O

Properties
Chemical formula	C_{22}H_{34}O_{7}
Molar mass	410.507 g·mol^{−1}
Solubility	Soluble in organic solvents such as ethanol, chloroform and DMSO
- Except where otherwise noted, data are given for materials in their standard state (at 25 °C [77 °F], 100 kPa). verify (what is ?) Infobox references

Forskolin (coleonol) is a labdane diterpene produced by the plant Coleus barbatus (blue spur flower). Other names include pashanabhedi, Indian coleus, makandi, HL-362, and mao hou qiao rui hua. As with other members of the large diterpene class of plant metabolites, forskolin is derived from geranylgeranyl pyrophosphate (GGPP). Forskolin contains some unique functional elements, including the presence of a tetrahydropyran-derived heterocyclic ring.

Forskolin is commonly used in laboratory research to increase levels of cyclic AMP by stimulation of adenylate cyclase.

The name comes from an obsolete name for the plant, Plectranthus forskolaei (see Coleus barbatus).

== Mechanism of action ==
Forskolin is used in biochemistry experiments to raise levels of cyclic AMP (cAMP) in studies of cell physiology. Forskolin activates the enzyme adenylyl cyclase and increases intracellular levels of cAMP. cAMP is an important second messenger necessary for the proper biological response of cells to hormones and other extracellular signals. It is required for cell communication in the hypothalamus-pituitary gland axis, and for the feedback control of hormones via induction of corticotropin-releasing factor gene transcription. Cyclic AMP acts by activating cAMP-sensitive pathways such as protein kinase A and EPAC1.

== Chemistry ==
It is defined as a category 4 chemical with acute dermal toxicity based on 2012 OSHA Hazard Communication Standard (29 CFR 1910.1200).

=== Derivatives ===
Its derivatives include colforsin daropate, NKH477, and FSK88, which may be more potent than forskolin at raising cAMP. These derivatives may have pharmaceutical utility against bronchoconstriction and heart failure.

=== Chemical synthesis ===
A total chemical synthesis has been reported. The key step of this chemical synthesis is photocyclization of a synthetic intermediate in presence of oxygen and methylene blue, followed by a singlet oxygen Diels-Alder reaction.

== Biosynthesis ==
The heterocyclic ring is synthesized after the formation of the trans-fused carbon ring systems formed by a carbocation mediated cyclization. The remaining tertiary carbocation is quenched by a molecule of water. After deprotonation, the remaining hydroxy group is free to form the heterocyclic ring. This cyclization can occur either by attack of the alcohol oxygen onto the allylic carbocation formed by loss of diphosphate, or by an analogous S_{N}2'-like displacement of the diphosphate. This forms the core ring system A of forskolin.

The remaining modifications of the core ring system A can putatively be understood as a series of cytochrome P450 oxidation reactions to form a polyol which is then further oxidized and esterified to form the ketone and acetate ester moieties seen in forskolin. The full set of nine biosynthetic genes has been expressed in yeast in 2017.

== Weight loss ==
Although forskolin has been used in preliminary weight loss research, the low quality of the studies and inconclusive results prevented any determination of effects. Subsequent laboratory studies have suggested that while forskolin treatment may be an effective avenue for preventing or mitigating diet-induced obesity, this is heavily dependent on the bioavailability of forskolin. Injectable delivery of forskolin-based nanomedicines has shown effective at protecting from the obesogenic effects of high-fat diet in laboratory animals.

== See also ==
- Adenylyl cyclase
- Cyclic AMP
