= RASGEF1A =

Protein-coding gene in the species Homo sapiens

Identifiers
- Aliases: RASGEF1A, CG4853, RasGEF domain family member 1A
- External IDs: OMIM: 614531; MGI: 1917977; GeneCards: RASGEF1A

Gene location (Human)
Chr.	Chromosome 10 (human)
Band	10q11.21	Start	43,194,535 bp
Band	10q11.21	End	43,267,065 bp

Gene location (Mouse)
Chr.	Chromosome 6 (mouse)
Band	6|6 F1	Start	117,988,399 bp
Band	6|6 F1	End	118,068,507 bp
RNA expression pattern
Bgee	Human / Mouse (ortholog); Top expressed in: endothelial cell; Brodmann area 23; middle temporal gyrus; entorhinal cortex; Brodmann area 46; postcentral gyrus; superior frontal gyrus; external globus pallidus; cerebellar vermis; pars compacta / Top expressed in: piriform cortex; olfactory tubercle; superior frontal gyrus; visual cortex; anterior amygdaloid area; nucleus accumbens; lateral septal nucleus; primary visual cortex; primary motor cortex; dentate gyrus of hippocampal formation granule cell; More reference expression data
BioGPS	n/a
Gene ontology
Molecular function	guanyl-nucleotide exchange factor activity
Cellular component	cytosol
Biological process	positive regulation of Ras protein signal transduction; cell migration; MAPK cascade; small GTPase mediated signal transduction
Sources:Amigo / QuickGO
Orthologs
Databases	NCBI: entry; OMA: entry
Species	Human	Mouse
Entrez	221002	70727
Ensembl	ENSG00000198915	ENSMUSG00000030134
UniProt	Q8N9B8	n/a
RefSeq (mRNA)	NM_001282862; NM_145313	NM_027526; NM_001316749; NM_001362103; NM_001362104; NM_001362105
RefSeq (protein)	NP_001269791; NP_660356	n/a
Location (UCSC)	Chr 10: 43.19 – 43.27 Mb	Chr 6: 117.99 – 118.07 Mb
PubMed search
- Wikidata
View/Edit Human	View/Edit Mouse

RasGEF domain family, member 1A is a protein that in humans is encoded by the RASGEF1A gene.
