= C1 domain =

Phorbol esters/diacylglycerol binding domain (C1 domain)
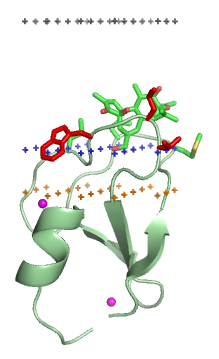
- C1 domain of PKC-delta (1ptr) Middle plane of the lipid bilayer - black dots. Boundary of the hydrocarbon core region - blue dots (cytoplasmic side). Layer of lipid phosphates - yellow dots.

Identifiers
- Symbol: C1
- Pfam: PF00130
- InterPro: IPR002219
- SMART: C1
- PROSITE: PDOC00379
- SCOP2: 2cpk / SCOPe / SUPFAM
- OPM superfamily: 60
- OPM protein: 1ptr
- CDD: cd00029
Available protein structures:
- Pfam: structures / ECOD
- PDB: RCSB PDB; PDBe; PDBj
- PDBsum: structure summary

C1 domain (also known as phorbol esters/diacylglycerol binding domain) binds an important secondary messenger diacylglycerol (DAG), as well as the analogous phorbol esters. Phorbol esters can directly stimulate protein kinase C, PKC.

Phorbol esters (such as PMA) are analogues of DAG and potent tumor promoters that cause a variety of physiological changes when administered to both cells and tissues. DAG activates a family of serine/threonine protein kinases, collectively known as protein kinase C (PKC). Phorbol esters can directly stimulate PKC.

The N-terminal region of PKC, known as C1, binds PMA and DAG in a phospholipid and zinc-dependent fashion. The C1 region contains one or two copies of a cysteine-rich domain, which is about 50 amino-acid residues long, and which is essential for DAG/PMA-binding.

The DAG/PMA-binding domain binds two zinc ions; the ligands of these metal ions are probably the six cysteines and two histidines that are conserved in this domain.

== Human proteins containing this domain ==
AKAP13; ARAF; ARHGAP29; ARHGEF2; BRAF; CDC42BPA; CDC42BPB; CDC42BPG; CHN1; CHN2; CIT; CIC; DGKA; DGKB; DGKD; DGKE; DGKG; DGKH; DGKI; DGKK; DGKQ; DGKZ; GMIP; HMHA1; KSR1; KSR2; MYO9A; MYO9B; PDZD8; PRKCA; PRKCB1; PRKCD; PRKCE; PRKCG; PRKCH; PRKCI; PRKCN; PRKCQ; PRKCZ; PRKD1; PRKD2; PRKD3; RACGAP1; RAF1; RASGRP; RASGRP1; RASGRP2; RASGRP3; RASGRP4; RASSF1; RASSF5; ROCK1; ROCK2; STAC; STAC2; STAC3; TENC1; UNC13A; UNC13B; UNC13C; VAV1; VAV2; VAV3;
