= RasGEF domain =

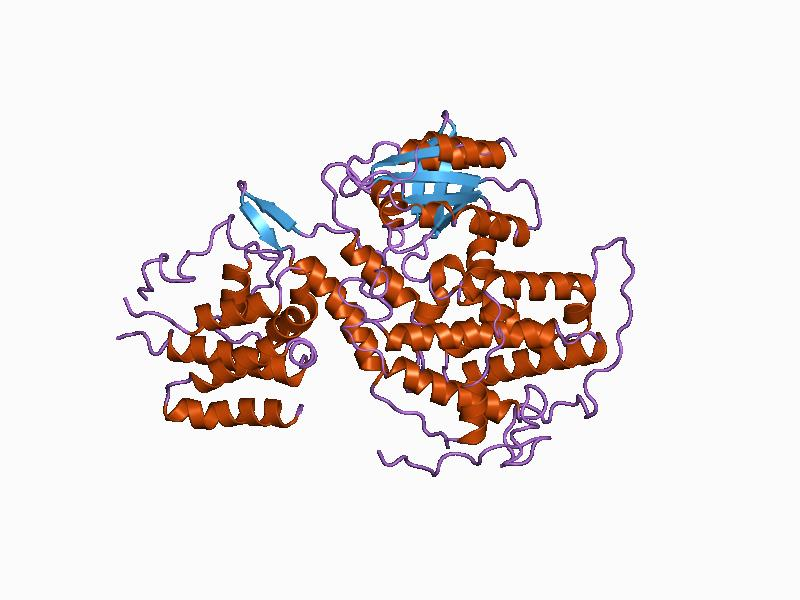
- Structure of human H-Ras.

Identifiers
- Symbol: RasGEF
- Pfam: PF00617
- InterPro: IPR001895
- SMART: RasGEF
- PROSITE: PDOC00594
- SCOP2: 1bkd / SCOPe / SUPFAM
- OPM protein: 1xd4
- CDD: cd00155
Available protein structures:
- PDB: 1xd2C:777-963 1bkdS:777-963 1xdvB:777-963 1nvwS:777-963 1xd4A:777-963 1nvuS:777-963 1nvvS:777-963 1nvxS:777-963 IPR001895 PF00617 (ECOD; PDBsum)
- AlphaFold: IPR001895; PF00617

RasGEF domain is domain found in the CDC25 family of guanine nucleotide exchange factors for Ras-like small GTPases.

Ras proteins are membrane-associated molecular switches that bind GTP and GDP and slowly hydrolyze GTP to GDP. The balance between the GTP bound (active) and GDP bound (inactive) states is regulated by the opposite action of proteins activating the GTPase activity and that of proteins which promote the loss of bound GDP and the uptake of fresh GTP. The latter proteins are known as guanine-nucleotide dissociation stimulators (GDSs) (or also as guanine-nucleotide releasing (or exchange) factors (GRFs)). Proteins that act as GDS can be classified into at least two families, on the basis of sequence similarities, the CDC24 family (see InterPro: IPR001331) and this CDC25 (RasGEF) family.

The size of the proteins of the CDC25 family range from 309 residues (LTE1) to 1596 residues (sos). The sequence similarity shared by all these proteins is limited to a region of about 250 amino acids generally located in their C-terminal section (currently the only exceptions are sos and ralGDS where this domain makes up the central part of the protein). This domain has been shown, in CDC25 an SCD25, to be essential for the activity of these proteins.

== Human proteins containing this domain ==
KNDC1; PLCE1; RALGDS; RALGPS1; RALGPS2; RAPGEF1; RAPGEF2; RAPGEF3; RAPGEF4; RAPGEF5; RAPGEF6; RAPGEFL1; RASGEF1A; RASGEF1B; RASGEF1C; RASGRF1; RASGRF2; RASGRP1; RASGRP2; RASGRP3; RASGRP4; RGL1; RGL2; RGL3; RGL4/RGR; SOS1; SOS2;
