= RGL =

RGL and similar may refer to:

- RijnGouweLijn, a proposed light rail project in South Holland, Netherlands
- Piloto Civil Norberto Fernández International Airport (IATA code), Río Gallegos, Santa Cruz Province, Argentina
- Rugeley Trent Valley railway station (National Rail code), Staffordshire, England
- RGL2, a human gene that makes the protein "Ral guanine nucleotide dissociation stimulator-like 2"
- RGL4, a bacterial gene that makes the enzyme Rhamnogalacturonan endolyase
- RGLI, the Royal Guernsey Light Infantry, a WWI army regiment
- RGL Music Productions B.V.
- Rockstar Games Launcher
