= Diglyceride kinase =

Diglyceride kinase may refer to:

- Diacylglycerol kinase (CTP dependent), an enzyme
- Diacylglycerol kinase, an enzyme
