= PLCE =

PLCE may refer to:

- Personal Load Carrying Equipment, a tactical webbing system of the British Armed Forces
- PLCE1, an enzyme
