= Diacylglycerol kinase (CTP dependent) =

Identifiers
- EC no.: 2.7.1.174

Databases
- BRENDA: enzyme data
- ExPASy: NiceZyme view
- KEGG: enzyme entry
- MetaCyc: metabolic pathway
- Rhea: reactions
- PDB structures: RCSB PDB PDBe PDBsum
Search
- PMC: articles
- PubMed: articles
- NCBI: proteins

Diacylglycerol kinase (CTP dependent) (EC 2.7.1.174, DAG kinase, CTP-dependent diacylglycerol kinase, diglyceride kinase) is an enzyme with systematic name CTP:1,2-diacyl-sn-glycerol 3-phosphotransferase. This enzyme catalyses the following chemical reaction

CTP + 1,2-diacyl-sn-glycerol $\rightleftharpoons$ CDP + 1,2-diacyl-sn-glycerol 3-phosphate

This enzyme requires Ca^{2+} or Mg^{2+} for activity.

== See also ==
- Diacylglycerol kinase
