= DGKA =

Protein-coding gene in humans

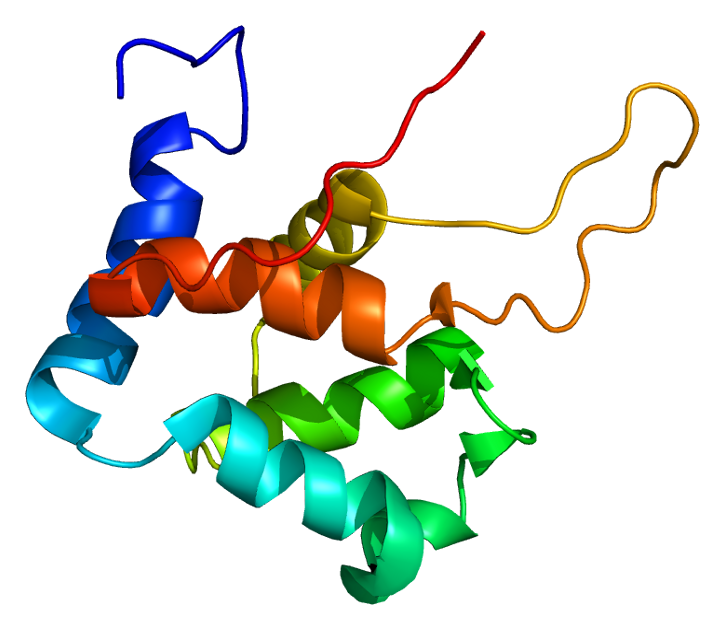

Identifiers
- Aliases: DGKA, DAGK, DAGK1, DGK-alpha, diacylglycerol kinase alpha
- External IDs: OMIM: 125855; MGI: 102952; GeneCards: DGKA
Available structures
PDB	Ortholog search: PDBe RCSB
PDB	List of PDB id codes 1TUZ
Enzyme activity
EC #	BRENDA	ExPASy	KEGG	MetaCyc
2.7.1.93	↗	↗	↗	↗
2.7.1.107	↗	↗	↗	↗

Gene location (Human)
Chr.	Chromosome 12 (human)
Band	12q13.2	Start	55,927,319 bp
Band	12q13.2	End	55,954,027 bp

Gene location (Mouse)
Chr.	Chromosome 10 (mouse)
Band	10 D3|10 77.14 cM	Start	128,556,003 bp
Band	10 D3|10 77.14 cM	End	128,580,724 bp
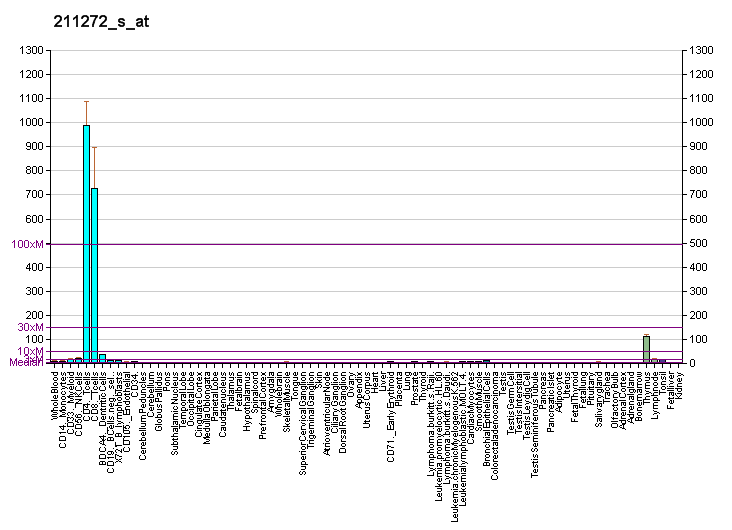

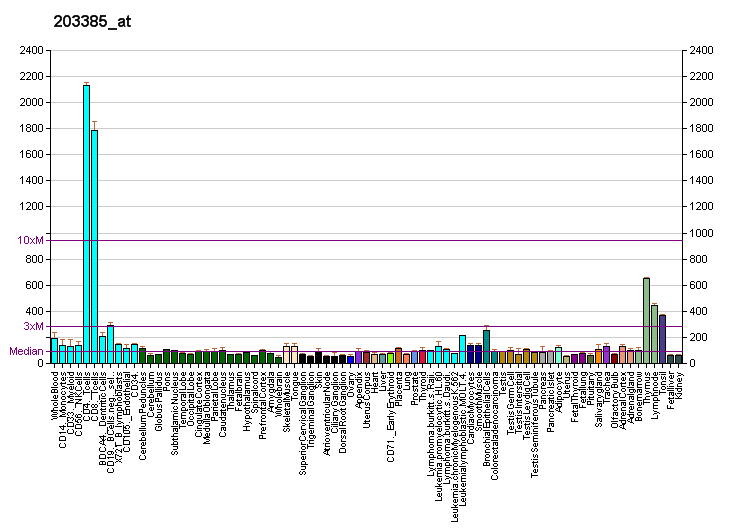
RNA expression pattern
Bgee	Human / Mouse (ortholog); Top expressed in: skin of abdomen; skin of leg; granulocyte; spleen; lymph node; mucosa of transverse colon; minor salivary glands; olfactory zone of nasal mucosa; tonsil; rectum / Top expressed in: thymus; lymph node; corneal stroma; mesenteric lymph nodes; blood; spleen; spermatid; granulocyte; colon; left colon; More reference expression data
BioGPS	More reference expression data
Gene ontology
Molecular function	transferase activity; nucleotide binding; calcium ion binding; phospholipid binding; ATP binding; metal ion binding; kinase activity; diacylglycerol kinase activity; NAD+ kinase activity
Cellular component	cytosol; plasma membrane; membrane; intracellular anatomical structure
Biological process	platelet activation; protein kinase C-activating G protein-coupled receptor signaling pathway; intracellular signal transduction; phosphorylation; glycerolipid metabolic process; phosphatidic acid biosynthetic process; diacylglycerol metabolic process; lipid phosphorylation; metabolism; signal transduction
Sources:Amigo / QuickGO
Orthologs
Databases	NCBI: entry; OMA: entry
Species	Human	Mouse
Entrez	1606	13139
Ensembl	ENSG00000065357	ENSMUSG00000025357
UniProt	P23743	O88673
RefSeq (mRNA)	NM_001345; NM_201444; NM_201445; NM_201554; NM_001351033 NM_001351034; NM_001351035; NM_001351036; NM_001351037; NM_001351038; NM_001351039; NM_001351040	NM_016811; NM_001358745; NM_001358746; NM_001372366; NM_001374028
RefSeq (protein)	NP_001336; NP_958852; NP_958853; NP_963848; NP_001337962 NP_001337963; NP_001337964; NP_001337965; NP_001337966; NP_001337967; NP_001337968; NP_001337969	NP_058091; NP_001345674; NP_001345675; NP_001359295; NP_001360957
Location (UCSC)	Chr 12: 55.93 – 55.95 Mb	Chr 10: 128.56 – 128.58 Mb
PubMed search
- Wikidata
View/Edit Human	View/Edit Mouse

Diacylglycerol kinase alpha is an enzyme that in humans is encoded by the DGKA gene.

The protein encoded by this gene belongs to the eukaryotic diacylglycerol kinase family. It acts as a modulator that competes with protein kinase C for the second messenger diacylglycerol in intracellular signaling pathways. It also plays an important role in the resynthesis of phosphatidylinositols and phosphorylating diacylglycerol to phosphatidic acid. Alternative splicing occurs at this locus and four transcript variants encoding the same protein have been identified.
