= DGKB =

Mammalian protein found in Homo sapiens

Identifiers
- Aliases: DGKB, DAGK2, DGK, DGK-BETA, diacylglycerol kinase beta
- External IDs: OMIM: 604070; MGI: 2442474; GeneCards: DGKB
Enzyme activity
EC #	BRENDA	ExPASy	KEGG	MetaCyc
2.7.1.107	↗	↗	↗	↗

Gene location (Mouse)
Chr.	Chromosome 12 (mouse)
Band	12|12 A3	Start	37,867,725 bp
Band	12|12 A3	End	38,684,238 bp
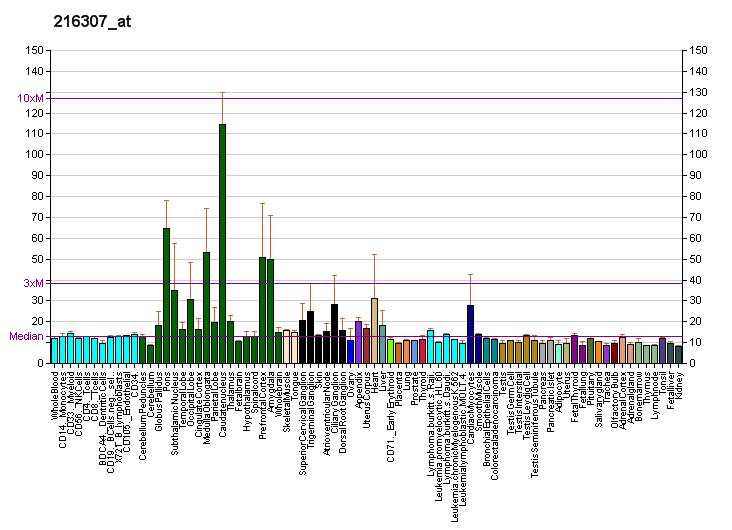
RNA expression pattern
Bgee	Human / Mouse (ortholog); n/a / Top expressed in: dorsal striatum; olfactory tubercle; mammillary body; dentate gyrus of hippocampal formation granule cell; superior frontal gyrus; piriform cortex; globus pallidus; nucleus accumbens; lateral septal nucleus; temporal lobe
BioGPS	More reference expression data
Gene ontology
Molecular function	transferase activity; nucleotide binding; calcium ion binding; ATP binding; metal ion binding; kinase activity; diacylglycerol kinase activity; NAD+ kinase activity
Cellular component	cytoplasm; nucleus; cytosol; plasma membrane; Schaffer collateral - CA1 synapse; glutamatergic synapse
Biological process	platelet activation; protein kinase C-activating G protein-coupled receptor signaling pathway; intracellular signal transduction; phosphorylation; glycerolipid metabolic process; lipid phosphorylation; metabolism; signal transduction; response to bacterium; modulation of chemical synaptic transmission; regulation of postsynapse organization; diacylglycerol metabolic process
Sources:Amigo / QuickGO
Orthologs
Databases	NCBI: entry; OMA: entry
Species	Human	Mouse
Entrez	1607	217480
Ensembl	ENSG00000136267	ENSMUSG00000036095
UniProt	Q9Y6T7	Q6NS52
RefSeq (mRNA)	NM_004080; NM_145695	NM_178681; NM_001361686; NM_001361688
RefSeq (protein)	NP_663733; NP_001337634; NP_001337635; NP_001337636; NP_001337637 NP_001337638; NP_001337640; NP_001337641; NP_001337643; NP_001337644; NP_001337645; NP_001337646; NP_001337647; NP_001337648; NP_001337649; NP_001337650; NP_001337651; NP_001337652; NP_001337653	NP_848796; NP_001348615; NP_001348617
Location (UCSC)	n/a	Chr 12: 37.87 – 38.68 Mb
PubMed search
- Wikidata
View/Edit Human	View/Edit Mouse

Diacylglycerol kinase beta is an enzyme that in humans is encoded by the DGKB gene.

== Function ==
Diacylglycerol kinases (DGKs) are regulators of the intracellular concentration of the second messenger diacylglycerol (DAG) and thus play a key role in cellular processes. Nine mammalian isotypes have been identified, which are encoded by separate genes. Mammalian DGK isozymes contain a conserved catalytic (kinase) domain and a cysteine-rich domain (CRD). The protein encoded by this gene is a diacylglycerol kinase, beta isotype. Two alternatively spliced transcript variants have been found for this gene.
