= DGKG =

Protein-coding gene in the species Homo sapiens

Identifiers
- Aliases: DGKG, DAGK3, DGK-GAMMA, diacylglycerol kinase gamma
- External IDs: OMIM: 601854; MGI: 105060; GeneCards: DGKG
Enzyme activity
| EC # | BRENDA | ExPASy | KEGG | MetaCyc |
|---|---|---|---|---|
| 2.7.1.107 | ↗ | ↗ | ↗ | ↗ |

Gene location (Human)
| Chr. | Chromosome 3 (human) |
| Band | 3q27.2-q27.3 | Start | 186,105,668 bp |
| Band | 3q27.2-q27.3 | End | 186,362,234 bp |

Gene location (Mouse)
| Chr. | Chromosome 16 (mouse) |
| Band | 16 B1|16 13.37 cM | Start | 22,287,211 bp |
| Band | 16 B1|16 13.37 cM | End | 22,475,971 bp |
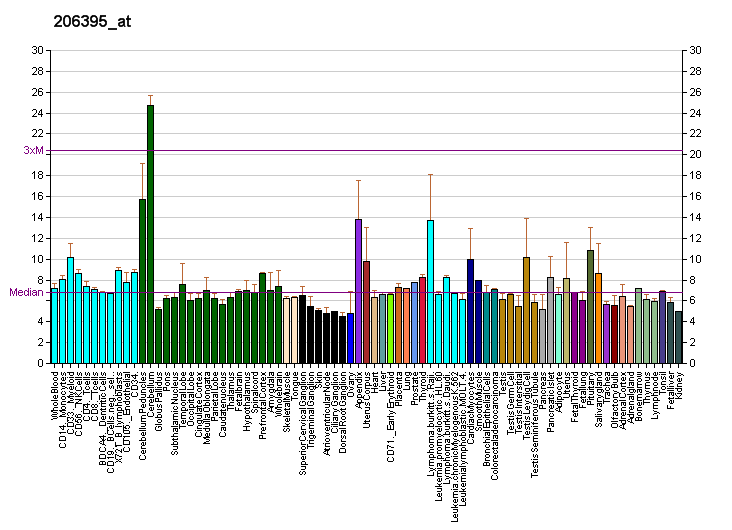
RNA expression pattern
| Bgee | Human / Mouse (ortholog); Top expressed in: cerebellar cortex; cerebellar hemisphere; right hemisphere of cerebellum; buccal mucosa cell; gastric mucosa; monocyte; cingulate gyrus; anterior cingulate cortex; left ventricle; apex of heart / Top expressed in: subiculum; dentate gyrus of hippocampal formation granule cell; lobe of cerebellum; lateral septal nucleus; hippocampus proper; cerebellar vermis; granulocyte; anterior amygdaloid area; piriform cortex; pontine nuclei; More reference expression data |
| BioGPS | More reference expression data |
Gene ontology
| Molecular function | transferase activity; nucleotide binding; calcium ion binding; ATP binding; metal ion binding; kinase activity; diacylglycerol kinase activity; NAD+ kinase activity |
| Cellular component | cytoplasm; plasma membrane; membrane |
| Biological process | platelet activation; protein kinase C-activating G protein-coupled receptor signaling pathway; intracellular signal transduction; neuron development; phosphorylation; glycerolipid metabolic process; lipid phosphorylation; metabolism; signal transduction; diacylglycerol metabolic process |
Sources:Amigo / QuickGO
Orthologs
| Databases | NCBI: entry; OMA: entry |
| Species | Human | Mouse |
| Entrez | 1608 | 110197 |
| Ensembl | ENSG00000058866 | ENSMUSG00000022861 |
| UniProt | P49619 | Q91WG7 |
| RefSeq (mRNA) | NM_001346; NM_001080744; NM_001080745 | NM_138650; NM_001346673 |
| RefSeq (protein) | NP_001074213; NP_001074214; NP_001337 | NP_001333602; NP_619591 |
| Location (UCSC) | Chr 3: 186.11 – 186.36 Mb | Chr 16: 22.29 – 22.48 Mb |
| PubMed search |
- Wikidata
| View/Edit Human | View/Edit Mouse |

Diacylglycerol kinase gamma is an enzyme that in humans is encoded by the DGKG gene.

This gene encodes an enzyme that is a member of the type I subfamily of diacylglycerol kinases, which are involved in lipid metabolism. These enzymes generate phosphatidic acid by catalyzing the phosphorylation of diacylglycerol, a fundamental lipid second messenger that activates numerous proteins, including protein kinase C isoforms, Ras guanyl nucleotide-releasing proteins and some transient receptor potential channels. Diacylglycerol kinase gamma has been implicated in cell cycle regulation and in the negative regulation of macrophage differentiation in leukemia cells. Multiple transcript variants encoding different isoforms have been found for this gene.
