= CDC42 binding protein kinase beta =

Protein-coding gene in humans

CDC42BPB

Identifiers
- Aliases: CDC42BPB, MRCKB, CDC42 binding protein kinase beta, CHOCNS
- External IDs: OMIM: 614062; MGI: 2136459; GeneCards: CDC42BPB
Available structures
PDB	Ortholog search: PDBe RCSB
PDB	List of PDB id codes 3QFV, 3TKU, 4UAK, 4UAL
Enzyme activity
EC #	BRENDA	ExPASy	KEGG	MetaCyc
2.7.11.1	↗	↗	↗	↗

Gene location (Human)
Chr.	Chromosome 14 (human)
Band	14q32.32	Start	102,932,380 bp
Band	14q32.32	End	103,057,549 bp

Gene location (Mouse)
Chr.	Chromosome 12 (mouse)
Band	12 F1|12 60.94 cM	Start	111,259,410 bp
Band	12 F1|12 60.94 cM	End	111,344,152 bp
RNA expression pattern
Bgee	Human / Mouse (ortholog); Top expressed in: stromal cell of endometrium; gastric mucosa; body of uterus; right frontal lobe; right hemisphere of cerebellum; anterior pituitary; left ovary; prefrontal cortex; ectocervix; canal of the cervix / Top expressed in: zygote; otic vesicle; secondary oocyte; genital tubercle; primary visual cortex; superior frontal gyrus; yolk sac; tail of embryo; superior cervical ganglion; dentate gyrus of hippocampal formation granule cell; More reference expression data
BioGPS	n/a
Gene ontology
Molecular function	transferase activity; protein kinase activity; nucleotide binding; metal ion binding; kinase activity; protein serine/threonine kinase activity; ATP binding; magnesium ion binding; protein-containing complex binding; protein binding
Cellular component	cytoplasm; membrane; cell-cell junction; plasma membrane; cell junction; cell leading edge; actomyosin; cytoskeleton; extracellular exosome; lamellipodium; cell projection
Biological process	intracellular signal transduction; phosphorylation; actomyosin structure organization; establishment or maintenance of cell polarity; protein phosphorylation; cytoskeleton organization; cell migration; signal transduction; actin cytoskeleton organization; actin cytoskeleton reorganization; peptidyl-threonine phosphorylation
Sources:Amigo / QuickGO
Orthologs
Databases	NCBI: entry; OMA: entry
Species	Human	Mouse
Entrez	9578	217866
Ensembl	ENSG00000198752	ENSMUSG00000021279
UniProt	Q9Y5S2; Q86XZ8	Q7TT50
RefSeq (mRNA)	NM_006035	NM_183016
RefSeq (protein)	NP_006026; NP_006026.3	NP_898837
Location (UCSC)	Chr 14: 102.93 – 103.06 Mb	Chr 12: 111.26 – 111.34 Mb
PubMed search
- Wikidata
View/Edit Human	View/Edit Mouse

CDC42 binding protein kinase beta is a protein that in humans is encoded by the CDC42BPB gene.

== Function ==
This gene encodes a member of the serine/threonine protein kinase family. The encoded protein contains a Cdc42/Rac-binding p21 binding domain resembling that of PAK kinase. The kinase domain of this protein is most closely related to that of myotonic dystrophy kinase-related ROK. Studies of the similar gene in rats suggested that this kinase may act as a downstream effector of Cdc42 in cytoskeletal reorganization.
