= STAC3 =

Protein-coding gene in the species Homo sapiens

Identifiers
- Aliases: STAC3, NAM, SH3 and cysteine rich domain 3, MYPBB
- External IDs: OMIM: 615521; MGI: 3606571; GeneCards: STAC3
Available structures
PDB	Ortholog search: PDBe RCSB
PDB	List of PDB id codes 2DB6

Gene location (Human)
Chr.	Chromosome 12 (human)
Band	12q13.3	Start	57,243,453 bp
Band	12q13.3	End	57,251,188 bp

Gene location (Mouse)
Chr.	Chromosome 10 (mouse)
Band	10|10 D3	Start	127,337,555 bp
Band	10|10 D3	End	127,344,692 bp
RNA expression pattern
Bgee	Human / Mouse (ortholog); Top expressed in: gastrocnemius muscle; muscle of thigh; Skeletal muscle tissue of rectus abdominis; vastus lateralis muscle; Skeletal muscle tissue of biceps brachii; tibialis anterior muscle; body of tongue; deltoid muscle; monocyte; granulocyte / Top expressed in: muscle of thigh; triceps brachii muscle; vastus lateralis muscle; sternocleidomastoid muscle; temporal muscle; knee joint; medial head of gastrocnemius muscle; tibialis anterior muscle; digastric muscle; soleus muscle; More reference expression data
BioGPS	n/a
Gene ontology
Molecular function	protein binding; metal ion binding; identical protein binding
Cellular component	nucleoplasm; cytosol; voltage-gated calcium channel complex; extrinsic component of cytoplasmic side of plasma membrane; cytoplasm; plasma membrane; membrane; sarcolemma; T-tubule
Biological process	skeletal muscle contraction; neuromuscular synaptic transmission; intracellular signal transduction; skeletal muscle fiber development; positive regulation of voltage-gated calcium channel activity; positive regulation of protein localization to plasma membrane
Sources:Amigo / QuickGO
Orthologs
Databases	NCBI: entry; OMA: entry
Species	Human	Mouse
Entrez	246329	237611
Ensembl	ENSG00000185482	ENSMUSG00000040287
UniProt	Q96MF2	Q8BZ71
RefSeq (mRNA)	NM_001286256; NM_001286257; NM_145064	NM_177707; NM_001359751
RefSeq (protein)	NP_001273185; NP_001273186; NP_659501; NP_659501.1	NP_808375; NP_001346680
Location (UCSC)	Chr 12: 57.24 – 57.25 Mb	Chr 10: 127.34 – 127.34 Mb
PubMed search
- Wikidata
View/Edit Human	View/Edit Mouse

SH3 and cysteine-rich domain-containing protein 3 is a protein that in humans is encoded by the STAC3 gene.

STAC3 has been shown to be associated with the a special form of myopathy known as Native American myopathy (NAM), a neuromuscular disorder characterized by weakness, arthrogryposis, kyphoscoliosis, short stature, cleft palate, ptosis and susceptibility to malignant hyperthermia during anesthesia. It was first identified through a genetic screen in zebrafish and was shown to be a component of the excitation contraction coupling machinery, followed by it being mapped to the region of the human genome which had been shown to be associated with the defects observed in NAM.
