= HMHA1 =

Protein found in humans

ARHGAP45

Identifiers
- Aliases: ARHGAP45, HA-1, HLA-HA1, HMHA1, histocompatibility (minor) HA-1, Rho GTPase activating protein 45
- External IDs: OMIM: 601155; MGI: 1917969; GeneCards: ARHGAP45
Available structures
PDB	Ortholog search: PDBe RCSB
PDB	List of PDB id codes 3D25, 3FT3

Gene location (Human)
Chr.	Chromosome 19 (human)
Band	19p13.3	Start	1,065,923 bp
Band	19p13.3	End	1,086,628 bp

Gene location (Mouse)
Chr.	Chromosome 10 (mouse)
Band	10|10 C1	Start	79,852,487 bp
Band	10|10 C1	End	79,867,306 bp
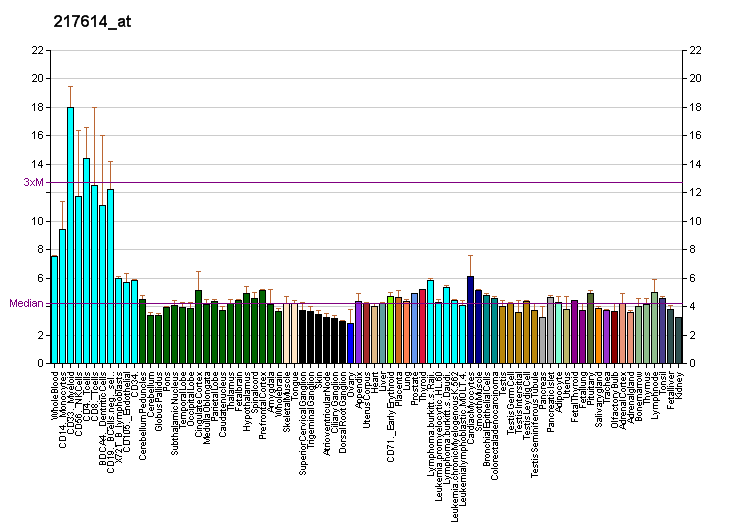

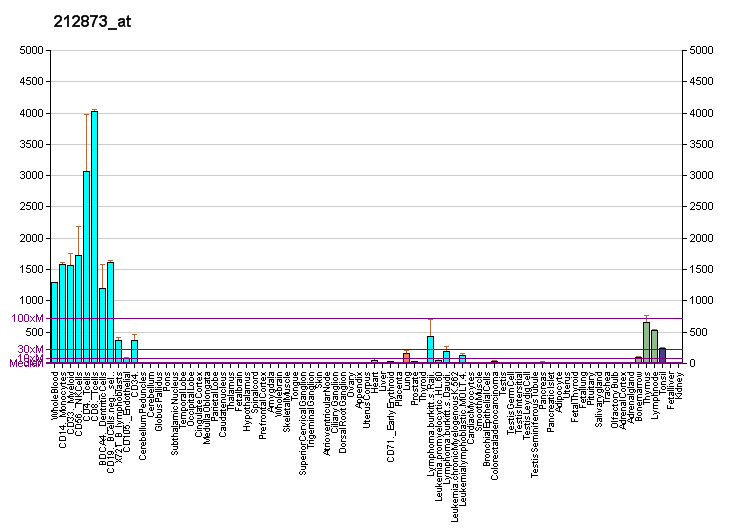
RNA expression pattern
Bgee	Human / Mouse (ortholog); Top expressed in: granulocyte; blood; spleen; oocyte; secondary oocyte; monocyte; lymph node; thymus; appendix; bone marrow cell / Top expressed in: granulocyte; thymus; mesenteric lymph nodes; blood; spleen; tibiofemoral joint; bone marrow; stroma of bone marrow; subcutaneous adipose tissue; ankle joint; More reference expression data
BioGPS	More reference expression data
Gene ontology
Molecular function	protein binding; metal ion binding; GTPase activator activity
Cellular component	cytosol; extracellular region; secretory granule lumen; azurophil granule lumen; cytoplasm; plasma membrane; membrane; ruffle membrane; cell projection
Biological process	positive regulation of GTPase activity; intracellular signal transduction; regulation of small GTPase mediated signal transduction; signal transduction; neutrophil degranulation
Sources:Amigo / QuickGO
Orthologs
Databases	NCBI: entry; OMA: entry
Species	Human	Mouse
Entrez	23526	70719
Ensembl	ENSG00000180448	ENSMUSG00000035697
UniProt	Q92619	Q3TBD2
RefSeq (mRNA)	NM_001258328; NM_001282334; NM_001282335; NM_012292; NM_001321232	NM_001142701; NM_027521; NM_001347074
RefSeq (protein)	NP_001245257; NP_001269263; NP_001269264; NP_001308161; NP_036424	NP_001136173; NP_001334003; NP_081797
Location (UCSC)	Chr 19: 1.07 – 1.09 Mb	Chr 10: 79.85 – 79.87 Mb
PubMed search
- Wikidata
View/Edit Human	View/Edit Mouse

Minor histocompatibility protein HA-1 (or HMHA1) is a protein that in humans is encoded by the ARHGAP45 gene. More specifically, the protein encoded by ARHGAP45 is cleaved to form the histocompatibility antigen called HA-1.
