= PLCE1 =

Protein-coding gene in the species Homo sapiens

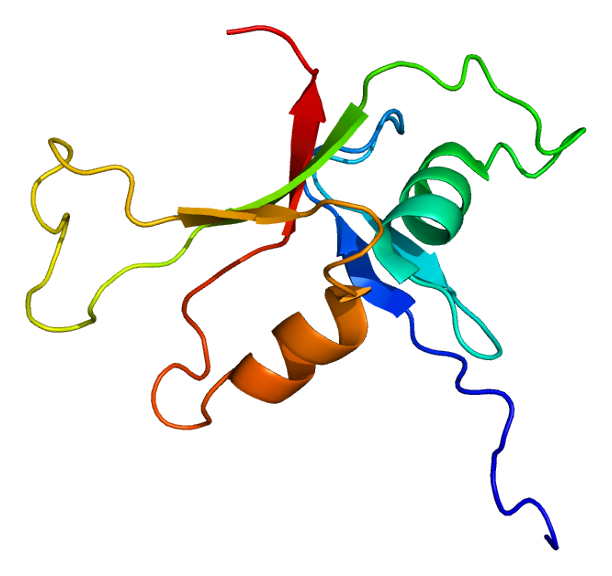

Identifiers
- Aliases: PLCE1, NPHS3, PLCE, PPLC, phospholipase C epsilon 1
- External IDs: OMIM: 608414; MGI: 1921305; GeneCards: PLCE1
Available structures
PDB	Ortholog search: PDBe RCSB
PDB	List of PDB id codes 2BYE, 2BYF, 2C5L
Enzyme activity
EC #	BRENDA	ExPASy	KEGG	MetaCyc
3.1.4.11	↗	↗	↗	↗

Gene location (Human)
Chr.	Chromosome 10 (human)
Band	10q23.33	Start	93,993,931 bp
Band	10q23.33	End	94,332,823 bp

Gene location (Mouse)
Chr.	Chromosome 19 (mouse)
Band	19|19 C3	Start	38,469,557 bp
Band	19|19 C3	End	38,773,474 bp
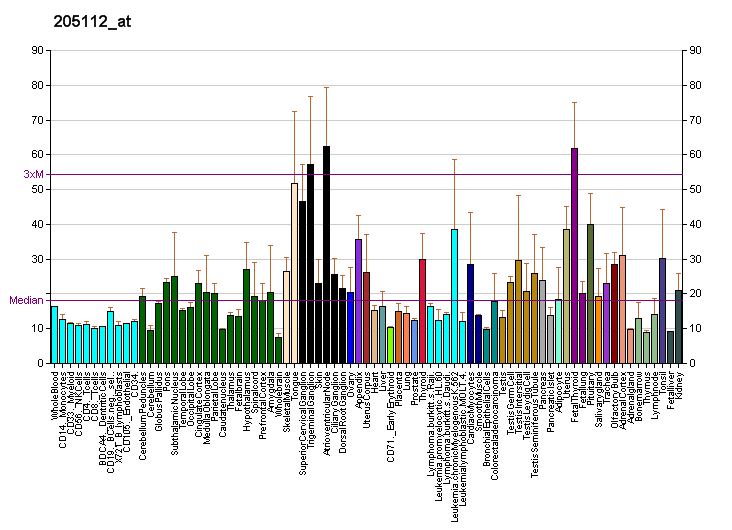

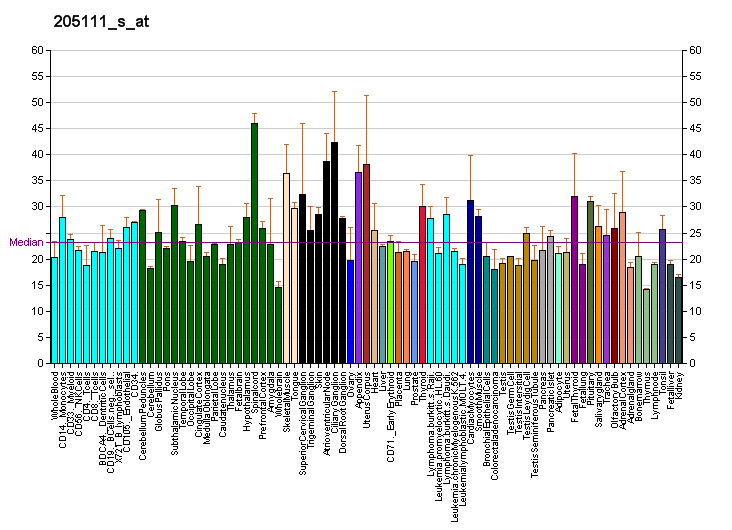
RNA expression pattern
Bgee	Human / Mouse (ortholog); Top expressed in: glomerulus; metanephric glomerulus; ventricular zone; retinal pigment epithelium; mucosa of colon; ganglionic eminence; mucosa of sigmoid colon; tibial arteries; islet of Langerhans; parotid gland / Top expressed in: retinal pigment epithelium; vestibular membrane of cochlear duct; transitional epithelium of urinary bladder; primary oocyte; sciatic nerve; trigeminal ganglion; stria vascularis; Epithelium of choroid plexus; vestibular sensory epithelium; zygote; More reference expression data
BioGPS	More reference expression data
Gene ontology
Molecular function	guanyl-nucleotide exchange factor activity; signal transducer activity; protein binding; phosphoric diester hydrolase activity; enzyme binding; phospholipase C activity; hydrolase activity; phosphatidylinositol phospholipase C activity; metal ion binding
Cellular component	cytosol; Golgi apparatus; membrane; Golgi membrane; plasma membrane; cytoplasm
Biological process	intracellular signal transduction; epidermal growth factor receptor signaling pathway; regulation of G protein-coupled receptor signaling pathway; regulation of smooth muscle contraction; lipid metabolism; positive regulation of cytosolic calcium ion concentration; small GTPase mediated signal transduction; regulation of Ras protein signal transduction; glomerulus development; inositol phosphate metabolic process; diacylglycerol biosynthetic process; lipid catabolic process; phospholipase C-activating G protein-coupled receptor signaling pathway; development of the heart; cytoskeleton organization; regulation of cell growth; regulation of protein kinase activity; cell population proliferation; inositol phosphate-mediated signaling; calcium-mediated signaling; signal transduction; Ras protein signal transduction; inositol trisphosphate biosynthetic process; phosphatidylinositol-mediated signaling; release of sequestered calcium ion into cytosol
Sources:Amigo / QuickGO
Orthologs
Databases	NCBI: entry; OMA: entry
Species	Human	Mouse
Entrez	51196	74055
Ensembl	ENSG00000138193	ENSMUSG00000024998
UniProt	Q9P212	Q8K4S1
RefSeq (mRNA)	NM_001165979; NM_001288989; NM_016341	NM_019588
RefSeq (protein)	NP_001159451; NP_001275918; NP_057425	NP_062534
Location (UCSC)	Chr 10: 93.99 – 94.33 Mb	Chr 19: 38.47 – 38.77 Mb
PubMed search
- Wikidata
View/Edit Human	View/Edit Mouse

Phospholipase C epsilon 1 (PLCE1) is an enzyme that in humans is encoded by the PLCE1 gene. This gene encodes a phospholipase enzyme (PLCE1) that catalyzes the hydrolysis of phosphatidylinositol-4,5-bisphosphate to generate two second messengers: inositol 1,4,5-triphosphate (IP3) and diacylglycerol (DAG). Mutations in this gene cause early-onset nephrotic syndrome and have been associated with respiratory chain deficiency with diffuse mesangial sclerosis.

== Structure ==
PLCE1 is located on the q arm of chromosome 10 in position 23.33 and has 39 exons. PLCE1, the protein encoded by this gene, is located on the Golgi apparatus, the cell membrane, and in the cytosol. It contains 3 turns, 15 beta strands, and 6 alpha helixes. PLCE1 contains a 260 amino acid Ras-GEF domain at p. 531-790, a 149 amino acid PI-PLC X-box domain at p. 1392-1540, a 117 amino acid PI-PLC Y-box domain at p. 1730 – 1846, a 101 amino acid C2 domain at p. 1856 – 1956, a 103 amino acid Ras-associating 1 domain at p. 2012 – 2114, and a 104 amino acid Ras-associating 2 domain at p. 2135 – 2238. There is a region of 79 amino acids from p. 1686 – 1764 that is required for PLCE1 to be activated by RHOA, RHOB, GNA12, GNA13 and G-beta gamma. PLCE1 also has a Ca2+ cofactor. Alternative splicing results in multiple transcript variants encoding distinct isoforms.

== Function ==
PLCE1 belongs to the phospholipase family that catalyzes the hydrolysis of polyphosphoinositides such as phosphatidylinositol-4,5-bisphosphate (PtdIns(4,5)P2) to generate the second messengers Ins(1,4,5)P3 and diacylglycerol. These products initiate a cascade of intracellular responses that result in cell growth and differentiation and gene expression.[supplied by OMIM]

=== Catalytic activity ===
1-phosphatidyl-1D-myo-inositol 4,5-bisphosphate + H_{2}O = 1D-myo-inositol 1,4,5-trisphosphate + diacylglycerol.

== Clinical significance ==
Mutations in this gene cause early-onset nephrotic syndrome. This disease is characterized by proteinuria, edema, and diffuse mesangial sclerosis or focal and segmental glomerulosclerosis. Signs and symptoms include kidney biopsies demonstrating non-specific histologic changes such as focal segmental glomerulosclerosis and diffuse mesangial proliferation as well as genetic tests revealing a pathogenic S1484L mutation. Diffuse mesangial proliferation is characterized by mesangial matrix expansion with no mesangial hypercellularity, hypertrophy of the podocytes, vacuolized podocytes, thickened basement membranes, and diminished patency of the capillary lumen. This disease has also been associated with mitochondrial cytopathy stemming from respiratory chain deficiency primarily affecting complex IV.

Additionally, Phospholipase C epsilon modulates beta-adrenergic receptor-dependent cardiac contraction and it has been found that this protein is over expressed during heart failure. Research has suggested that PLCE1 may thus inhibit cardiac hypertrophy.

PLCE1 gene polymorphism increases susceptibility to oesophageal, gastric, colon, and squamous cell carcinoma of the head and neck area. It is shown that PLCE1 is highly expressed in osteosarcoma and regulates its proliferation and invasion. PLCE1 also affects the survival of patients with osteosarcoma. Therefore, it is suggested as a potential diagnostic biomarker and molecular therapeutic target for osteosarcoma.

== Interactions ==
PLCE1 has been shown to have 12 binary protein-protein interactions including 8 co-complex interactions. PLCE1 appears to interact with RyR2, HRAS, NRAS, and LIMS1.
