= PRKCD =

Protein-coding gene in the species Homo sapiens

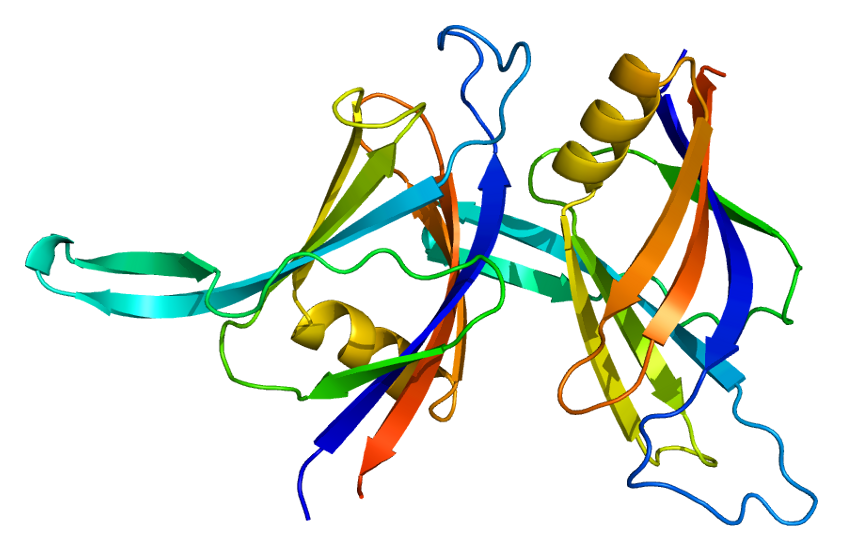

Identifiers
- Aliases: PRKCD, ALPS3, CVID9, MAY1, PKCD, nPKC-delta, protein kinase C delta
- External IDs: OMIM: 176977; MGI: 97598; GeneCards: PRKCD
Available structures
PDB	Ortholog search: PDBe RCSB
PDB	List of PDB id codes 2YUU, 1YRK
Enzyme activity
EC #	BRENDA	ExPASy	KEGG	MetaCyc
2.7.10.2	↗	↗	↗	↗
2.7.11.13	↗	↗	↗	↗

Gene location (Human)
Chr.	Chromosome 3 (human)
Band	3p21.1	Start	53,156,009 bp
Band	3p21.1	End	53,192,717 bp

Gene location (Mouse)
Chr.	Chromosome 14 (mouse)
Band	14 B|14 18.82 cM	Start	30,317,311 bp
Band	14 B|14 18.82 cM	End	30,348,167 bp
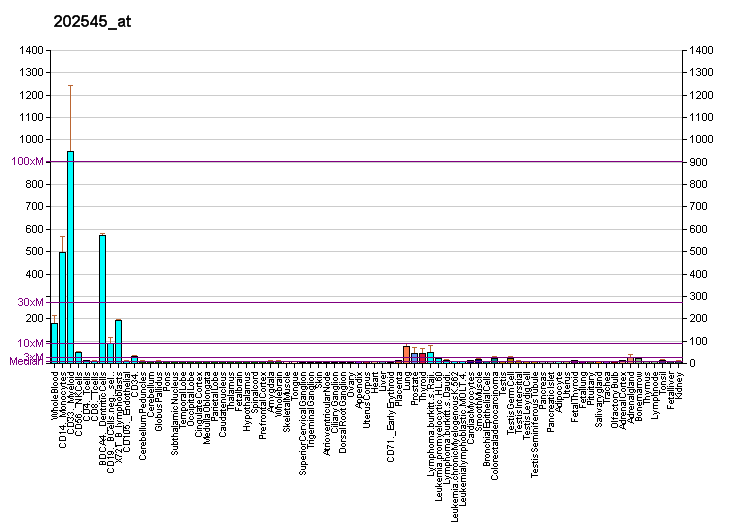
RNA expression pattern
Bgee	Human / Mouse (ortholog); Top expressed in: monocyte; granulocyte; right adrenal cortex; right uterine tube; mucosa of transverse colon; left adrenal gland; left adrenal cortex; right lobe of thyroid gland; left lobe of thyroid gland; rectum / Top expressed in: lateral geniculate nucleus; granulocyte; medial dorsal nucleus; medial geniculate nucleus; lateral septal nucleus; pyloric antrum; seminiferous tubule; epithelium of stomach; large intestine; colon; More reference expression data
BioGPS	More reference expression data
Gene ontology
Molecular function	kinase activity; ATP binding; protein kinase activity; non-membrane spanning protein tyrosine kinase activity; metal ion binding; kinase binding; enzyme binding; insulin receptor substrate binding; transferase activity; protein binding; calcium-independent protein kinase C activity; protein kinase binding; nucleotide binding; enzyme activator activity; protein serine/threonine kinase activity; protein kinase C activity
Cellular component	cytoplasm; cytosol; membrane; cell-cell junction; perinuclear region of cytoplasm; nucleus; nuclear matrix; endoplasmic reticulum; extracellular exosome; plasma membrane; nucleoplasm; extracellular region; azurophil granule lumen
Biological process	intrinsic apoptotic signaling pathway in response to oxidative stress; termination of signal transduction; interferon-gamma-mediated signaling pathway; negative regulation of protein binding; positive regulation of endodeoxyribonuclease activity; platelet activation; protein phosphorylation; cellular senescence; negative regulation of insulin receptor signaling pathway; positive regulation of sphingomyelin catabolic process; cell chemotaxis; cell cycle; negative regulation of inflammatory response; positive regulation of protein dephosphorylation; Fc-gamma receptor signaling pathway involved in phagocytosis; positive regulation of apoptotic signaling pathway; stimulatory C-type lectin receptor signaling pathway; cellular response to hydroperoxide; negative regulation of peptidyl-tyrosine phosphorylation; defense response to bacterium; negative regulation of MAP kinase activity; positive regulation of response to DNA damage stimulus; positive regulation of protein import into nucleus; interleukin-10 production; regulation of actin cytoskeleton organization; negative regulation of actin filament polymerization; regulation of mRNA stability; phosphorylation; protein stabilization; regulation of signaling receptor activity; negative regulation of filopodium assembly; cellular response to angiotensin; interleukin-12 production; peptidyl-threonine phosphorylation; positive regulation of ceramide biosynthetic process; neutrophil activation; intracellular signal transduction; negative regulation of glial cell apoptotic process; negative regulation of platelet aggregation; positive regulation of phospholipid scramblase activity; B cell proliferation; immunoglobulin mediated immune response; positive regulation of glucosylceramide catabolic process; peptidyl-tyrosine phosphorylation; positive regulation of superoxide anion generation; activation of protein kinase activity; signal transduction; cellular response to hydrogen peroxide; peptidyl-serine phosphorylation; apoptotic process; neutrophil degranulation; execution phase of apoptosis
Sources:Amigo / QuickGO
Orthologs
Databases	NCBI: entry; OMA: entry
Species	Human	Mouse
Entrez	5580	18753
Ensembl	ENSG00000163932	ENSMUSG00000021948
UniProt	Q05655	P28867
RefSeq (mRNA)	NM_006254; NM_212539; NM_001316327; NM_001354676; NM_001354678 NM_001354679; NM_001354680	NM_011103; NM_001310682
RefSeq (protein)	NP_001303256; NP_006245; NP_997704; NP_001341605; NP_001341607 NP_001341608; NP_001341609	NP_001297611; NP_035233
Location (UCSC)	Chr 3: 53.16 – 53.19 Mb	Chr 14: 30.32 – 30.35 Mb
PubMed search
- Wikidata
View/Edit Human	View/Edit Mouse

Protein kinase C delta type (or PKC-δ) is an enzyme that in humans is encoded by the PRKCD gene.

== Function ==
Protein kinase C (PKC) is a family of serine- and threonine-specific protein kinases that can be activated by the second messenger diacylglycerol. PKC family members phosphorylate a wide variety of protein targets and are known to be involved in diverse cellular signaling pathways. PKC family members also serve as major receptors for phorbol esters, a class of tumor promoters. Each member of the PKC family has a specific expression profile and is believed to play distinct roles in cells. The protein encoded by this gene is one of the PKC family members. Studies both in human and mice demonstrate that this kinase is involved in B cell signaling and in the regulation of growth, apoptosis, and differentiation of a variety of cell types. Protein kinase C delta is also regulated by phosphorylation on various serine/threonine (e.g. T50, T141, S304, T451, T505, S506, T507, S643, S664) and tyrosine residues including Y311 (by SRC).

== Interactions ==
PRKCD has been shown to interact with:

- C1QBP,
- HER2/neu,
- INSR,
- MUC1,
- mTOR,
- PLD2,
- PTPN6,
- PTPRM,
- PDPK1,
- RASGRP3,
- SHC1 and
- STAT1.
