= DGKD =

Protein-coding gene in the species Homo sapiens

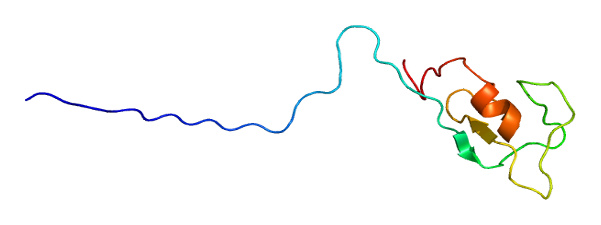

Identifiers
- Aliases: DGKD, DGKdelta, dgkd-2, diacylglycerol kinase delta, DGK-delta
- External IDs: OMIM: 601826; MGI: 2138334; GeneCards: DGKD
Available structures
PDB	Ortholog search: PDBe RCSB
PDB	List of PDB id codes 1R79, 3BQ7
Enzyme activity
EC #	BRENDA	ExPASy	KEGG	MetaCyc
2.7.1.107	↗	↗	↗	↗

Gene location (Human)
Chr.	Chromosome 2 (human)
Band	2q37.1	Start	233,354,494 bp
Band	2q37.1	End	233,472,104 bp

Gene location (Mouse)
Chr.	Chromosome 1 (mouse)
Band	1|1 D	Start	87,781,009 bp
Band	1|1 D	End	87,872,902 bp
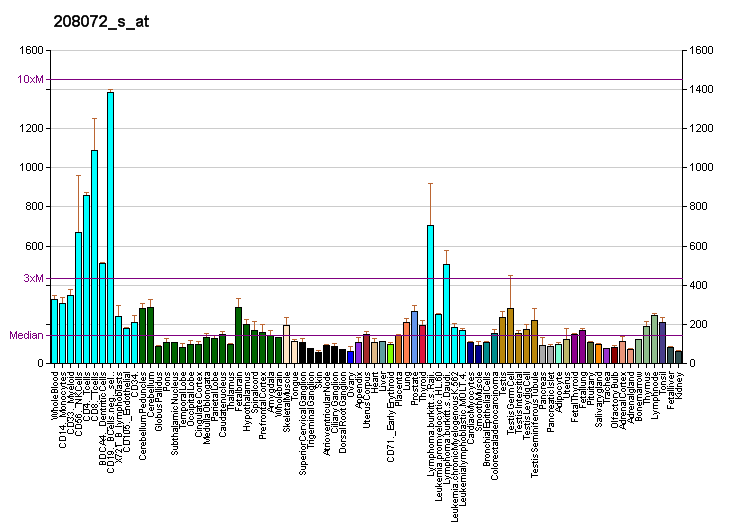
RNA expression pattern
Bgee	Human / Mouse (ortholog); Top expressed in: body of stomach; cerebellar hemisphere; right hemisphere of cerebellum; granulocyte; gastrocnemius muscle; bone marrow; skeletal muscle tissue; blood; fundus; bone marrow cell / Top expressed in: spermatocyte; thymus; spermatid; granulocyte; brown adipose tissue; neural layer of retina; subcutaneous adipose tissue; mesenteric lymph nodes; cerebellum; lobe of cerebellum; More reference expression data
BioGPS	More reference expression data
Gene ontology
Molecular function	transferase activity; nucleotide binding; diacylglycerol kinase activity; metal ion binding; kinase activity; protein binding; diacylglycerol binding; ATP binding; NAD+ kinase activity; identical protein binding; protein homodimerization activity; protein heterodimerization activity
Cellular component	cytoplasm; membrane; plasma membrane; nucleus; cytosol; cytoplasmic vesicle
Biological process	intracellular signal transduction; endocytosis; epidermal growth factor receptor signaling pathway; phosphorylation; response to organic substance; platelet activation; multicellular organism development; cell growth; protein kinase C-activating G protein-coupled receptor signaling pathway; diacylglycerol metabolic process; protein transport; second-messenger-mediated signaling; protein homooligomerization; lipid phosphorylation; metabolism; signal transduction; glycerolipid metabolic process
Sources:Amigo / QuickGO
Orthologs
Databases	NCBI: entry; OMA: entry
Species	Human	Mouse
Entrez	8527	227333
Ensembl	ENSG00000077044; ENSG00000280873	ENSMUSG00000070738
UniProt	Q16760	E9PUQ8
RefSeq (mRNA)	NM_003648; NM_152879; NM_001377259	NM_177646
RefSeq (protein)	NP_003639; NP_690618; NP_001364188	NP_808314
Location (UCSC)	Chr 2: 233.35 – 233.47 Mb	Chr 1: 87.78 – 87.87 Mb
PubMed search
- Wikidata
View/Edit Human	View/Edit Mouse

Diacylglycerol kinase delta is an enzyme that in humans is encoded by the DGKD gene.

This gene encodes a cytoplasmic enzyme that phosphorylates diacylglycerol to produce phosphatidic acid. Diacylglycerol and phosphatidic acid are two lipids that act as second messengers in signaling cascades. Their cellular concentrations are regulated by the encoded protein, and so it is thought to play an important role in cellular signal transduction. Alternative splicing results in two transcript variants encoding different isoforms.
