= PRKCH =

Protein-coding gene in the species Homo sapiens

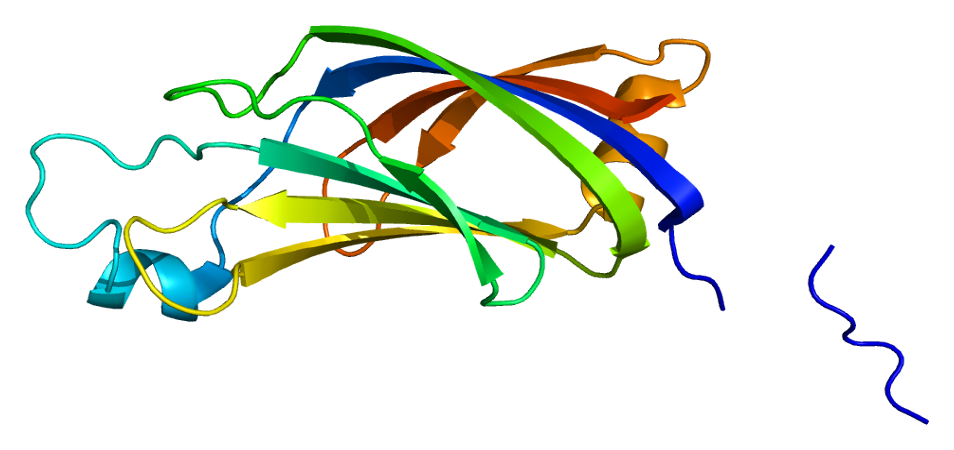

Identifiers
- Aliases: PRKCH, PKC-L, PKCL, PRKCL, nPKC-eta, protein kinase C eta
- External IDs: OMIM: 605437; MGI: 97600; GeneCards: PRKCH
Available structures
PDB	Ortholog search: PDBe RCSB
PDB	List of PDB id codes 2FK9, 3TXO
Enzyme activity
EC #	BRENDA	ExPASy	KEGG	MetaCyc
2.7.11.13	↗	↗	↗	↗

Gene location (Human)
Chr.	Chromosome 14 (human)
Band	14q23.1	Start	61,187,559 bp
Band	14q23.1	End	61,550,976 bp

Gene location (Mouse)
Chr.	Chromosome 12 (mouse)
Band	12|12 C3	Start	73,631,570 bp
Band	12|12 C3	End	73,824,959 bp
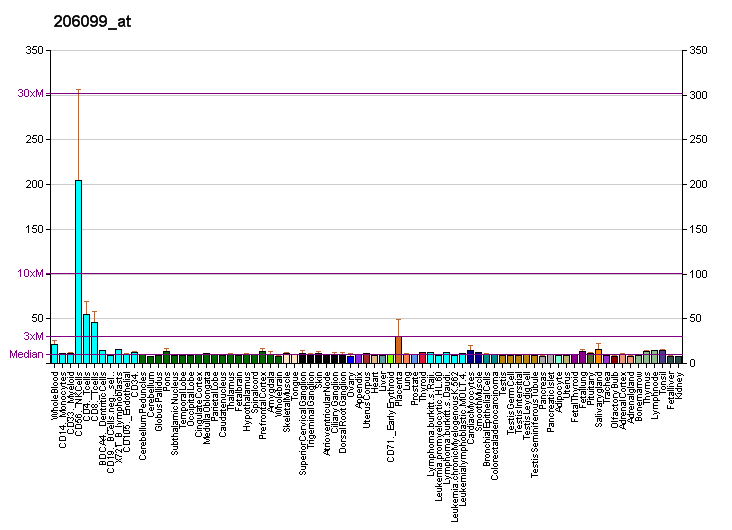

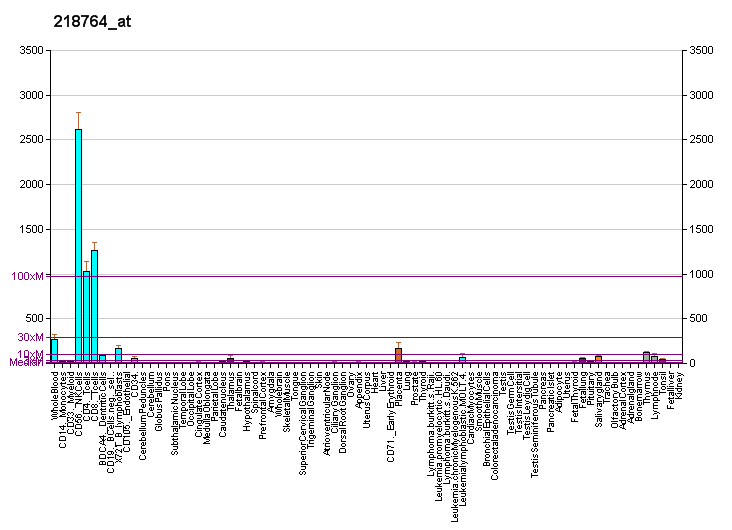
RNA expression pattern
Bgee	Human / Mouse (ortholog); Top expressed in: parotid gland; granulocyte; blood; lymph node; tonsil; upper lobe of left lung; thymus; right lung; visceral pleura; epithelium of colon / Top expressed in: right lung lobe; esophagus; hair follicle; gastrula; endothelial cell of lymphatic vessel; transitional epithelium of urinary bladder; blood; thymus; lip; nucleus accumbens; More reference expression data
BioGPS	More reference expression data
Gene ontology
Molecular function	transferase activity; nucleotide binding; protein kinase activity; protein kinase C activity; metal ion binding; kinase activity; protein serine/threonine kinase activity; calcium-independent protein kinase C activity; enzyme binding; ATP binding; protein binding
Cellular component	cytoplasm; cytosol; membrane; cell-cell junction; plasma membrane; extracellular exosome; intracellular anatomical structure
Biological process	positive regulation of B cell receptor signaling pathway; cell differentiation; intracellular signal transduction; phosphorylation; regulation of bicellular tight junction assembly; positive regulation of keratinocyte differentiation; negative regulation of glial cell apoptotic process; protein kinase C signaling; platelet activation; protein phosphorylation; positive regulation of macrophage derived foam cell differentiation; positive regulation of NF-kappaB transcription factor activity; peptidyl-serine phosphorylation; positive regulation of glial cell proliferation; signal transduction; positive regulation of protein localization to plasma membrane
Sources:Amigo / QuickGO
Orthologs
Databases	NCBI: entry; OMA: entry
Species	Human	Mouse
Entrez	5583	18755
Ensembl	ENSG00000027075	ENSMUSG00000021108
UniProt	P24723	P23298
RefSeq (mRNA)	NM_006255	NM_008856; NM_001313977
RefSeq (protein)	NP_006246	NP_001300906; NP_032882
Location (UCSC)	Chr 14: 61.19 – 61.55 Mb	Chr 12: 73.63 – 73.82 Mb
PubMed search
- Wikidata
View/Edit Human	View/Edit Mouse

Protein kinase C eta type is an enzyme that in humans is encoded by the PRKCH gene.

Protein kinase C (PKC) is a family of serine- and threonine-specific protein kinases that can be activated by calcium and the second messenger diacylglycerol. PKC family members phosphorylate a wide variety of protein targets and are known to be involved in diverse cellular signaling pathways. PKC family members also serve as major receptors for phorbol esters, a class of tumor promoters. Each member of the PKC family has a specific expression profile and is believed to play a distinct role in cells. The protein encoded by this gene is one of the PKC family members. It is a calcium-independent and phospholipids-dependent protein kinase. It is predominantly expressed in epithelial tissues and has been shown to reside specifically in the cell nucleus. This protein kinase can regulate keratinocyte differentiation by activating the MAP kinase MAPK13 (p38delta)-activated protein kinase cascade that targets CCAAT/enhancer-binding protein alpha (CEBPA). It is also found to mediate the transcription activation of the transglutaminase 1 (TGM1) gene.
