= Unc-13 homolog C =

Protein-coding gene in the species Homo sapiens

UNC13C

Identifiers
- Aliases: UNC13C, unc-13 homolog C
- External IDs: OMIM: 614568; MGI: 2149021; GeneCards: UNC13C

Gene location (Human)
Chr.	Chromosome 15 (human)
Band	15q21.3	Start	53,978,201 bp
Band	15q21.3	End	54,628,707 bp

Gene location (Mouse)
Chr.	Chromosome 9 (mouse)
Band	9 D|9 40.8 cM	Start	73,386,704 bp
Band	9 D|9 40.8 cM	End	73,876,248 bp
RNA expression pattern
Bgee	Human / Mouse (ortholog); Top expressed in: secondary oocyte; endothelial cell; pars reticulata; pars compacta; cerebellar vermis; pons; primary visual cortex; cerebellar hemisphere; Brodmann area 23; right hemisphere of cerebellum / Top expressed in: globus pallidus; pontine nuclei; lateral geniculate nucleus; lobe of cerebellum; cerebellar vermis; superior colliculus; nucleus accumbens; dorsal striatum; primary oocyte; ventral tegmental area; More reference expression data
BioGPS	n/a
Gene ontology
Molecular function	diacylglycerol binding; metal ion binding; calcium ion binding; phospholipid binding; calmodulin binding; syntaxin-1 binding
Cellular component	cytoplasm; presynaptic active zone; cell junction; plasma membrane; synapse; presynaptic membrane; membrane; terminal bouton; calyx of Held; presynapse; parallel fiber to Purkinje cell synapse; synaptic vesicle membrane; neuromuscular junction; presynaptic active zone cytoplasmic component
Biological process	intracellular signal transduction; exocytosis; chemical synaptic transmission; synaptic vesicle exocytosis; negative regulation of synaptic plasticity; neuromuscular junction development; synaptic vesicle docking; synaptic vesicle priming; synaptic vesicle maturation; synaptic transmission, glutamatergic; dense core granule priming; presynaptic dense core vesicle exocytosis
Sources:Amigo / QuickGO
Orthologs
Databases	NCBI: entry; OMA: entry
Species	Human	Mouse
Entrez	440279	208898
Ensembl	ENSG00000137766	ENSMUSG00000062151
UniProt	Q8NB66	Q8K0T7
RefSeq (mRNA)	NM_001080534; NM_001329919	NM_001081153; NM_153531
RefSeq (protein)	NP_001074003; NP_001316848	NP_001074622
Location (UCSC)	Chr 15: 53.98 – 54.63 Mb	Chr 9: 73.39 – 73.88 Mb
PubMed search
- Wikidata
View/Edit Human	View/Edit Mouse

Unc-13 homolog C (C. elegans) is a protein that, in humans, is encoded by the UNC13C gene.
