= RASGRF2 =

Protein-coding gene in the species Homo sapiens

Identifiers
- Aliases: RASGRF2, GRF2, RAS-GRF2, Ras protein specific guanine nucleotide releasing factor 2
- External IDs: OMIM: 606614; MGI: 109137; GeneCards: RASGRF2

Gene location (Human)
Chr.	Chromosome 5 (human)
Band	5q14.1	Start	80,960,363 bp
Band	5q14.1	End	81,230,162 bp

Gene location (Mouse)
Chr.	Chromosome 13 (mouse)
Band	13 C3|13 47.43 cM	Start	92,028,519 bp
Band	13 C3|13 47.43 cM	End	92,268,164 bp
RNA expression pattern
Bgee	Human / Mouse (ortholog); Top expressed in: middle temporal gyrus; Brodmann area 23; endothelial cell; sural nerve; Brodmann area 46; prefrontal cortex; corpus callosum; superior frontal gyrus; C1 segment; occipital lobe / Top expressed in: ventromedial nucleus; olfactory tubercle; neural layer of retina; arcuate nucleus; paraventricular nucleus of hypothalamus; dorsomedial hypothalamic nucleus; substantia nigra; superior frontal gyrus; dentate gyrus of hippocampal formation granule cell; ventral tegmental area; More reference expression data
BioGPS	n/a
Gene ontology
Molecular function	calmodulin binding; guanyl-nucleotide exchange factor activity
Cellular component	cytoplasm; cytosol; endoplasmic reticulum membrane; membrane; plasma membrane; endoplasmic reticulum
Biological process	regulation of Ras protein signal transduction; MAPK cascade; positive regulation of apoptotic process; regulation of Rho protein signal transduction; regulation of small GTPase mediated signal transduction; small GTPase mediated signal transduction; response to endoplasmic reticulum stress; G protein-coupled receptor signaling pathway
Sources:Amigo / QuickGO
Orthologs
Databases	NCBI: entry; OMA: entry
Species	Human	Mouse
Entrez	5924	19418
Ensembl	ENSG00000113319	ENSMUSG00000021708
UniProt	O14827	P70392
RefSeq (mRNA)	NM_006909	NM_009027
RefSeq (protein)	NP_008840	NP_033053
Location (UCSC)	Chr 5: 80.96 – 81.23 Mb	Chr 13: 92.03 – 92.27 Mb
PubMed search
- Wikidata
View/Edit Human	View/Edit Mouse

Ras-specific guanine nucleotide-releasing factor 2 is a protein that in humans is encoded by the RASGRF2 gene.

RAS (MIM 190020) GTPases cycle between an inactive GDP-bound state and an active GTP-bound state. Guanine-nucleotide exchange factors (GEFs), such as RASGRFs, stimulate the conversion of the GDP-bound form into the active form.[supplied by OMIM]

Variations in this gene has been shown to be linked to the propensity to binge drink by teenagers.
