= MYO9B =

Protein-coding gene in the species Homo sapiens

Identifiers
- Aliases: MYO9B, CELIAC4, MYR5, myosin IXB
- External IDs: OMIM: 602129; MGI: 106624; GeneCards: MYO9B
Available structures
PDB	Ortholog search: PDBe RCSB
PDB	List of PDB id codes 5C5S, 5HPY

Gene location (Human)
Chr.	Chromosome 19 (human)
Band	19p13.11	Start	17,075,777 bp
Band	19p13.11	End	17,214,537 bp

Gene location (Mouse)
Chr.	Chromosome 8 (mouse)
Band	8 B3.3|8 34.43 cM	Start	71,725,358 bp
Band	8 B3.3|8 34.43 cM	End	71,813,357 bp
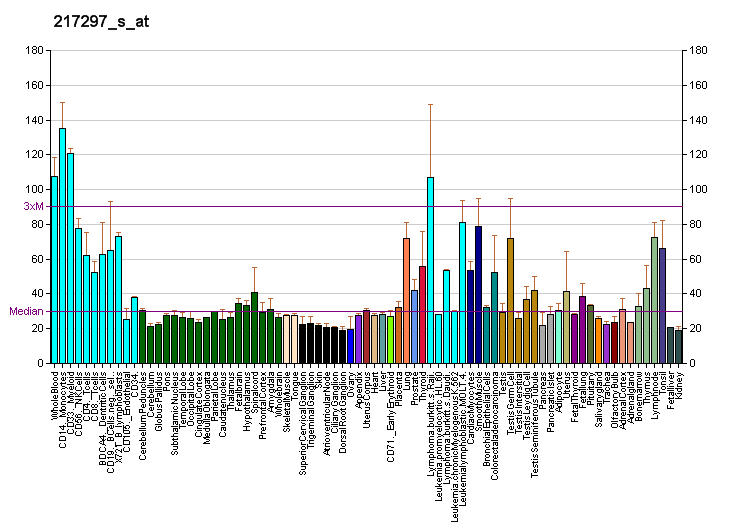

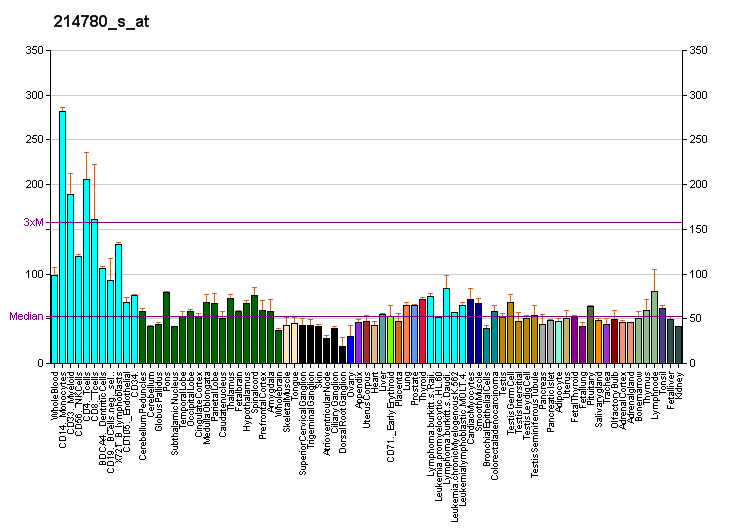
RNA expression pattern
Bgee	Human / Mouse (ortholog); Top expressed in: granulocyte; sural nerve; left testis; C1 segment; right testis; spleen; right hemisphere of cerebellum; ascending aorta; Descending thoracic aorta; upper lobe of left lung / Top expressed in: ascending aorta; granulocyte; gastrula; tunica media of zone of aorta; internal carotid artery; stroma of bone marrow; external carotid artery; aortic valve; calvaria; neural layer of retina; More reference expression data
BioGPS	More reference expression data
Gene ontology
Molecular function	nucleotide binding; protein homodimerization activity; metal ion binding; calmodulin binding; microfilament motor activity; protein binding; actin binding; cytoskeletal motor activity; ATP binding; Roundabout binding; ADP binding; GTPase activator activity; ATPase activity
Cellular component	cytoplasm; membrane; cell cortex; actin cytoskeleton; perinuclear region of cytoplasm; cytoskeleton; myosin complex; actin filament; cytosol
Biological process	intracellular signal transduction; ARF protein signal transduction; Roundabout signaling pathway; actin filament-based movement; positive regulation of GTPase activity; regulation of Rho protein signal transduction; regulation of small GTPase mediated signal transduction; signal transduction; Rho protein signal transduction
Sources:Amigo / QuickGO
Orthologs
Databases	NCBI: entry; OMA: entry
Species	Human	Mouse
Entrez	4650	17925
Ensembl	ENSG00000099331	ENSMUSG00000004677
UniProt	Q13459	Q9QY06
RefSeq (mRNA)	NM_001130065; NM_004145	NM_001142322; NM_001142323; NM_015742
RefSeq (protein)	NP_001123537; NP_004136	n/a
Location (UCSC)	Chr 19: 17.08 – 17.21 Mb	Chr 8: 71.73 – 71.81 Mb
PubMed search
- Wikidata
View/Edit Human	View/Edit Mouse

MYO9B is a gene that encodes the Myosin-IXb protein.
