= PRKD3 =

Protein-coding gene in the species Homo sapiens

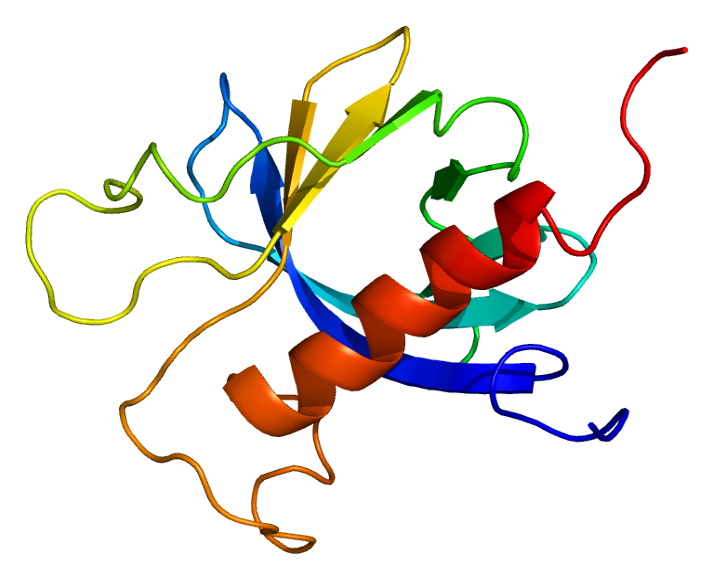

Identifiers
- Aliases: PRKD3, EPK2, PKC-NU, PKD3, PRKCN, nPKC-NU, protein kinase D3
- External IDs: OMIM: 607077; MGI: 1922542; GeneCards: PRKD3
Available structures
PDB	Ortholog search: PDBe RCSB
PDB	List of PDB id codes 2D9Z
Enzyme activity
EC #	BRENDA	ExPASy	KEGG	MetaCyc
2.7.11.13	↗	↗	↗	↗

Gene location (Human)
Chr.	Chromosome 2 (human)
Band	2p22.2	Start	37,250,502 bp
Band	2p22.2	End	37,324,833 bp

Gene location (Mouse)
Chr.	Chromosome 17 (mouse)
Band	17|17 E3	Start	79,256,834 bp
Band	17|17 E3	End	79,328,245 bp
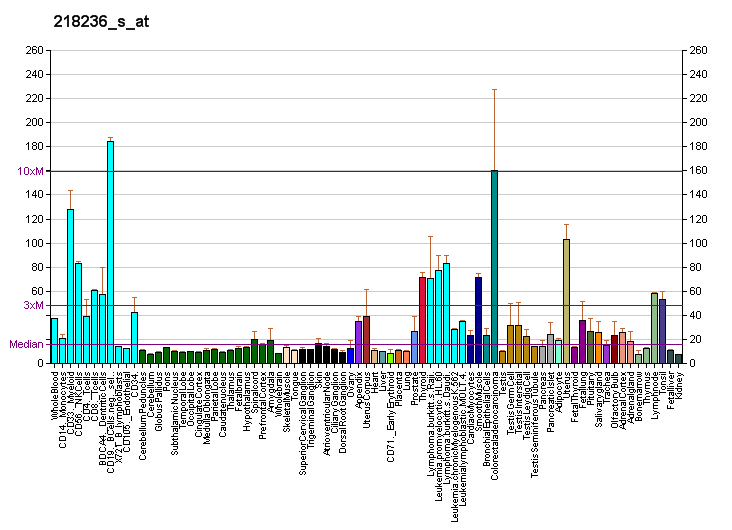

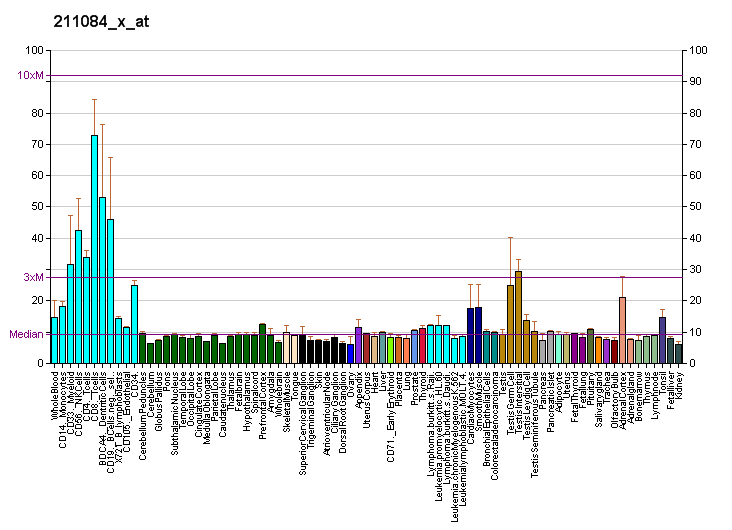
RNA expression pattern
Bgee	Human / Mouse (ortholog); Top expressed in: Achilles tendon; buccal mucosa cell; sperm; corpus epididymis; tail of epididymis; skin of hip; parietal pleura; tibia; cartilage tissue; superficial temporal artery / Top expressed in: Rostral migratory stream; internal carotid artery; saccule; external carotid artery; vas deferens; condyle; efferent ductule; fossa; otic placode; renal corpuscle; More reference expression data
BioGPS	More reference expression data
Gene ontology
Molecular function	transferase activity; nucleotide binding; protein kinase activity; protein kinase C activity; protein binding; ATP binding; metal ion binding; kinase activity; protein serine/threonine kinase activity
Cellular component	membrane; nucleoplasm; cytosol; cytoplasm
Biological process	protein phosphorylation; protein kinase C-activating G protein-coupled receptor signaling pathway; intracellular signal transduction; phosphorylation; sphingolipid biosynthetic process; protein kinase D signaling
Sources:Amigo / QuickGO
Orthologs
Databases	NCBI: entry; OMA: entry
Species	Human	Mouse
Entrez	23683	75292
Ensembl	ENSG00000115825	ENSMUSG00000024070
UniProt	O94806	Q8K1Y2
RefSeq (mRNA)	NM_005813	NM_001171004; NM_001171005; NM_029239
RefSeq (protein)	NP_005804	NP_001164475; NP_001164476; NP_083515
Location (UCSC)	Chr 2: 37.25 – 37.32 Mb	Chr 17: 79.26 – 79.33 Mb
PubMed search
- Wikidata
View/Edit Human	View/Edit Mouse

Serine/threonine-protein kinase D3 (PKD3) or PKC-nu is an enzyme that in humans is encoded by the PRKD3 gene.

Protein kinase C (PKC) is a family of serine- and threonine-specific protein kinases that can be activated by calcium and the second messenger diacylglycerol. PKC family members phosphorylate a wide variety of protein targets and are known to be involved in diverse cellular signaling pathways. PKC family members also serve as major receptors for phorbol esters, a class of tumor promoters. Each member of the PKC family has a specific expression profile and is believed to play a distinct role. The protein encoded by this gene is one of the PKC family members. This kinase can be activated rapidly by the agonists of G protein-coupled receptors. It resides in both cytoplasm and nucleus, and its nuclear accumulation is found to be dramatically enhanced in response to its activation. This kinase can also be activated after B-cell antigen receptor (BCR) engagement, which requires intact phospholipase C gamma and the involvement of other PKC family members.
