= RASGRP4 =

Protein-coding gene in the species Homo sapiens

Identifiers
- Aliases: RASGRP4, RAS guanyl releasing protein 4
- External IDs: OMIM: 607320; MGI: 2386851; GeneCards: RASGRP4

Gene location (Human)
Chr.	Chromosome 19 (human)
Band	19q13.2	Start	38,409,051 bp
Band	19q13.2	End	38,426,305 bp

Gene location (Mouse)
Chr.	Chromosome 7 (mouse)
Band	7 16.94 cM|7 B1	Start	28,834,276 bp
Band	7 16.94 cM|7 B1	End	28,853,386 bp
RNA expression pattern
Bgee	Human / Mouse (ortholog); Top expressed in: granulocyte; monocyte; blood; spleen; gonad; bone marrow cell; right lung; appendix; upper lobe of left lung; right coronary artery / Top expressed in: granulocyte; blastocyst; morula; yolk sac; embryo; embryo; thymus; lip; esophagus; tail of embryo; More reference expression data
BioGPS	n/a
Gene ontology
Molecular function	calcium ion binding; diacylglycerol binding; guanyl-nucleotide exchange factor activity; metal ion binding; GTP-dependent protein binding
Cellular component	cytoplasm; cytosol; plasma membrane; membrane
Biological process	myeloid cell differentiation; positive regulation of Ras protein signal transduction; response to extracellular stimulus; cell differentiation; intracellular signal transduction; cell population proliferation; transmembrane receptor protein tyrosine kinase signaling pathway; activation of phospholipase C activity; MAPK cascade; regulation of G protein-coupled receptor signaling pathway; small GTPase mediated signal transduction
Sources:Amigo / QuickGO
Orthologs
Databases	NCBI: entry; OMA: entry
Species	Human	Mouse
Entrez	115727	233046
Ensembl	ENSG00000171777	ENSMUSG00000030589
UniProt	Q8TDF6	Q8BTM9
RefSeq (mRNA)	NM_001146202; NM_001146203; NM_001146204; NM_001146205; NM_001146206 NM_001146207; NM_052949; NM_170602; NM_170603; NM_170604	NM_001174155; NM_145149
RefSeq (protein)	NP_001139674; NP_001139675; NP_001139676; NP_001139677; NP_001139678 NP_001139679; NP_733749	NP_001167626; NP_660131
Location (UCSC)	Chr 19: 38.41 – 38.43 Mb	Chr 7: 28.83 – 28.85 Mb
PubMed search
- Wikidata
View/Edit Human	View/Edit Mouse

RAS guanyl releasing protein 4 is a protein in humans that is encoded by the RASGRP4 gene in chromosome 19.

The protein encoded by this gene is a member of the Ras guanyl nucleotide-releasing protein (RasGRP) family of Ras guanine nucleotide exchange factors. It contains a Ras exchange motif, a diacylglycerol-binding domain, and two calcium-binding EF hands. This protein was shown to activate H-Ras in a cation-dependent manner in vitro. Expression of this protein in myeloid cell lines was found to be correlated with elevated level of activated RAS protein, and the RAS activation can be greatly enhanced by phorbol ester treatment, which suggested a role of this protein in diacylglycerol regulated cell signaling pathways. Studies of a mast cell leukemia cell line expressing substantial amounts of abnormal transcripts of this gene indicated that this gene may play an important role in the final stages of mast cell development. Multiple transcript variants encoding different isoforms have been found for this gene. [provided by RefSeq, Apr 2009].
