= RASGRP2 =

Protein-coding gene in the species Homo sapiens

Identifiers
- Aliases: RASGRP2, CALDAG-GEFI, CDC25L, RAS guanyl releasing protein 2
- External IDs: OMIM: 605577; MGI: 1333849; GeneCards: RASGRP2
Available structures
PDB	Ortholog search: PDBe RCSB
PDB	List of PDB id codes 2MA2

Gene location (Human)
Chr.	Chromosome 11 (human)
Band	11q13.1	Start	64,726,911 bp
Band	11q13.1	End	64,745,456 bp
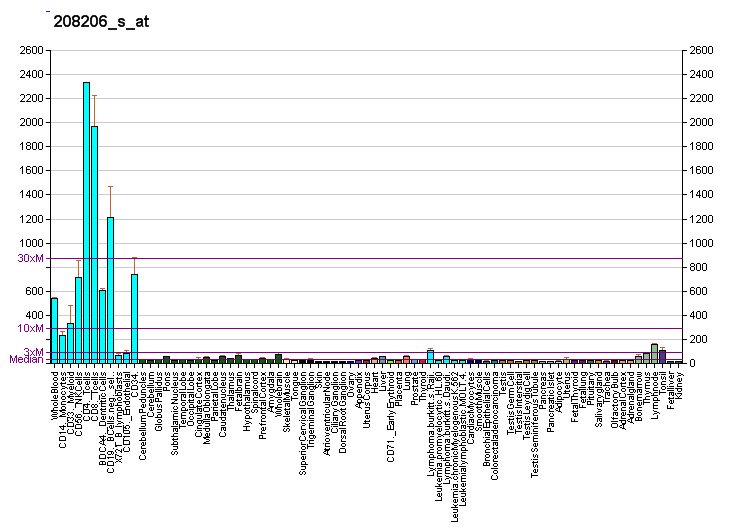

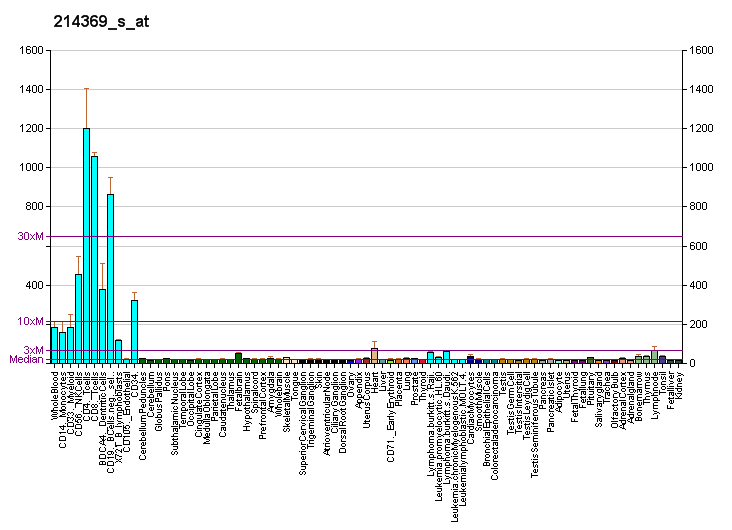
RNA expression pattern
Bgee	Human / Mouse (ortholog); Top expressed in: granulocyte; spleen; monocyte; apex of heart; right coronary artery; popliteal artery; blood; tibial arteries; lymph node; left coronary artery / n/a; More reference expression data
BioGPS	More reference expression data
Gene ontology
Molecular function	calcium ion binding; metal ion binding; diacylglycerol binding; lipid binding; guanyl-nucleotide exchange factor activity
Cellular component	cytoplasm; cytosol; cell projection; membrane; plasma membrane; synapse; ruffle membrane; cell junction; neuron projection
Biological process	cellular response to calcium ion; intracellular signal transduction; small GTPase mediated signal transduction; positive regulation of GTPase activity; regulation of cell growth; Ras protein signal transduction; signal transduction; regulation of molecular function
Sources:Amigo / QuickGO
Orthologs
Databases	NCBI: entry; OMA: entry
Species	Human	Mouse
Entrez	10235	19395
Ensembl	ENSG00000068831	ENSMUSG00000032946
UniProt	Q7LDG7	Q9QUG9
RefSeq (mRNA)	NM_001098670; NM_001098671; NM_005825; NM_153819; NM_001318398	NM_011242
RefSeq (protein)	NP_001092140; NP_001092141; NP_001305327; NP_722541	NP_035372; NP_001351991; NP_001351992
Location (UCSC)	Chr 11: 64.73 – 64.75 Mb	n/a
PubMed search
- Wikidata
View/Edit Human	View/Edit Mouse

RAS guanyl-releasing protein 2 is a protein that in humans is encoded by the RASGRP2 gene.

The protein encoded by this gene is a brain-enriched nucleotide exchange factor that contains an N-terminal GEF domain, 2 tandem repeats of EF-hand calcium-binding motifs, and a C-terminal diacylglycerol/phorbol ester-binding domain. This protein can activate small GTPases, including RAS and RAP1/RAS3. The nucleotide exchange activity of this protein can be stimulated by calcium and diacylglycerol. Two alternatively spliced transcript variants of this gene, encoding distinct isoforms, have been reported.

== Clinical significance ==
Mutations in RASGRP2 are associated with severe bleeding.
