= RASGRP3 =

Protein-coding gene in the species Homo sapiens

Identifiers
- Aliases: RASGRP3, GRP3, RAS guanyl releasing protein 3
- External IDs: OMIM: 609531; MGI: 3028579; GeneCards: RASGRP3

Gene location (Human)
Chr.	Chromosome 2 (human)
Band	2p22.3	Start	33,436,324 bp
Band	2p22.3	End	33,564,750 bp

Gene location (Mouse)
Chr.	Chromosome 17 (mouse)
Band	17|17 E2	Start	75,742,891 bp
Band	17|17 E2	End	75,836,049 bp
RNA expression pattern
Bgee	Human / Mouse (ortholog); Top expressed in: corpus callosum; inferior ganglion of vagus nerve; C1 segment; subthalamic nucleus; internal globus pallidus; superior vestibular nucleus; pons; left ventricle; lymph node; muscle of thigh / Top expressed in: iris; retinal pigment epithelium; endothelial cell of lymphatic vessel; mesenteric lymph nodes; lumbar subsegment of spinal cord; medial head of gastrocnemius muscle; triceps brachii muscle; sternocleidomastoid muscle; left lung lobe; primitive streak; More reference expression data
BioGPS	n/a
Gene ontology
Molecular function	calcium ion binding; guanyl-nucleotide exchange factor activity; GTPase activator activity; signal transducer activity; metal ion binding; kinase binding; protein binding; diacylglycerol binding
Cellular component	cytoplasm; plasma membrane; integral component of plasma membrane; perinuclear region of cytoplasm; guanyl-nucleotide exchange factor complex; intracellular anatomical structure
Biological process	intracellular signal transduction; regulation of GTPase activity; small GTPase mediated signal transduction; MAPK cascade; positive regulation of GTPase activity; Ras protein signal transduction
Sources:Amigo / QuickGO
Orthologs
Databases	NCBI: entry; OMA: entry
Species	Human	Mouse
Entrez	25780	240168
Ensembl	ENSG00000152689	ENSMUSG00000071042
UniProt	Q8IV61	Q6NZH9
RefSeq (mRNA)	NM_001139488; NM_015376; NM_170672; NM_001349975; NM_001349976 NM_001349977; NM_001349978; NM_001349979; NM_001349980; NM_001349981	NM_001166493; NM_207246; NM_001360103
RefSeq (protein)	NP_001132960; NP_056191; NP_733772; NP_001336904; NP_001336905 NP_001336906; NP_001336907; NP_001336908; NP_001336909; NP_001336910	NP_001159965; NP_997129; NP_001347032
Location (UCSC)	Chr 2: 33.44 – 33.56 Mb	Chr 17: 75.74 – 75.84 Mb
PubMed search
- Wikidata
View/Edit Human	View/Edit Mouse

Ras guanyl-releasing protein 3 is a protein that in humans is encoded by the RASGRP3 gene.

== Function ==
Members of the RAS (see HRAS; MIM 190020) subfamily of GTPases function in signal transduction as GTP/GDP-regulated switches that cycle between inactive GDP- and active GTP-bound states. Guanine nucleotide exchange factors (GEFs), such as RASGRP3, serve as RAS activators by promoting acquisition of GTP to maintain the active GTP-bound state and are the key link between cell surface receptors and RAS activation (Rebhun et al., 2000).

== Interactions ==
RASGRP3 has been shown to interact with PRKCD.
