= Rhamnogalacturonan endolyase =

Identifiers
- EC no.: 4.2.2.23

Databases
- BRENDA: enzyme data
- ExPASy: NiceZyme view
- KEGG: enzyme entry
- MetaCyc: metabolic pathway
- Rhea: reactions
- PDB structures: RCSB PDB PDBe PDBsum
Search
- PMC: articles
- PubMed: articles
- NCBI: proteins

The enzyme Rhamnogalacturonan endolyase (EC 4.2.2.23, rhamnogalacturonase B, α-L-rhamnopyranosyl-(1→4)-α-D-galactopyranosyluronide lyase, Rgase B, rhamnogalacturonan α-Lrhamnopyranosyl-(1,4)-α-D-galactopyranosyluronide lyase, RG-lyase, YesW, RGL4, Rgl11A, Rgl11Y, RhiE) is an enzyme with systematic name α-L-rhamnopyranosyl-(1→4)-α-D-galactopyranosyluronate endolyase. catalyses the following process:

Endotype eliminative cleavage of L-α-rhamnopyranosyl-(1→4)-α-D-galactopyranosyluronic acid bonds of rhamnogalacturonan I domains in ramified hairy regions of pectin leaving L-rhamnopyranose at the reducing end and 4-deoxy-4,5-unsaturated Dgalactopyranosyluronic acid at the non-reducing end.

The enzyme is part of the degradation system for rhamnogalacturonan I in Bacillus subtilis strain 168 and Aspergillus aculeatus.
