= RGL2 =

Protein-coding gene in the species Homo sapiens

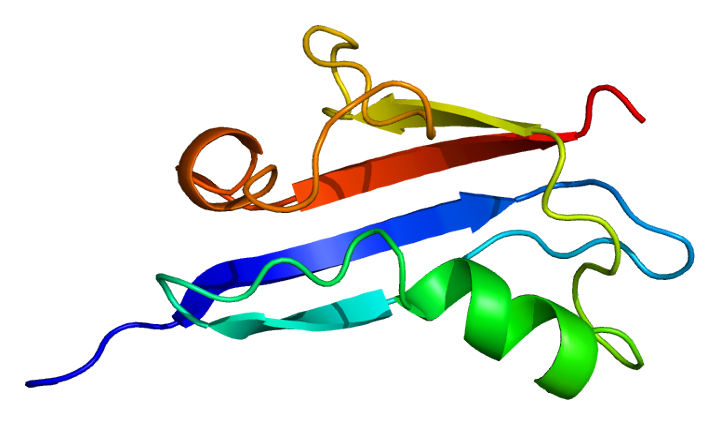

Identifiers
- Aliases: RGL2, HKE1.5, KE1.5, RAB2L, ral guanine nucleotide dissociation stimulator like 2
- External IDs: OMIM: 602306; MGI: 107483; GeneCards: RGL2

Gene location (Human)
Chr.	Chromosome 6 (human)
Band	6p21.32	Start	33,291,654 bp
Band	6p21.32	End	33,298,942 bp

Gene location (Mouse)
Chr.	Chromosome 17 (mouse)
Band	17|17 B1	Start	34,148,517 bp
Band	17|17 B1	End	34,156,661 bp
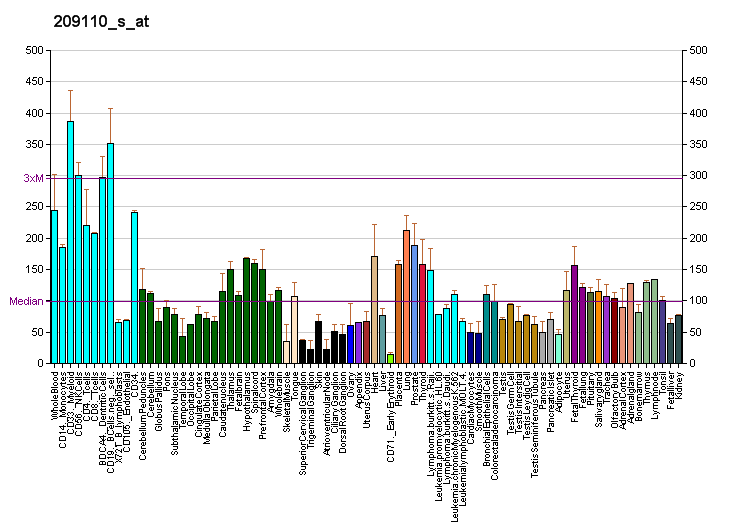
RNA expression pattern
Bgee	Human / Mouse (ortholog); Top expressed in: spleen; right uterine tube; pituitary gland; anterior pituitary; right lobe of thyroid gland; fundus; left lobe of thyroid gland; prostate; right adrenal cortex; salivary gland / Top expressed in: granulocyte; neural layer of retina; lip; yolk sac; thymus; external carotid artery; saccule; internal carotid artery; Rostral migratory stream; ventricular zone; More reference expression data
BioGPS	More reference expression data
Gene ontology
Molecular function	protein binding; guanyl-nucleotide exchange factor activity
Cellular component	intracellular anatomical structure; cellular component
Biological process	small GTPase mediated signal transduction; Ras protein signal transduction; signal transduction; negative regulation of cardiac muscle cell apoptotic process; regulation of Ral protein signal transduction; positive regulation of phosphatidylinositol 3-kinase signaling; regulation of molecular function
Sources:Amigo / QuickGO
Orthologs
Databases	NCBI: entry; OMA: entry
Species	Human	Mouse
Entrez	5863	19732
Ensembl	ENSG00000228736; ENSG00000237441; ENSG00000237825; ENSG00000224841; ENSG00000206282 n/a	ENSMUSG00000041354
UniProt	O15211	Q61193
RefSeq (mRNA)	NM_001243738; NM_004761	NM_009059
RefSeq (protein)	NP_001230667; NP_004752	NP_033085
Location (UCSC)	Chr 6: 33.29 – 33.3 Mb	Chr 17: 34.15 – 34.16 Mb
PubMed search
- Wikidata
View/Edit Human	View/Edit Mouse

Ral guanine nucleotide dissociation stimulator-like 2 is a protein that in humans is encoded by the RGL2 gene.

== Interactions ==
RGL2 has been shown to interact with HRAS.
