= RASGRP1 =

Protein-coding gene in the species Homo sapiens

Identifiers
- Aliases: RASGRP1, CALDAG-GEFI, CALDAG-GEFII, RASGRP, hRasGRP1, RAS guanyl releasing protein 1, IMD64
- External IDs: OMIM: 603962; MGI: 1314635; GeneCards: RASGRP1
Available structures
PDB	Ortholog search: PDBe RCSB
PDB	List of PDB id codes 4L9M, 4L9U

Gene location (Human)
Chr.	Chromosome 15 (human)
Band	15q14	Start	38,488,103 bp
Band	15q14	End	38,565,575 bp

Gene location (Mouse)
Chr.	Chromosome 2 (mouse)
Band	2 E5|2 59.19 cM	Start	117,110,474 bp
Band	2 E5|2 59.19 cM	End	117,173,482 bp
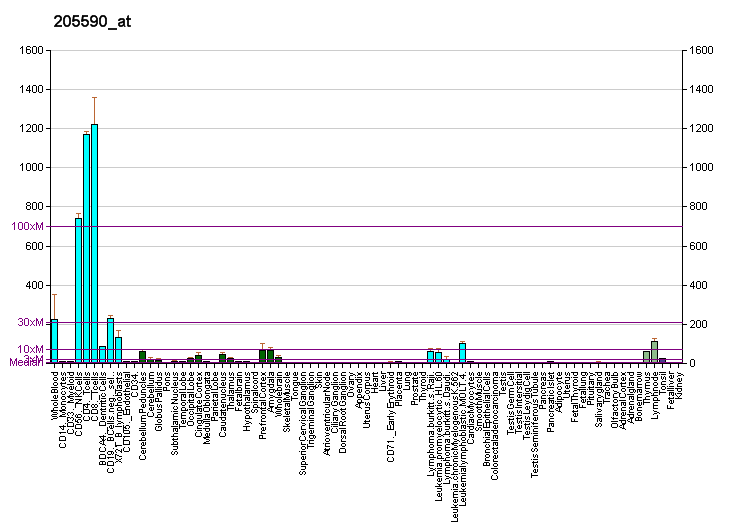
RNA expression pattern
Bgee	Human / Mouse (ortholog); Top expressed in: pons; cerebellar vermis; Brodmann area 23; lateral nuclear group of thalamus; endothelial cell; Brodmann area 46; entorhinal cortex; cerebellar hemisphere; orbitofrontal cortex; middle temporal gyrus / Top expressed in: olfactory tubercle; lateral geniculate nucleus; medial geniculate nucleus; medial dorsal nucleus; subiculum; nucleus accumbens; pontine nuclei; superior frontal gyrus; globus pallidus; primary motor cortex; More reference expression data
BioGPS	More reference expression data
Gene ontology
Molecular function	calcium ion binding; protein homodimerization activity; phosphatidylcholine binding; zinc ion binding; phosphatidylserine binding; metal ion binding; diacylglycerol binding; lipid binding; guanyl-nucleotide exchange factor activity; GTPase activator activity
Cellular component	cytoplasm; Golgi apparatus; endoplasmic reticulum membrane; membrane; mast cell granule; Golgi membrane; endoplasmic reticulum; cytosol; plasma membrane; intracellular anatomical structure
Biological process	cell differentiation; positive regulation of protein phosphorylation; positive regulation of T cell differentiation in thymus; intracellular signal transduction; regulation of phospholipase C activity; positive regulation of MAP kinase activity; positive regulation of natural killer cell differentiation; inflammatory response to antigenic stimulus; vesicle transport along microtubule; activation of GTPase activity; regulation of GTPase activity; cytokine production; positive regulation of Ras protein signal transduction; positive regulation of natural killer cell activation; positive regulation of JNK cascade; secretory granule localization; MAPK cascade; regulation of phosphatidylinositol 3-kinase signaling; positive regulation of GTPase activity; positive regulation of granulocyte macrophage colony-stimulating factor production; protein complex oligomerization; positive regulation of ERK1 and ERK2 cascade; regulation of ERK1 and ERK2 cascade; positive regulation of tumor necrosis factor production; Ras protein signal transduction; mast cell degranulation; regulation of p38MAPK cascade; positive regulation of natural killer cell mediated cytotoxicity; signal transduction; small GTPase mediated signal transduction
Sources:Amigo / QuickGO
Orthologs
Databases	NCBI: entry; OMA: entry
Species	Human	Mouse
Entrez	10125	19419
Ensembl	ENSG00000172575	ENSMUSG00000027347
UniProt	O95267	Q9Z1S3
RefSeq (mRNA)	NM_001128602; NM_001306086; NM_005739	NM_011246
RefSeq (protein)	NP_001122074; NP_001293015; NP_005730	NP_035376
Location (UCSC)	Chr 15: 38.49 – 38.57 Mb	Chr 2: 117.11 – 117.17 Mb
PubMed search
- Wikidata
View/Edit Human	View/Edit Mouse

RAS guanyl-releasing protein 1 is a protein that in humans is encoded by the RASGRP1 gene.

== Function ==
RAS guanyl nucleotide-releasing protein (RASGRP) is a member of a family of genes characterized by the presence of a Ras superfamily guanine nucleotide exchange factor (GEF) domain. It functions as a diacylglycerol (DAG)-regulated nucleotide exchange factor specifically activating Ras through the exchange of bound GDP for GTP. It activates the Erk/MAP kinase cascade and regulates T-cells and B-cells development, homeostasis and differentiation.

== Gene ==
Alternatively spliced transcript variants encoding different isoforms have been identified. The corresponding rat gene rbc7, which lacks a 5-prime exon, represents a 5-prime and 3-prime truncated version of a larger normal rat transcript that encodes a predicted 90-kD protein. This shorter transcript has not been found in humans.

== Clinical significance ==
In November 2016 a 12-year-old patient was hospitalized for repetitive infections. Scientists have assumed that a genetic problem might be the reason. More specifically, the genetic cause is a defect of the RASGRP1 gene which makes it inactive.

RASGRP1 plays a role in the functions of natural killer cell dyneins. Since dyneins are motor proteins, their function is to circulate the elements inside the cells. Dr. Orange's laboratory studies have established a functional link between the defects of natural killer cells and dyneins, which in combination with Other observations led doctors to try the drug lenalidommide to treat the patient. The drug was able to reverse certain effects of the mutation RASGRP1.
