= Diacylglycerol kinase =

Class of enzymes

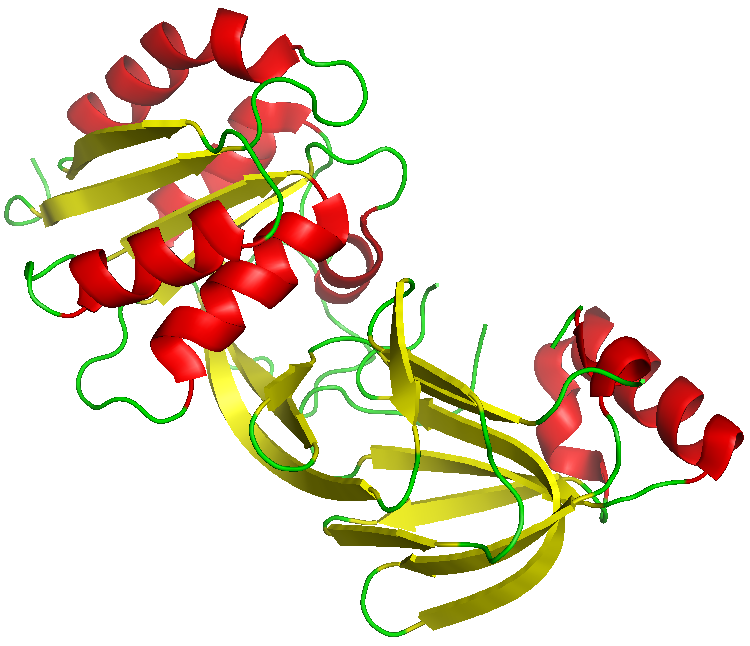
- DgkB, soluble DAGK from Staphylococcus aureus. α-helices in red, β-strands in yellow, coils in green.

Identifiers
- EC no.: 2.7.1.107
- CAS no.: 60382-71-0

Databases
- BRENDA: enzyme data
- ExPASy: NiceZyme view
- KEGG: enzyme entry
- MetaCyc: metabolic pathway
- Rhea: reactions
- PDB structures: RCSB PDB PDBe PDBsum
Search
- PMC: articles
- PubMed: articles
- NCBI: proteins

Prokaryotic diacylglycerol kinase

Identifiers
- Symbol: DAGK_prokar
- Pfam: PF01219
- InterPro: IPR000829
- PROSITE: PDOC00820
- OPM superfamily: 196
- OPM protein: 4d2e
Available protein structures:
- PDB: IPR000829 PF01219 (ECOD; PDBsum)
- AlphaFold: IPR000829; PF01219

Diacylglycerol kinase catalytic domain

Identifiers
- Symbol: DAGK_cat
- Pfam: PF00781
- Pfam clan: CL0240
- InterPro: IPR001206
- SMART: DAGKc
Available protein structures:
- PDB: IPR001206 PF00781 (ECOD; PDBsum)
- AlphaFold: IPR001206; PF00781

Diacylglycerol kinase accessory domain

Identifiers
- Symbol: DAGK_acc
- Pfam: PF00609
- InterPro: IPR000756
- SMART: DAGKa
Available protein structures:
- PDB: IPR000756 PF00609 (ECOD; PDBsum)
- AlphaFold: IPR000756; PF00609

Diacylglycerol kinase (DGK or DAGK) is a family of enzymes that catalyzes the conversion of diacylglycerol (DAG) to phosphatidic acid (PA), utilizing ATP as a source of the phosphate. In non-stimulated cells, DGK activity is low, allowing DAG to be used for glycerophospholipid biosynthesis, but on receptor activation of the phosphoinositide pathway, DGK activity increases, driving the conversion of DAG to PA. As both lipids are thought to function as bioactive lipid signaling molecules with distinct cellular targets, DGK therefore occupies an important position, effectively serving as a switch by terminating the signalling of one lipid while simultaneously activating signalling by another.

In bacteria, DGK is very small (13 to 15 kDa) membrane protein which seems to contain three transmembrane domains. The best conserved region is a stretch of 12 residues which are located in a cytoplasmic loop between the second and third transmembrane domains. Some Gram-positive bacteria also encode a soluble diacylglycerol kinase capable of reintroducing DAG into the phospholipid biosynthesis pathway. DAG accumulates in Gram-positive bacteria as a result of the transfer of glycerol-1-phosphate moieties from phosphatidylglycerol to lipotechoic acid.

== Mammalian DGK Isoforms ==
Currently, nine members of the DGK family have been cloned and identified. Although all family members have conserved catalytic domains and two cysteine rich domains, they are further classified into five groups according to the presence of additional functional domains and substrate specificity. These are as follows:

- Type 1 - DGK-α, DGK-β, DGK-γ - contain EF-hand motifs and a recoverin homology domain
- Type 2 - DGK-δ, DGK-η - contain a pleckstrin homology domain
- Type 3 - DGK-ε - has specificity for arachidonate-containing DAG
- Type 4 - DGK-ζ, DGK-ι - contain a MARCKS homology domain, ankyrin repeats, a C-terminal nuclear localisation signal, and a PDZ-binding motif.
- Type 5 - DGK-θ - contains a third cysteine-rich domain, a pleckstrin homology domain and a proline rich region

== Clinical Significance ==
In a phenotypic screen for small molecules that could stimulate interleukin-2 (IL2) secretion from primary T cells in the presence or absence of PD-1 suppression, BMS-684 was found to be able to act as a T cell checkpoint inhibitor. Further optimization led to the compound BMS-496. Using lipid-based photoaffinity probes, DGKα was identified as the primary target of BMS-496. BMS-496 induces translocation of DGKα to the plasma membrane. Further study found that these compounds also inhibit DGKζ and similarly induce translocation of DGKζ to the plasma membrane. Preclinical studies found that this strategy of dual DGKα/ζ inhibition can potentiate the anticancer effects of PD-1 blockade.
