= LU domain =

Protein domain

u-PAR/Ly-6 domain
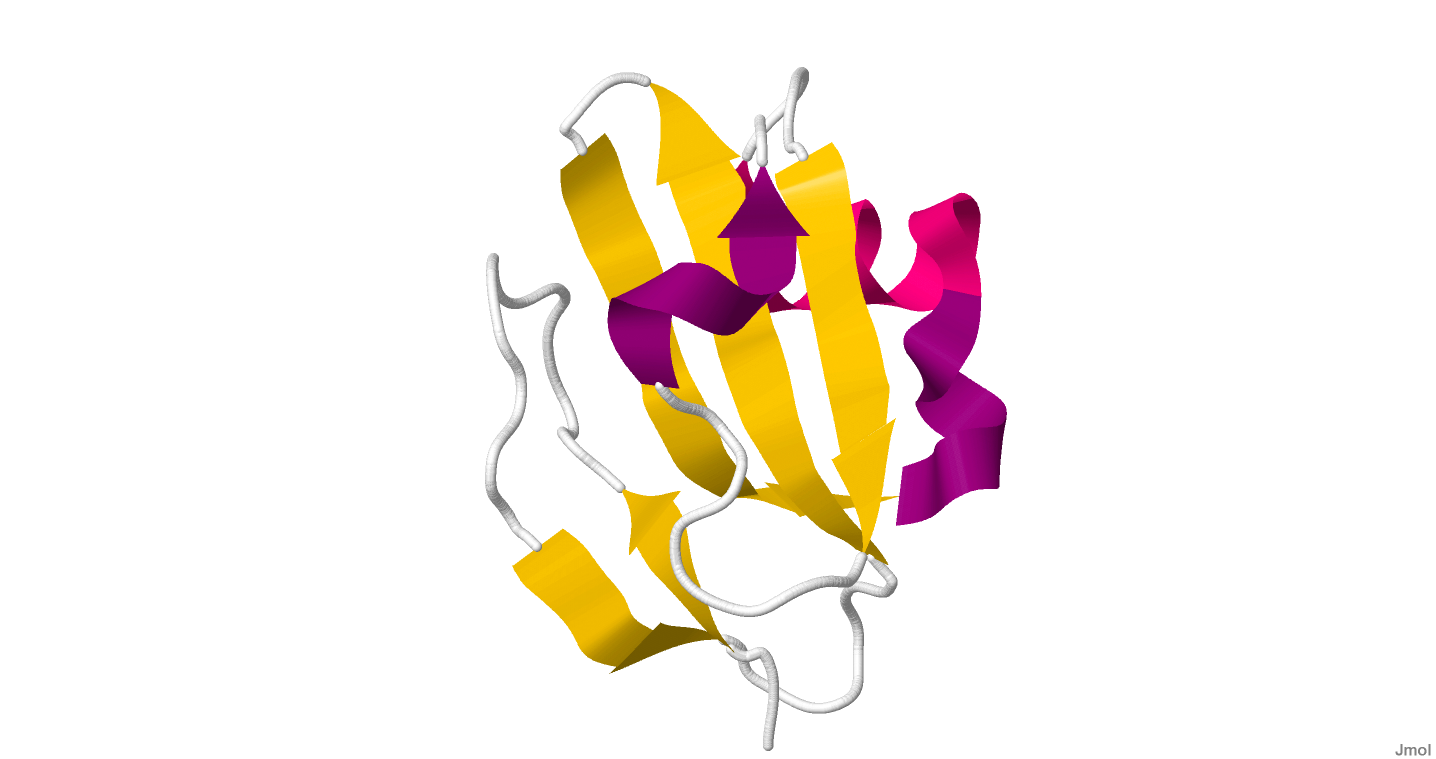
- Crystallographic structure of non-glycosylated human CD59.

Identifiers
- Symbol: UPAR_LY6
- Pfam: PF00021
- InterPro: IPR001526
- PROSITE: PDOC00756
- CATH: 1erg
- SCOP2: 1erg / SCOPe / SUPFAM
- CDD: cd00117
Available protein structures:
- PDB: 1cds :28-95 1cdr :28-95 1cdq :28-95 1erg :28-95 1ywhC:25-99 1vyeA:23-80 IPR001526 PF00021 (ECOD; PDBsum)
- AlphaFold: IPR001526; PF00021

The LU domain (Ly-6 antigen/uPAR) is an evolutionarily conserved protein domain of the three-finger protein superfamily. This domain is found in the extracellular domains of cell-surface receptors and in either GPI-anchored or secreted globular proteins, for example the Ly-6 family, CD59, and Sgp-2.

A variety of GPI-linked cell-surface glycoproteins are composed of one or more copies of a conserved LU domain of about 100 amino-acid residues. Among these proteins, most contain only a single LU domain, though small numbers of exceptions are known; well-studied family member uPAR has three tandem LU domains.

== Structure ==
This domain folds into five antiparallel beta sheets, a structure common to the three-finger protein family. The domain typically contains ten well-conserved cysteine residues involved in five disulfide bonds, though some examples such as two of the three uPAR domains have fewer.

== Examples ==
Besides uPAR, other receptors with LU domains include members of the transforming growth factor beta receptor (TGF-beta) superfamily, such as the activin type 2 receptor; and bone morphogenetic protein receptor, type IA. Other LU domain proteins are small globular proteins such as CD59 antigen, LYNX1, SLURP1, and SLURP2.

=== Subfamilies ===
- Urokinase plasminogen activator surface receptor InterPro: IPR003631
- Cell-surface glycoprotein Ly-6/CD59 InterPro: IPR003632

=== Human proteins containing this domain ===
ARS; CD177; CD59; LY6D; LY6E; LY6H; LYNX1; LYPD2; LYPD3; LYPD4; LYPD5; LYPD6; PLAUR; PSCA; SLURP2; SLURP1; SPACA4; TEX101;

== Functions ==
Many LU domain containing proteins are involved in cholinergic signaling and bind acetylcholine receptors, notably linking their function to a common mechanism of 3FTx toxicity. Members of the Ly6/uPAR family are believed to be the evolutionary ancestors of the three-finger toxin (3FTx). Other LU proteins, such as the CD59 antigen, have well-studied functions in regulation of the immune system.
