= Ly6 =

Ly6 also known as lymphocyte antigen 6 or urokinase-type plasminogen activator receptor (uPAR) is family of proteins that share a common structure but differ in their tissue expression patterns and function. Ly6 are cysteine-rich proteins that form disulfide bridges and contain a LU domain. These proteins are GPI-anchored to the cell membrane or are secreted. A total of 35 human and 61 mouse Ly6 family members have been identified. Depending on which tissues they are expressed in, LY6 family members have different roles. They are expressed in various types of tissues and their expression dependent on the stage of cell differentiation. For example, they are involved in cell proliferation, cell migration, cell–cell interactions, immune cell maturation, macrophage activation, and cytokine production. Their overexpression or dysregulation, for example due to point mutations, is associated with tumorogenesis and autoimmune diseases. This family was discovered in the 1970s, and these proteins are still used as markers of distinct stage of leukocyte differentiation.

== Gene organization ==
Genes encoding human Ly6 family members are located in clusters on chromosomes 6, 8, 11 and 19. In the murine genome family members are located on chromosomes 17, 15, 9 and 7, respectively. Genes encoding Ly6 proteins with one LU domain consist of 3 exons and 2 introns. The first exon encodes the signal peptide, Exons 2 and 3 encode the LU domain, and exon 3 also encodes the GPI anchor.

== Protein structure ==
Ly6 proteins are characterized by the LU domain. Typically, they contain one LU domain, but some members of the family have multiple LU domains. The LU domain consists of 60-80 AA and contains 10 cysteines arranged in a specific pattern that allows the creation of 5 disulfide bridges which in turn allow the formation of a three-fingered (3F) structural motif.

Based on their subcellular localization, these proteins are classified as GPI-anchored to the cell membrane or secreted.

== Expression ==
Although the Ly6 family members share a common structure, their expression varies in different tissues and is regulated depending on the stage of cell differentiation.

Many Ly6 family members are expressed in hematopoietic precursors and differentiated hematopoietic cells in a lineage-specific manner and making them useful cell surface markers for leukocytes, facilitating identification of distinct leukocyte sub-population.

Further, the Ly6 family proteins are also expressed, for example, by sperm, neurons, keratinocytes and epithelial cells.

== Function ==
Ly6 family proteins have different functions depending on expression in different tissues. They play an important role in the immune response to infection and maintaining homeostasis in response to varying environmental conditions. It is involved in cell proliferation, cell migration, cell–cell interactions, immune cell maturation, macrophage activation, and cytokine production. It is also involved in complement activity, neuronal activity, angiogenesis, tumorogenesis and wound healing.

== Clinical relevance ==
Many Ly6 family proteins (with the notable exception of SLURP1) are over-expressed in inflamed tissues and in tumors. They are therefore used as tumor markers and are also potential therapeutic targets.

Some point mutations in Ly6 family proteins are associated with autoimmune diseases, such as psoriasis vulgaris.

== Ly6 proteins ==
Examples of Ly6 proteins include:

- LY6E
- LYNX1
- LYPD1
- LYPD3
- LYPD5
- LYPD8
- LYPD6B
