= Three-finger protein =

Protein superfamily

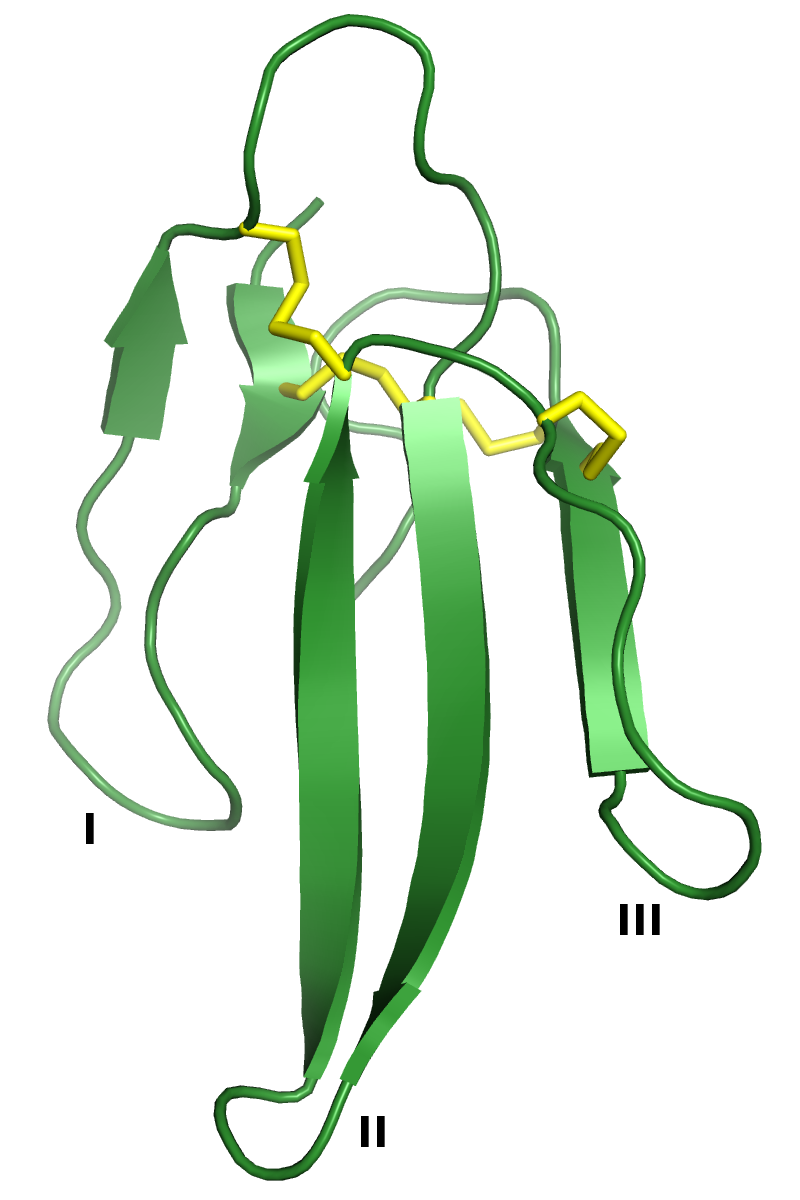
- Erabutoxin A, a neurotoxin that is a member of the three-finger toxin superfamily. The three "fingers" are labeled I, II, and III, and the four conserved disulfide bonds are shown in yellow. Rendered from PDB: 1QKD.

Identifiers
- Symbol: ?
- CATH: 1qkd
- SCOP2: 1qkd / SCOPe / SUPFAM

Three-finger proteins or three-finger protein domains (3FP or TFPD) are a protein superfamily consisting of small, roughly 60-80 amino acid residue protein domains with a common tertiary structure: three beta strand loops extended from a hydrophobic core stabilized by disulfide bonds. The family is named for the outstretched "fingers" of the three loops. Members of the family have no enzymatic activity, but are capable of forming protein-protein interactions with high specificity and affinity. The founding members of the family, also the best characterized by structure, are the three-finger toxins found in snake venom, which have a variety of pharmacological effects, most typically by disruption of cholinergic signaling. The family is also represented in non-toxic proteins, which have a wide taxonomic distribution; 3FP domains occur in the extracellular domains of some cell-surface receptors as well as in GPI-anchored and secreted globular proteins, usually involved in signaling.

== Three-finger toxins ==
The founding members of the 3FP family are the three-finger toxins (3FTx) often found in snake venom. 3FTx proteins are widely distributed in venomous snake families, but are particularly enriched in the family Elapidae, in which the relative proportion of 3FTx to other venom toxins can reach 95%. Many 3FTx proteins are neurotoxins, though the mechanism of toxicity varies significantly even among proteins of relatively high sequence identity; common protein targets include those involved in cholinergic signaling, such as the nicotinic acetylcholine receptors, muscarinic acetylcholine receptors, and acetylcholinesterase. Another large subfamily of 3FTx proteins is the cardiotoxins (also known as cytotoxins or cytolysins); this group is directly cytotoxic most likely due to interactions with phospholipids and possibly other components of the cell membrane.

== Ly6/uPAR family ==
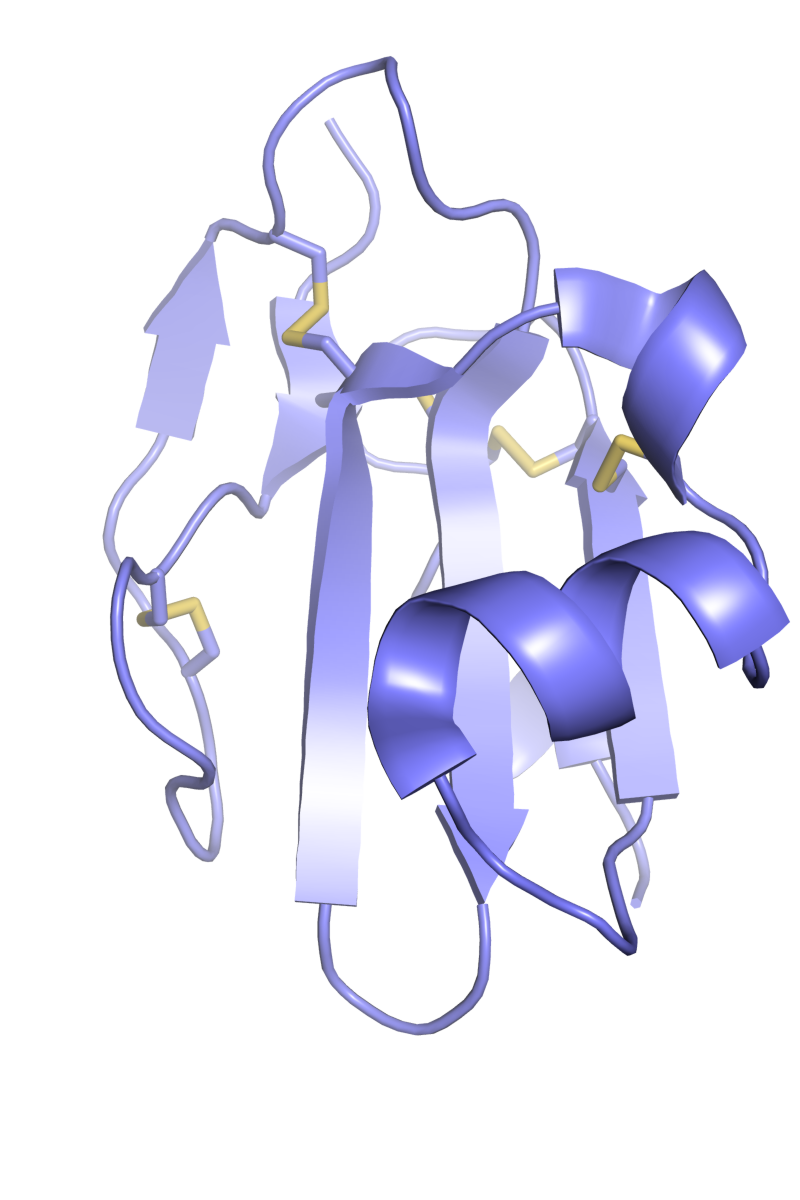
The human CD59 protein, which regulates the complement system.

The Ly6/uPAR family broadly describes a gene family containing three-finger protein domains that are not toxic and not venom components; these are often known as LU domains and can be found in the extracellular domains of cell-surface receptors and in either GPI-anchored or secreted globular proteins. The family is named for two representative groups of members, the small globular protein lymphocyte antigen 6 (LY6) family and the urokinase plasminogen activator receptor (uPAR). Other receptors with LU domains include members of the transforming growth factor beta receptor (TGF-beta) superfamily, such as the activin type 2 receptor; and bone morphogenetic protein receptor, type IA. Other LU domain proteins are small globular proteins such as CD59 antigen, LYNX1, SLURP1, and SLURP2.

Many LU domain containing proteins are involved in cholinergic signaling and bind acetylcholine receptors, notably linking their function to a common mechanism of 3FTx toxicity. Members of the Ly6/uPAR family are believed to be the evolutionary ancestors of 3FTx toxins. Other LU proteins, such as the CD59 antigen, have well-studied functions in regulation of the immune system.

== Gene structure ==
Snake three-finger toxins and the Ly6/uPAR family members share a common gene structure, typically consisting of two introns and three exons. The sequence of the first exon is generally well conserved compared to the other two. The third exon contains the major differentiating features between the two groups, as this is where the C-terminal GPI-anchor peptide common among the Ly6/uPAR globular proteins is encoded.

== Evolution and taxonomic distribution ==
Proteins of the general three-finger fold are widely distributed among metazoans. A 2008 bioinformatics study identified about 45 examples of such proteins, containing up to three three-finger domains, represented in the human genome. A more recent profile of the Ly6/uPAR gene family identified 35 human and at least 61 mouse family members in the organisms' respective genomes.

The three-finger protein family is thought to have expanded through gene duplication in the snake lineage. 3FTx toxins are considered restricted to the Caenophidia, the taxon containing all venomous snakes; however at least one homolog has been identified in the Burmese python, a closely related subgroup. Traditionally, 3FTx genes have been thought to have evolved by repeated events of duplication followed by neofunctionalization and recruitment to gene expression patterns restricted to venom glands. However, it has been argued that this process should be extremely rare and that subfunctionalization better explains the observed distribution. More recently, non-toxic 3FP proteins have been found to be widely expressed in many different tissues in snakes, prompting the alternative hypothesis that proteins of restricted expression in saliva were selectively recruited for toxic functionality.
