= Palmoplantar ectodermal dysplasia =

- Specialty: Dermatology

Palmoplantar ectodermal dysplasia is a cutaneous condition.

Types include:

- Palmoplantar ectodermal dysplasia type 1 or Pachyonychia congenita type I
- Palmoplantar ectodermal dysplasia type 3 or Acrokeratoelastoidosis
- Palmoplantar ectodermal dysplasia type 4 or Papillon–Lefèvre syndrome
- Palmoplantar ectodermal dysplasia type 5 or Tyrosinemia type II
- Palmoplantar ectodermal dysplasia type 6 or Olmsted syndrome
- Palmoplantar ectodermal dysplasia type 8 or Meleda disease

== See also ==
- Ectodermal dysplasia
