= MIRL =

MIRL may refer to:

- Membrane Inhibitor of Reactive Lysis, CD59, a cell surface glycoprotein that inhibits complement-mediated lysis.
- Medium Intensity Runway Lights
