= Suparnostic =

suPARnostic is a simplified double monoclonal antibody sandwich enzyme-linked immunosorbent assay (ELISA) that measures the amount of soluble urokinase plasminogen activator receptor (suPAR) in blood. Elevated plasma suPAR levels have been observed in various infectious, inflammatory and autoimmune diseases. suPAR concentration positively correlates to the activation level of the immune system. suPARnostic can be used as a prognostic tool to determine the severity of a disease within a patient, but is not used as a reliable diagnostic tool, as it can detect the severity of the immune response in a patient, but does not reveal the specific disease from which the patient may be suffering. Recently, increase suPAR levels were shown to be associated with increased risk of systemic inflammatory response syndrome (SIRS)/sepsis, cardiovascular disease, type 2 diabetes, infectious diseases, HIV, cancer tuberculosis, malaria, bacterial and viral CNS infections, rheumatoid arthritis, multiple sclerosis and mortality in the general population.

== Performing the suPARnostic ELISA ==
Performing the suPARnostic ELISA requires two antibodies with high specificity for suPAR. The blood plasma sample from the patient that contains an unknown amount of suPAR is immobilized on the microwells on the clear microtiter plate and a detection antibody forms a complex with suPAR. Between each step the plate is rinsed with a wash buffer to dispose of any proteins that do not specifically bind to any of the wells on the plate. After the final wash step, the plate is developed by adding the TMB substrate to produce a visible signal, which indicates the quantity of suPAR in the sample. The measured absorbance can, based on the values from the standard curve, be converted to the concentration (ng/mL) of suPAR in the sample. This level can then suggest whether or not the patient is experiencing challenges to their immune system.

== Principles ==
The suPARnostic ELISA is a simplified double monoclonal antibody sandwich assay that measures the level of suPAR and suPARII-III in the body . The suPARnostic ELISA utilizes monoclonal mouse and rat antibodies against human suPAR.

The advantages of using monoclonal antibodies compared to using polyclonal antibodies includes: High homogeneity, absence of nonspecific antibodies and no batch-to-batch or lot-to-lot variability. This results in a very robust and reliable assay.

A 'sandwich' is formed of solid-phase antibody, suPAR and peroxidase-conjugated antibody. The concentration (ng/mL plasma) of suPAR in the patient sample is determined via interpolation, based on a calibration curve prepared from seven suPAR standards. Recombinant suPAR standards are calibrated against healthy human blood donor samples. Absorbance is measured using a microtiter plate reader, at 450 nm with a 650 nm reference filter. Measurement of suPAR levels from blood samples provides greater accuracy and precision than measurement from urine or cerebral spinal fluid. suPAR level is not changed by transient illness such as cold. It also remains stable after a blood sample is taken despite storage.

suPARnostic measurements between 0.1 and 4.0 ng/mL suggest that a patient is healthy, with no challenges to their immune system and no signs or symptoms of an opportunistic infection or inflammation; the average level among the population is 3.4 ng/mL. However, a patient's immune system can be considered 'negatively activated' at suPAR levels above 4.0 and up to 6.0 ng/mL, indicating a potential infection or high level of inflammation. In this case, a patient's health is likely to worsen and he or she should be referred for further testing. suPARnostic measurements from 6.0 ng/mL to double digit levels can indicate a serious illness that is progressing rapidly to a critical situation. Patients in the intensive care unit average a level of 10.0 ng/mL. There is no difference in suPAR levels intrinsic to various races; however, the scale varies for male and female.

There are two suPARnostic tests available. The suPARnostic Standard ELISA (Code No. A001) is for research use and large trials, one batch consisting of 41 samples in doublets. The suPARnostic Flex ELISA (Code No. A002) has been developed for clinical applications consisting of 93 samples, is modular and flexible, and gives fully quantitative results in 2 hours.

== Practical Considerations ==
The suPARnostic kit has a refrigerated shelf life of several years and when frozen, may be kept for longer. The kit should sit at room temperature for half an hour before use but it may be held at room temperature for as long as three to four hours. The suPARnostic Flex ELISA (Code No. A002) is able to provide fully quantitative results in 2 hours. suPARnostic is run as large, batch test with up to 41 samples in doublets for research purposes or 93 samples for clinical use at one time.

Although suPARnostic currently does not have FDA approval, it is CE/IVD marked for distribution throughout Europe. suPAR is a prognostic test to indicate general health, and it cannot be used as a diagnostic tool to suggest a particular illness. suPAR cannot be used in the detection of brain tumors because the suPAR molecule cannot migrate through the blood brain barrier.
