= Jochen Reiser =

German nephrologist (born 1971)

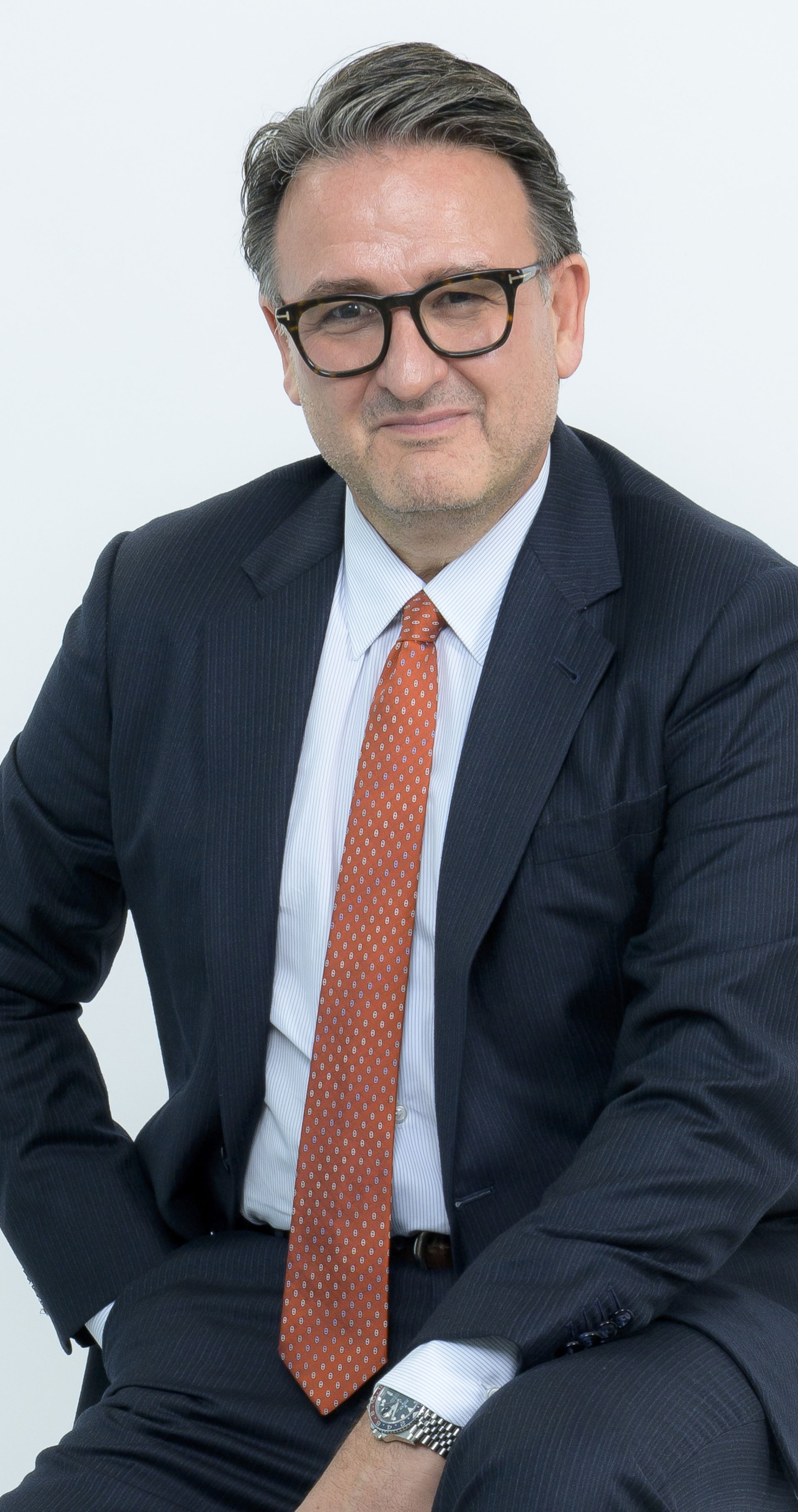
- Born: June 23, 1971 (age 55); Remchingen, Germany
- Education: Ruprecht-Karls-Universität Heidelberg
- Known for: Podocytes, Glomerular diseases, Chronic kidney disease (CKD), Focal segmental glomerulosclerosis (FSGS), Soluble urokinase plasminogen activator receptor (suPAR).
- Awards: Young Investigator Award (German Society of Nephrology, 2005); Scholar Award for Amino Acid Research (Ajinomoto, 2007); Provost’s Award for Scholarly Activity (University of Miami, 2012); Franz Volhard Award (German Society of Nephrology, 2016); Research Faculty Award (Rush University Medical Center, 2017); Hero of Medicine Award (Halo Science, 2019); Marilyn G. Farquhar Lifetime Research Achievement Award (International Society of Glomerular Diseases, 2025)
- Scientific career
- Fields: Nephrology
- Workplaces: University of Texas Medical Branch
- Website: Office of the President - UTMB Health

Jochen Reiser (born June 23, 1971, in Remchingen, Germany) is a physician-scientist-executive, Professor (John Sealy School of Medicine), the John D. Stobo, MD Distinguished Chair, a healthcare leader, and a biotechnology company co-founder. He is the President of the University of Texas Medical Branch (UTMB) and CEO of the UTMB Health System, which includes the oldest medical school and nursing school in Texas. He oversees the enterprise which includes multiple campuses, five health science colleges, the Galveston National Laboratory (BSL-4) and the Correctional Health Care Services for most of Texas.

Prior to joining the University of Texas Medical Branch, he served as the Ralph C Brown Professor and the Chairman of Medicine at Rush University Medical Center. Reiser's research has provided important mechanistic insights into the molecular pathogenesis of kidney diseases.

Reiser discovered the role of suPAR (soluble urokinase plasminogen activator receptor) as a global, circulating risk factor for chronic kidney disease (CKD) and for acute kidney injury (AKI).

suPAR is investigated as potential causative agent contributing to many kidney diseases including focal segmental glomerulosclerosis (FSGS). These studies have broad clinical significance and lay the foundation for creation of novel diagnostics and pharmaco-therapeutics with potential benefit for a large patient population. His studies on suPAR molecule were featured in Science in 2018. Reiser has been an advocate of science and innovation for two decades and was named as an inventor on multiple patents. He is co-founder of Cambridge, Massachusetts-based Walden Biosciences, an ARCH Venture Partners joint-venture biopharmaceutical portfolio company dedicated to develop first-in-class therapeutics for kidney diseases.

== Education ==
He grew up in Remchingen-Nöttingen in Germany. Reiser received his medical and Ph.D. degrees from Ruprecht-Karls-Universität Heidelberg in Heidelberg, Germany, in 1998 and 1999, respectively. His dissertation, summa cum laude, was entitled Pathobiologie der Podozyten: Molekulare Analyse der glomerulären Schlitzmembran und Fortsatzdynamik von Podozyten at the Institute for Anatomy and Cell Biology,

He worked as postdoctoral fellow in Molecular and Cellular Biology and Kidney Disease at Albert Einstein College of Medicine for a year. From 2000 to 2003, he trained in Internal Medicine at Albert Einstein College of Medicine. After his residency (medicine), he did fellowship training in Nephrology at Harvard Medical School-affiliated Massachusetts General Hospital (MGH) and Brigham and Women’s Hospital (BWH).

== Career ==
Reiser’s independent academic career started as an assistant professor at Harvard Medical School in 2005. In 2007, he founded and directed the MGH Program in Glomerular Disease, which runs the first of its kind at a Harvard University-affiliated hospital.

After three years on the faculty of Harvard Medical School, he joined the University of Miami Miller School of Medicine as a professor of anatomy and cell biology. He was also appointed as the Chief of Division of Nephrology and Hypertension and the Director of the Peggy and Harold Katz Family Drug Center Institute at the University of Miami.

In 2010, he was elected as the Vice Chair for Research by the Department of Medicine. In 2011, he took up the role of Endowed (Peggy and Harold Katz) Chair in Vascular Biology and Kidney Disease. In 2012, he was promoted to interim chairman of Medicine at the University of Miami Miller School of Medicine.

After having served in various capacities at the University of Miami, Reiser was appointed as The Ralph C Brown MD Professor and Chairman of Medicine by Rush University Medical Center in September 2012. Reiser’s academic career has centered on his role as Chairman of Medicine at Rush University and he has been a member of Medical Executive Committee (MEC) (2014–2016), Committee on Senior Faculty Appointments and Promotions (COSFAP) (2014, Chair 2015–2016), Committee on Student Evaluation and Promotion (COSEP) (2014–2016), Rush Medical College Faculty Council (FC) (2017-2020) and Conflict of Interest and Commitment Committee (COIIR) (2013-2023).

In May 2023, the University of Texas System Board of Regents appointed Reiser as President of the University of Texas Medical Branch in Galveston and CEO of the UTMB Health System.

== Scientific contribution ==
Reiser's research focuses on podocyte biology and glomerular diseases. His laboratory has been developing therapies and assays to combat renal diseases and its many complications since 2004.

His contributions range from identification of a common circulating blood protein —soluble urokinase plasminogen activator receptor (suPAR)— in the pathogenesis of focal segmental glomerulosclerosis (FSGS) to suPAR's emerging role as earliest known biomarker for incident and progressive chronic kidney disease (CKD) as well as for acute kidney injury (AKI). suPAR may link the innate immune system functionally to the kidney – a novel, potentially fundamental concept. "suPAR is a global risk factor for kidney diseases and lower levels of it are better for any of them. He also compares the characteristics of suPAR to that of cholesterol. suPAR targeting may do for kidney disease what statins has done for cardiovascular disease", he says. His work has been responsible for new research fields and is significantly sparking new therapeutic approaches for renal diseases.

Reiser has published more than 250 papers, which have received in excess of 28000 citations. He has been involved in editorial activities of various scientific journals including Journal of Clinical Investigation, Journal of the American Society of Nephrology (JASN), Kidney International, American Journal of Therapeutics, International Journal of Nephrology, and F1000Prime.

As a healthcare professional, Reiser attempts to engage others to work in a team-focused approach. He attempts to lead with transparency and accountability, and to apply a data-driven approach with the goal of successful navigation through a complex financial and academic environment in healthcare.

== Awards and honors ==
Reiser has been an active member of the following prestigious physician societies:

- 2009: American Society for Clinical Investigation (ASCI)
- 2012: American Clinical and Climatological Association (ACCA)
- 2015: Association of American Physicians (AAP)
- 2017: Academy of Sciences Leopoldina (The National Academy of Germany)

The significance of his work has been recognized by numerous distinctions and awards:

- 2005: Young Investigator Award, German Society of Nephrology
- 2007: Ajinomoto Scholar Award for Amino Acid Research, Ajinomoto
- 2012: Provost’s Award for Scholarly Activity, University of Miami
- 2016: Franz Volhard Award (the highest research award of the German Society of Nephrology)
- 2017: Research Faculty Award, Rush University Medical Center
- 2019: Hero of Medicine Award, Halo Science
- 2025: Marilyn G. Farquhar Lifetime Research Achievement Award, International Society of Glomerular Disease (ISGD)
- 2025: Fellow, National Academy of Inventors (NAI)

He was awarded visiting professorship or honored as keynote speaker by various universities and institutions including Weill Cornell Medicine (The Rogosin Institute Lecturer; 2013), University of California at Los Angeles (UCLA Kleeman Award, 2013), Peking University First Hospital (2013), University of Mississippi (2014), Brown University (2015), Harvard Medical School (2015), University of Michigan (2016), Johns Hopkins Hospital (2017), University of California San Francisco Medical Center (2017), Yale University (2018), Icahn School of Medicine at Mount Sinai (2019), University of Alabama (2020), Duke University (2021), National Institutes of Health (Invited National Speaker, 2022) and Baylor College of Medicine (Invited Speaker, William E. Mitch Lectureship Endowment, 2025).

== Board certification and licensure ==
- German Medical License – Approbation (Germany) (July, 2000)
- Diplomate of the American Board of Internal Medicine (ABIM) (October, 2003)
- Full Medical License – Commonwealth of Massachusetts (2005)
- United States Department of Justice (DOJ) Drug Enforcement Administration (DEA) License (2005)
- Florida Medical License Board Certification in Internal Medicine (December, 2008)
- Illinois Medical License (2013)
