= Intectin =

Protein found in mice

Identifiers
- Organism: Mus musculus (house mouse)
- Symbol: Ly6m
- Alt. symbols: 2010109I03Rik
- Entrez: 67038
- Orthologs: NCBI: entry; OMA: entry
- UniProt: F7B0C7

Other data
- Chromosome: 15: 74.75 - 74.75 Mb
Search for
- Structures: Swiss-model
- Domains: InterPro

Intectin, also called lymphocyte antigen 6 family member M, is a mouse protein encoded by the gene Ly6m. It is a Ly-6 family protein which is anchored to glycosylphosphatidylinositol on intestinal epithelial cells. Intectin has been shown to maintain the integrity of the intestinal wall by inducing apoptosis of intestinal epithelial cells upon exposure to dietary palmitic acid. Mice treated with the prebiotic oligofructose showed improved intestinal homeostasis as indicated by increased intectin.
