= Owen Witte =

American physician-scientist (born 1949)

- Born: May 17, 1949 (age 77); Brooklyn, New York, US
- Education: Cornell University (B.S.) Stanford University School of Medicine (M.D.)
- Scientific career
- Workplaces: Stanford University; MIT; University of California, Los Angeles; Howard Hughes Medical Institute
- Website: www.stemcell.ucla.edu/member/witte

Owen Witte (born May 17, 1949) is an American physician-scientist at the University of California, Los Angeles. He is a University Professor of microbiology, immunology and molecular genetics in the David Geffen School of Medicine at UCLA, founding director emeritus of the UCLA Eli and Edythe Broad Center of Regenerative Medicine and Stem Cell Research, and the UC Regents’ David Saxon Presidential Chair in developmental immunology (1989–present). Witte is also a Howard Hughes Medical Institute investigator (1986–2016) and a member of the President's Cancer Panel (2012 to 2016), the National Academy of Sciences, the National Academy of Medicine, the American Academy of Arts and Sciences, and the Cancer Research Academy of the AACR. He serves on numerous editorial boards and scientific advisory boards for academic centers and biotechnology companies.

In the last 50 years, Witte has contributed to understanding of human leukemias, immune disorders and epithelial cancers, which have defined new targets for attack that have influenced the development of new therapies that have changed medical practice and patient outcomes. His discovery of the tyrosine kinase activity in the ABL1 protein and the demonstration of the BCR-ABL oncoproteins in leukemias was one of the preclinical discoveries that led to the development of Gleevec, the first targeted therapy for chronic myelogenous leukemia.

Witte also co-discovered the gene for Bruton's tyrosine kinase, a protein essential for normal B-lymphocyte development that, when mutated, causes the onset of X-linked agammaglobulinemia. This finding stimulated the creation of new targeted therapies like Ibrutinib that have transformed treatment for CLL, B cell lymphomas, multiple myeloma and certain autoimmune diseases.

His current research focuses on characterizing the stem cells for epithelial cancers of the prostate and other organs in order to define new and more targeted therapies. Using tissue modeling techniques, Witte discovered the prostate stem cell antigen that is up-regulated in prostate cancer, identified the human prostate stem cell population and determined that the protein N-Myc, which is produced by the gene MYCN, leads to the development of aggressive neuroendocrine prostate cancer tumors. Recent striking observations using a human epithelial tissue recombination/transformation system have shown that prostate and other tissues can be driven to an adenocarcinoma state by defined oncogenic signaling, and further trans-differentiated by epigenetic control to highly aggressive small cell carcinoma with neuroendocrine features — defining new immune targets for therapy under active investigation.

== Education ==
Witte earned his B.S. degree in microbiology from Cornell University in 1971. He earned his M.D. degree from Stanford University in 1976, specializing in molecular virology, immunology and medicine.

He completed his predoctoral fellowship in the laboratory of Irving Weissman (Stanford University; 1971 to 1976) and his postdoctoral fellowship in the laboratory of Nobel laureate Dr. David Baltimore (MIT; 1976 to 1980).

== Awards ==
- 1990 Milken Family Medical Foundation Award in Basic Cancer Research
- 1991 Richard and Hinda Rosenthal Foundation Award of the American Association for Cancer Research
- 1993 William Dameshek Prize, American Society of Hematology
- 1996 Elected fellow of the American Academy of Arts and Sciences
- 1997 Elected member of the National Academy of Sciences
- 2000 Warren Alpert Foundation Prize
- 2003 Elected member of the Institute of Medicine
- 2003 Leukemia and Lymphoma Society's de Villiers International Achievement Award
- 2009 Cotlove Award, Academy of Clinical Laboratory Physicians & Scientists
- 2012-2017 Appointed member of the President's Cancer Panel
- 2014 Elected Fellow of the American Association for Cancer Research Academy
- 2014 The Rowley Prize awarded by the Intl Chronic Myeloid Leukemia Foundation
- 2015 American Association for Cancer Research G.H.A. Clowes Memorial Award
- 2016 University Professor by University of California Regents
- 2016 Association of American Medical Colleges Award for Distinguished Research in Biomedical Sciences
- 2016 Stanford Medical School Kornberg-Berg Lifetime Achievement Award in Biosciences
- 2022 I3T Excellence in Research Award from UCLA’s David Geffen School of Medicine - Immunology, Inflammation, Infection and Transplantation (I3T) Research Theme
- 2024 AACR Award for Outstanding Achievement in Blood Cancer Research
