= Acral keratoderma =

Acral keratoderma may refer to:

- mal de Meleda
- Striate palmoplantar keratoderma
