= PSCA =

PSCA may refer to:

- Pacific Spaceport Complex – Alaska
- PSCA (gene)
- Punjab Safe Cities Authority
- Punjab State Carrom Association
