= CD59 =

Mammalian protein found in humans

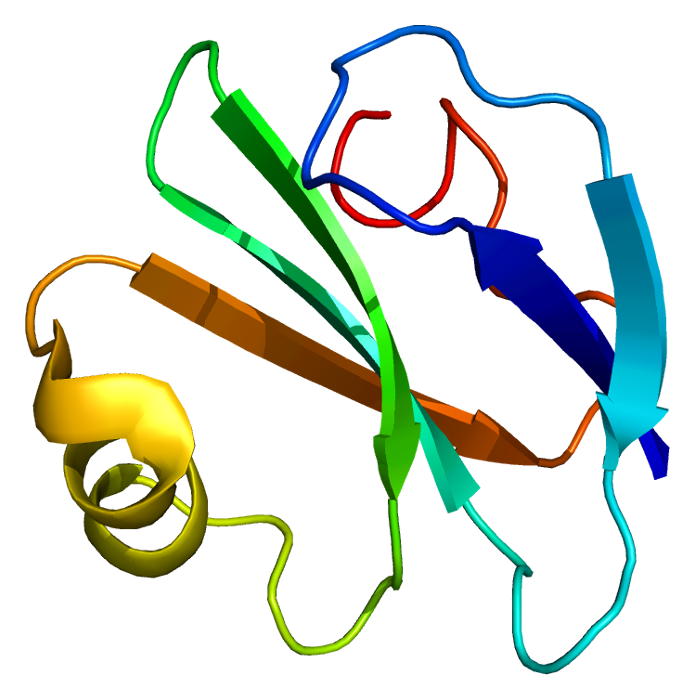

Identifiers
- Aliases: CD59, 16.3A5, 1F5, EJ16, EJ30, EL32, G344, HRF-20, HRF20, MAC-IP, MACIF, MEM43, MIC11, MIN1, MIN2, MIN3, MIRL, MSK21, p18-20, CD59 molecule, CD59 molecule (CD59 blood group)
- External IDs: OMIM: 107271; MGI: 1888996; GeneCards: CD59
Available structures
PDB	Ortholog search: PDBe RCSB
PDB	List of PDB id codes 1CDQ, 1CDR, 1CDS, 1ERG, 1ERH, 2J8B, 2OFS, 2UWR, 2UX2, 4BIK

Gene location (Human)
Chr.	Chromosome 11 (human)
Band	11p13	Start	33,703,010 bp
Band	11p13	End	33,736,479 bp

Gene location (Mouse)
Chr.	Chromosome 2 (mouse)
Band	2|2 E2	Start	103,900,194 bp
Band	2|2 E2	End	103,921,532 bp
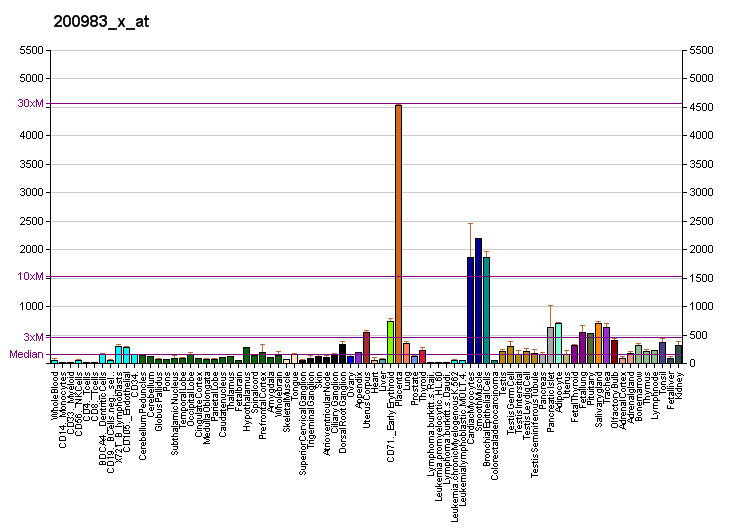

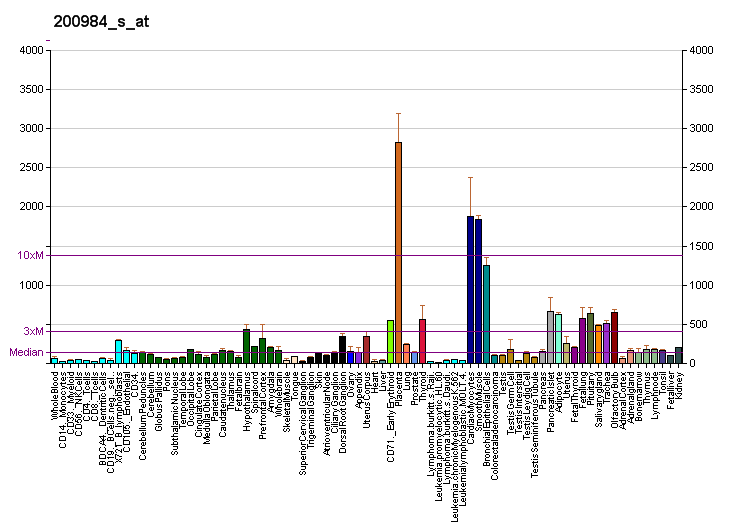

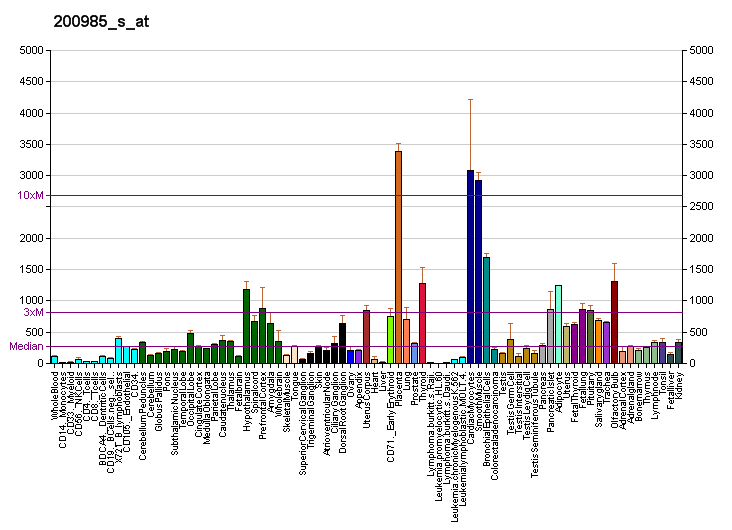
RNA expression pattern
Bgee	Human / Mouse (ortholog); Top expressed in: stromal cell of endometrium; bronchial epithelial cell; right lung; olfactory zone of nasal mucosa; gallbladder; upper lobe of left lung; minor salivary glands; tibial nerve; smooth muscle tissue; spinal ganglia / Top expressed in: brown adipose tissue; spermatid; choroid plexus; bone marrow; choroid plexus of fourth ventricle; right kidney; epiblast; morula; quadriceps femoris muscle; liver; More reference expression data
BioGPS	More reference expression data
Gene ontology
Molecular function	protein binding; complement binding
Cellular component	vesicle; endoplasmic reticulum membrane; membrane; focal adhesion; Golgi membrane; plasma membrane; extracellular region; cell surface; compact myelin; anchored component of external side of plasma membrane; ER to Golgi transport vesicle membrane; anchored component of membrane; sarcolemma; extracellular exosome; endoplasmic reticulum-Golgi intermediate compartment membrane; extracellular space; specific granule membrane; tertiary granule membrane; transport vesicle
Biological process	blood coagulation; negative regulation of apoptotic process; negative regulation of activation of membrane attack complex; endoplasmic reticulum to Golgi vesicle-mediated transport; cell surface receptor signaling pathway; COPII vesicle coating; positive regulation of T cell proliferation; regulation of complement activation; cell activation; neutrophil degranulation; regulation of complement-dependent cytotoxicity
Sources:Amigo / QuickGO
Orthologs
Databases	NCBI: entry; OMA: entry
Species	Human	Mouse
Entrez	966	333883
Ensembl	ENSG00000085063	ENSMUSG00000068686
UniProt	P13987; Q6FHM9	P58019
RefSeq (mRNA)	NM_203331; NM_000611; NM_001127223; NM_001127225; NM_001127226 NM_001127227; NM_203329; NM_203330	NM_181858; NM_001368215
RefSeq (protein)	NP_000602; NP_001120695; NP_001120697; NP_001120698; NP_001120699 NP_976074; NP_976075; NP_976076; NP_000602.1; NP_001120695.1; NP_001120697.1; NP_001120698.1; NP_001120699.1; NP_976074.1; NP_976075.1; NP_976076.1	NP_862906; NP_001355144
Location (UCSC)	Chr 11: 33.7 – 33.74 Mb	Chr 2: 103.9 – 103.92 Mb
PubMed search
- Wikidata
View/Edit Human	View/Edit Mouse

CD59 glycoprotein, also known as MAC-inhibitory protein (MAC-IP), membrane inhibitor of reactive lysis (MIRL), or protectin, is a protein that in humans is encoded by the CD59 gene. It is an LU domain and belongs to the LY6/uPAR/alpha-neurotoxin protein family.

CD59 attaches to host cells via a glycophosphatidylinositol (GPI) anchor. Cholesterol-containing microdomains aid in CD59 activity by stimulating a "pinch point" in the lipid membrane during MAC assembly to prevent pore-formation and inhibit lysing. When complement activation leads to deposition of C5b678 on host cells, CD59 can prevent C9 from polymerizing and forming the complement membrane attack complex. It may also signal the cell to perform active measures such as endocytosis of the CD59-C9 complex. Endocytosis of this complex leads to the destruction of the ion channel formation that this complex provides to the MAC. These ion channels are used for transfer of different ions to maintain the correct concentration of minerals inside and outside of the membrane, and without this correct maintenance, severe symptoms and diseases can occur such as neuron degeneration and Alzheimer's disease.

Mutations affecting GPI that reduce expression of CD59 and decay-accelerating factor on red blood cells result in paroxysmal nocturnal hemoglobinuria. GPI mutation and consequent reduction in CD59 expression results from a cysteine to tyrosine missense mutation, which prevents disulfide bridge formation, ultimately disrupting tertiary protein structure and preventing proper GPI-CD59 complex binding.

Viruses such as HIV, human cytomegalovirus and vaccinia incorporate host cell CD59 into their own viral envelope to prevent lysis by complement. Additionally, CD59 has been investigated as a target for immunotherapy when treating certain cancers such as breast cancer. Researchers have found that once CD59 had been targeted, there is an upregulation in fas and caspase-3, creating an increase in apoptosis and tumor growth suppression in MCF-7 cells.
