= LYPD6B =

Protein-coding gene in the species Homo sapiens

Identifiers
- Aliases: LYPD6B, CT116, LYPD7, LY6/PLAUR domain containing 6B
- External IDs: MGI: 1919147; GeneCards: LYPD6B

Gene location (Human)
Chr.	Chromosome 2 (human)
Band	2q23.2	Start	149,038,107 bp
Band	2q23.2	End	149,215,262 bp

Gene location (Mouse)
Chr.	Chromosome 2 (mouse)
Band	2|2 C1.1	Start	49,677,700 bp
Band	2|2 C1.1	End	49,838,861 bp
RNA expression pattern
Bgee	Human / Mouse (ortholog); Top expressed in: skin of abdomen; right uterine tube; skin of leg; gallbladder; nasal epithelium; right testis; left testis; olfactory zone of nasal mucosa; palpebral conjunctiva; mucosa of paranasal sinus / Top expressed in: medullary collecting duct; epithelium of stomach; molar; skin of abdomen; hair follicle; anterior horn of spinal cord; otolith organ; utricle; lumbar subsegment of spinal cord; urothelium; More reference expression data
BioGPS	n/a
Gene ontology
Molecular function	acetylcholine receptor regulator activity
Cellular component	membrane; anchored component of membrane; extracellular region; plasma membrane
Biological process	regulation of neurotransmitter receptor activity
Sources:Amigo / QuickGO
Orthologs
Databases	NCBI: entry; OMA: entry
Species	Human	Mouse
Entrez	130576	71897
Ensembl	ENSG00000150556	ENSMUSG00000026765
UniProt	Q8NI32	Q9D7F2
RefSeq (mRNA)	NM_177964; NM_001317002; NM_001317003; NM_001317004; NM_001317005 NM_001317006	NM_027990; NM_001379381; NM_001379382; NM_001379383; NM_001379384 NM_001379385; NM_001379386; NM_001379387
RefSeq (protein)	NP_001303931; NP_001303932; NP_001303933; NP_001303934; NP_001303935 NP_808879	NP_082266; NP_001366310; NP_001366311; NP_001366312; NP_001366313 NP_001366314; NP_001366315; NP_001366316
Location (UCSC)	Chr 2: 149.04 – 149.22 Mb	Chr 2: 49.68 – 49.84 Mb
PubMed search
- Wikidata
View/Edit Human	View/Edit Mouse

LY6/PLAUR Domain Containing 6B, also known under the name Cancer/Testis Antigen 116 (CTA116) and LYPD7 is encoded by the LYPD6B gene. LYPD6B is a member of the lymphocyte antigen 6 (LY6) protein family. It is expressed in the testis, lungs, stomach, prostate and in the nervous system where it acts as a modulator of nicotinic acetylcholine receptor (nAChRs) activity.

== Gene ==
The gene LYPD6B encoding the protein is located on chromosome 2 in humans.

== Structure ==
The protein is 183 amino acids long and its molecular mass is 20.656.

As a member of the Ly-6/uPAR family, the protein contains a disulfide β-structural core and three protruding loops.

LYPD6B is known as a prototoxin due to its structural similarity with the 3-fingered snake venom proteins α-bungarotoxin and cobratoxin. As a prototoxin, LYPD6B also belongs to the protein family of Ly-6/urokinase plasminogen activator receptor (Ly6/uPAR). It has a 3-fingered motif secondary structure which appears due to the presence of 8–10 cysteine residues that facilitate disulfide bond formation.

== Clinical significance ==
The protein is expressed in the nervous system where it acts as an enhancer of the activity of the neurotransmitter acetylcholine certain α7-containing nicotinic acetylcholine receptors, which have a role in learning. A duplication of the gene has been detected in a case study of two individuals with severe intellectual disability, suggesting its role in proper brain development and cognitive function. Additionally, the protein demonstrates high expression in several other normal organs including the testis, lungs, stomach, and prostate.

Hypermethylation of the gene and a subsequent decreased expression has been demonstrated as one of the contributors to the invasive capacity of cancer cells in melanoma.

The protein LYPD6 also leads to an increase in Wnt/β-catenin signaling.

== History ==
The protein was described for the first time in 2009. Its presence was detected in the cytoplasm and it was associated with activation of the AP-1 transcription factor.
