= LYPD1 =

Protein-coding gene in the species Homo sapiens

Identifiers
- Aliases: LYPD1, LYPDC1, PHTS, LY6/PLAUR domain containing 1
- External IDs: OMIM: 610450; MGI: 1919835; GeneCards: LYPD1

Gene location (Human)
Chr.	Chromosome 2 (human)
Band	2q21.2	Start	132,643,286 bp
Band	2q21.2	End	132,671,579 bp

Gene location (Mouse)
Chr.	Chromosome 1 (mouse)
Band	1|1 E3	Start	125,795,359 bp
Band	1|1 E3	End	125,840,838 bp
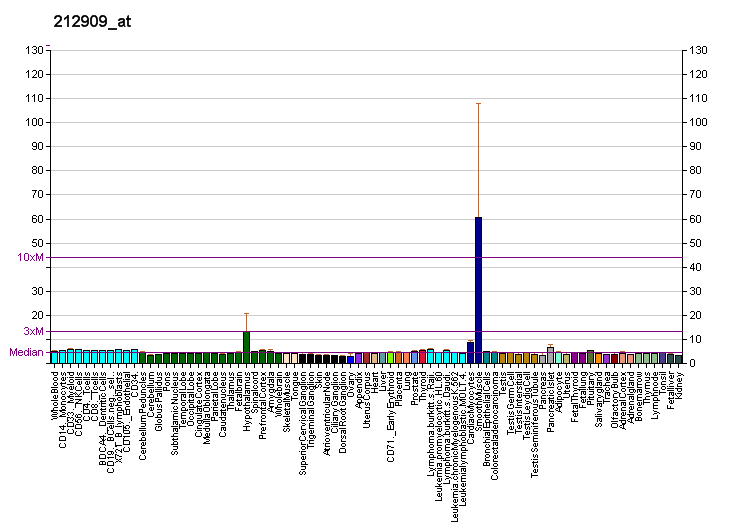
RNA expression pattern
Bgee	Human / Mouse (ortholog); Top expressed in: right uterine tube; nucleus accumbens; caudate nucleus; putamen; ventricular zone; hypothalamus; amygdala; pituitary gland; cingulate gyrus; anterior cingulate cortex / Top expressed in: glossopharyngeal ganglion; ganglion of vagus nerve; dentate gyrus of hippocampal formation granule cell; cuneiform bones; cranial nervi; inferior ganglion of vagus nerve; amygdala; olfactory nerve; primary visual cortex; superior frontal gyrus; More reference expression data
BioGPS	More reference expression data
Gene ontology
Molecular function	acetylcholine receptor binding; acetylcholine receptor inhibitor activity
Cellular component	membrane; anchored component of membrane; extracellular region; plasma membrane
Biological process	response to nicotine; behavioral fear response; negative regulation of signaling receptor activity; synaptic transmission, cholinergic; cell activation; acetylcholine receptor signaling pathway; negative regulation of protein localization to plasma membrane
Sources:Amigo / QuickGO
Orthologs
Databases	NCBI: entry; OMA: entry
Species	Human	Mouse
Entrez	116372	72585
Ensembl	ENSG00000150551	ENSMUSG00000026344
UniProt	Q8N2G4	Q8BLC3
RefSeq (mRNA)	NM_001077427; NM_144586; NM_001321234; NM_001321235	NM_145100; NM_001311089; NM_001311090
RefSeq (protein)	NP_001070895; NP_001308163; NP_001308164; NP_653187	NP_001298018; NP_001298019; NP_659568
Location (UCSC)	Chr 2: 132.64 – 132.67 Mb	Chr 1: 125.8 – 125.84 Mb
PubMed search
- Wikidata
View/Edit Human	View/Edit Mouse

Ly6/PLAUR domain-containing protein 1 is a protein that in humans is encoded by the LYPD1 gene.

This protein is also known as Lynx2, a member of the Lynx family of neurotransmitter receptor-binding proteins. Transgenic mice without Lynx2 expression have increased anxiety-related behaviors.
