= Meleda disease =

- Other names: Keratosis palmoplantaris transgrediens of Siemens
- Meleda disease has an autosomal recessive pattern of inheritance.
- Specialty: Medical genetics
- Symptoms: Dry, thick patches of skin
- Causes: Hereditary; autosomal recessive trait

Meleda disease (MDM) or "mal de Meleda", also called Mljet disease, keratosis palmoplantaris and transgradiens of Siemens, (also known as "acral keratoderma", "mutilating palmoplantar keratoderma of the Gamborg-Nielsen type", "palmoplantar ectodermal dysplasia type VIII", and "palmoplantar keratoderma of the Norrbotten type") is an extremely rare autosomal recessive congenital skin disorder in which dry, thick patches of skin develop on the soles of the hands and feet, a condition known as palmoplantar hyperkeratosis. Meleda Disease is a skin condition which usually can be identified not long after birth. This is a genetic condition but it is very rare. The hands and feet usually are the first to show signs of the disease but the disease can advance to other parts of the body. Signs of the disease include thickening of the skin, on hands and soles of feet, which can turn red in color. There currently is no cure and treatment is limited, but Acitretin can be used in severe cases.

== Signs and symptoms ==
Skin on the palms of hands and soles of feet have dry, thick patches which progress slowly. The skin that is affected may look red in color and then start becoming abnormally thick and scaly. After birth it usually is obvious whether a child is affected with this disease because the hands or feet will appear to be peeling and could be red in color.

There is not much variation in this disease besides the skin how red the skin will turn and how much skin will turn thicker. The skin that is affected on the hands and feet can start to look like the affected person is wearing gloves or socks, this is because the affected area on the hands and feet go up to the wrists and ankles, respectively.

Other symptoms can include excessive sweating due to the thick skin affecting sweat glands on the skin; this excessive sweating can cause a person to have bad odor. Severity of symptoms could increase as a person gets older.

=== Signs ===
- dry skin on hands or feet
- skin peeling
- thick patches of skin
- skin discoloration (red skin)

== Cause ==
This is a skin disorder that is rare and inherited. It caused by genetics and is an autosomal recessive trait therefore, in order to be affected and present the disease each parent must be a carrier of the mutated allele and pass it to their kids. Inbreeding within families can cause Meleda disease to be prevalent. Meleda disease can be associated with other skin conditions such as skin discoloration, skin thickness, and skin peeling.

== Pathophysiology ==
Meleda disease is a genetic disease but since it is a rare disease the chances of inheriting the disease are not high. Since this is an autosomal recessive disease, two copies of the gene that contain the mutation must be present for one to show signs and symptoms of the disease. In order for one to be affected with the disease, both parents must contain the affected gene and pass it to their child. Even if a person is not affected by the disease, it is possible for them to be heterozygous, and still carry the affected gene and be able to pass it to their children; there would be a 25% chance that the child would actually be affected if both parents were carriers of the disease but did not actually display symptoms of the disease.

=== Genetic ===
MDM is most common on the Dalmatian island of Mljet (Italian: Meleda), thought to be because of a founder effect. It is of autosomal recessive inheritance. It may be caused by a mutation on the SLURP1 gene, located on chromosome 8. The SLURP1 gene makes a protein called SLURP-1, and this protein is located in cell (biology)s of the skin. The protein SLURP-1 helps with cell death regulation and help mediate inflammation that is occurring, this protein is important in keeping the skin cells at a level of homeostasis. A gene mutation would be caused by the chromosome 8qter, which codes for the SLURP1 gene, to be cut, thus causing a mutation in that gene, which would disrupt the way it controls the skin cells.

== Diagnosis ==
The skin abnormalities can be found on a child at birth or during infancy. The abnormalities on the soles of feet or on the palms of hands can be found by the physician during a full examination. Family medical history can help with diagnosing because this is a genetically inherited disease. Overall, the diagnosis usually happens after birth because the majority of the time the child's hands and feet will be affected, making the condition apparent. Genetic testing can be done to determine whether there are mutations to confirm the disease. There are similar diseases that affect the skin which also have to be taken into consideration before making a diagnosis.

=== Palmoplantar keratodermas (PPK) ===
These are different patterns of disorders that cause the thickening of the skin on the hands and feet:

- Diffuse PPK: Symmetric pattern
- Focal PPK: Compact masses
- Punctate PPK: Distribution of many keratoses

=== Differential Diagnosis ===
- ichthyosis
- psoriasis
- lichen planus
- mycosis fungoides

== Treatment ==
Treatment can consist of topical lotions, drug therapies, and surgery. Treatment varies from person to person depending on the severity of their symptoms. Treatment has been more successful with oral retinoids than with the use of topical lotions, applied directly to the affected skin.

=== Retinoids ===
Aromatic Retinoid Etretinate used to be prescribed and had effective results in treating Meleda disease, but was taken off of the market in 1998 in America due to toxic effects and the increased risk of birth defects. Aromatic Retinoid Etretinate is still sold in Japan under the name Tigason. In America, Etretinate was replaced by Acitretin, and is only used in severe cases due to the severe side effects. If taking Acitretin it is advised to not donate blood or get pregnant for at least 3 years after taking the drug.

==== Topical Lotion ====
Topical lotions can help keep the skin moisturized, and help reduce flaking of the skin. Generally these are safe to put on skin, but possible side effects can include irritation.

- Keratolytics, such as salicylic acid

== Prognosis ==
With treatment the prognosis can be good for people with this disease. Quality of life can be decreased, therefore getting treatment is recommended. Too much dry skin can be painful for some and cause discomfort. There is limited data on the life expectancy of an affected person, but this disease alone does not reduce a person's lifespan.

== Epidemiology ==
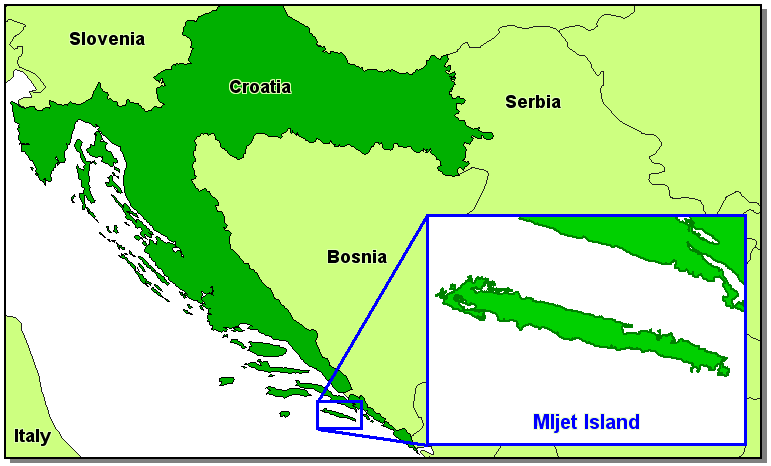
Mljet Island located off of Croatia

Most cases of Meleda disease have been reported in and around the former Yugoslavia. It is estimated that there is one case per 100,000 people, who become affected with the disease. Symptoms usually show up after birth and there are no differences in gender or ethnicity as to who can become affected.

The disease is believed to have started on the Croatian island of Mljet, after people were quarantined on the island for having plague and other diseases in 1826. On the island, inbreeding is believed to have occurred and Meleda disease became apparent.

== Research Directions ==
Current research is directed to find more treatments, and to see if there is any way to prevent this disease.

== See also ==
- Palmoplantar keratoderma
- List of cutaneous conditions
