= Skin discoloration =

Medical symptom

Skin discoloration can be a side effect of certain medical therapies, for instance minocycline treatment and radiotherapy.

== See also ==
- Argyria
