= Urokinase receptor =

Mammalian protein found in Homo sapiens

PLAUR
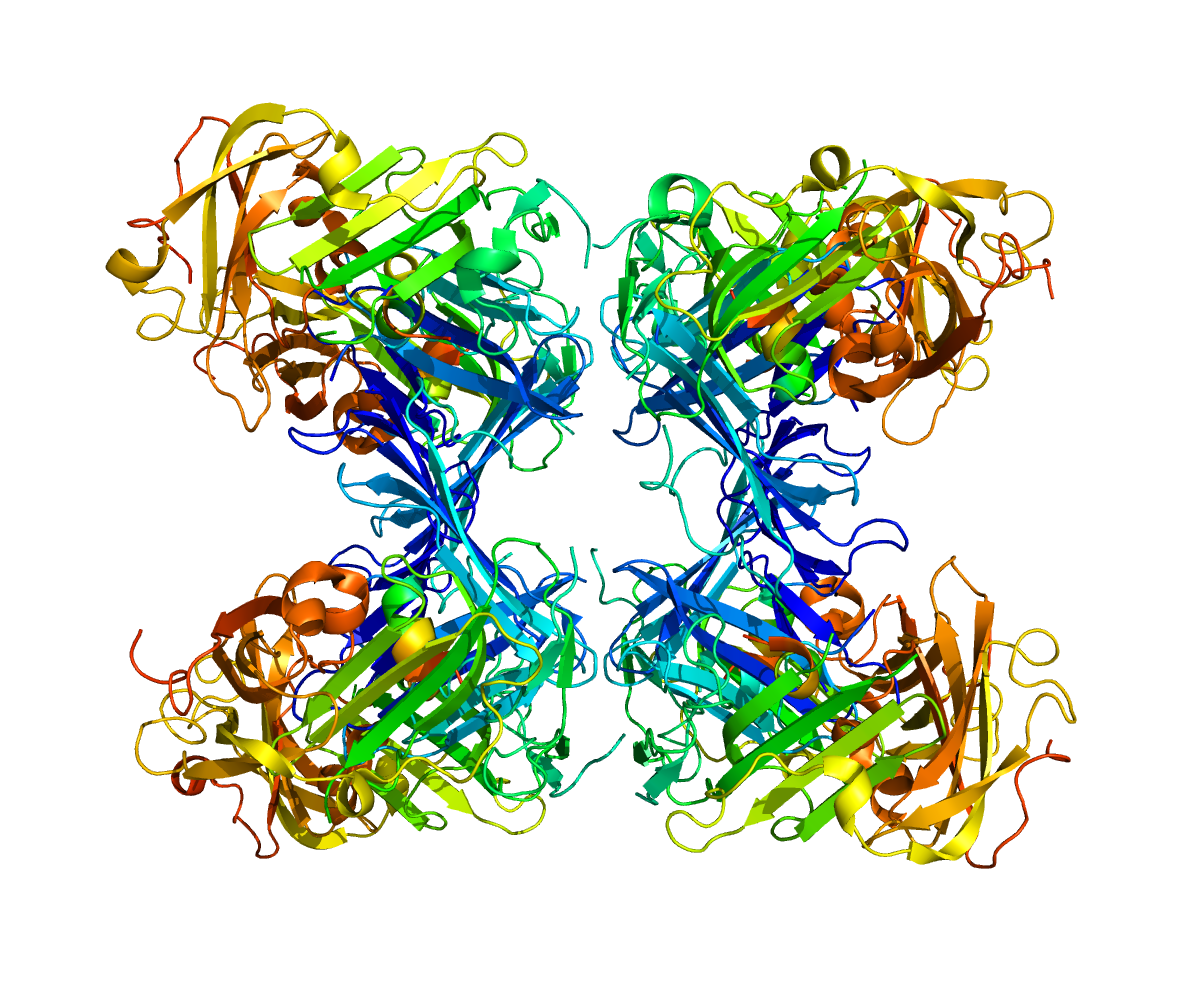

Identifiers
- Aliases: PLAUR, CD87, U-PAR, UPAR, URKR, plasminogen activator, urokinase receptor
- External IDs: OMIM: 173391; MGI: 97612; GeneCards: PLAUR
Available structures
PDB	Ortholog search: PDBe RCSB
PDB	List of PDB id codes 1YWH, 2FD6, 3BT1, 3BT2, 3U73, 3U74, 2I9B, 4K24, 4QTI

Gene location (Human)
Chr.	Chromosome 19 (human)
Band	19q13.31	Start	43,646,095 bp
Band	19q13.31	End	43,670,547 bp

Gene location (Mouse)
Chr.	Chromosome 7 (mouse)
Band	7|7 A3	Start	24,161,909 bp
Band	7|7 A3	End	24,175,393 bp
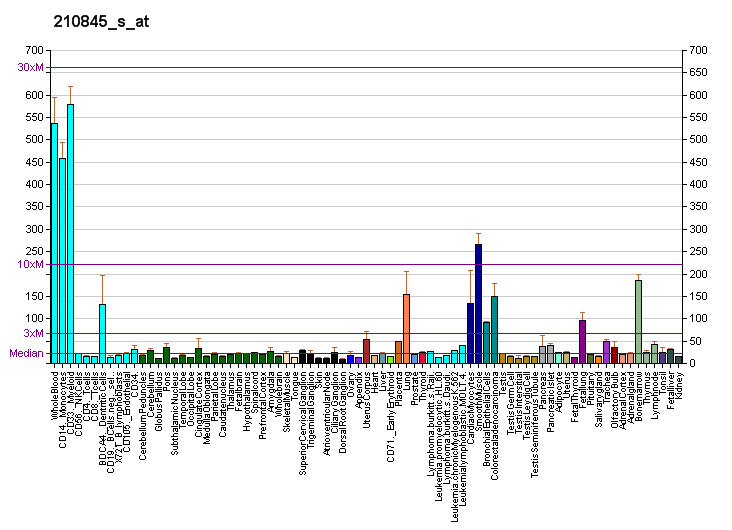

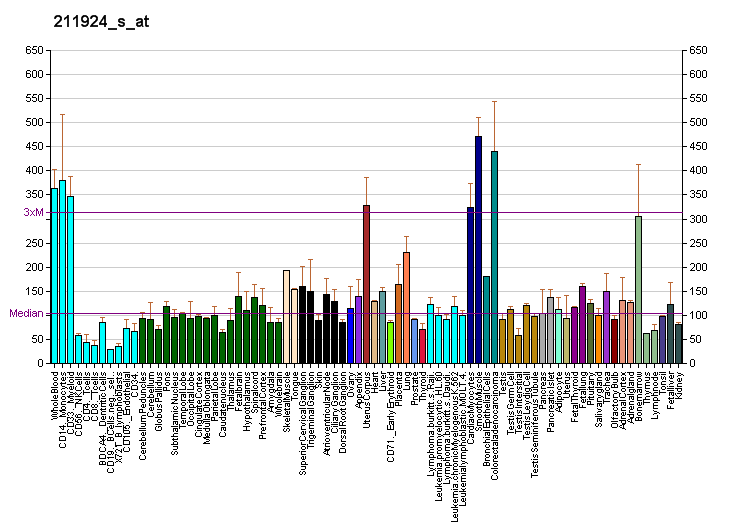

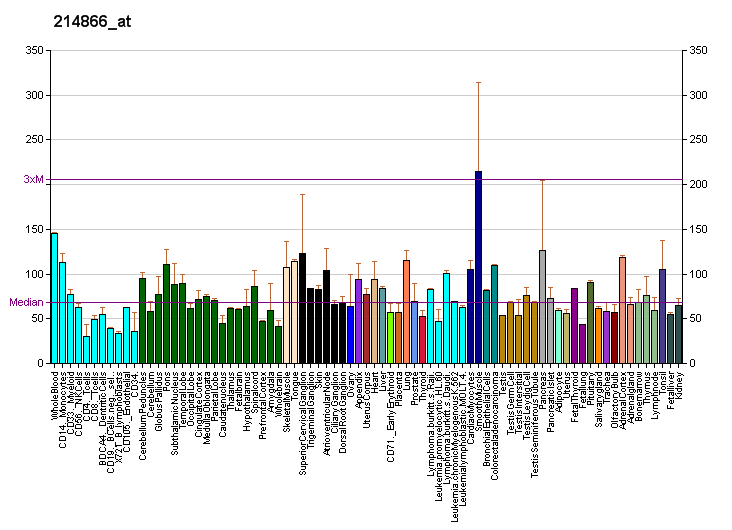
RNA expression pattern
Bgee	Human / Mouse (ortholog); Top expressed in: periodontal fiber; monocyte; stromal cell of endometrium; vena cava; gallbladder; blood; bone marrow cell; cartilage tissue; granulocyte; right lung / Top expressed in: granulocyte; decidua; endothelial cell of lymphatic vessel; tibiofemoral joint; right lung lobe; bone marrow; calvaria; stroma of bone marrow; mucous cell of stomach; spleen; More reference expression data
BioGPS	More reference expression data
Gene ontology
Molecular function	protein domain specific binding; protein binding; urokinase plasminogen activator receptor activity; enzyme binding; signaling receptor binding; signaling receptor activity
Cellular component	integral component of membrane; cell projection; endoplasmic reticulum lumen; endoplasmic reticulum membrane; membrane; focal adhesion; integral component of plasma membrane; extracellular region; cell junction; anchored component of membrane; extracellular exosome; extrinsic component of membrane; plasma membrane; specific granule membrane; cell surface
Biological process	positive regulation of protein phosphorylation; negative regulation of cysteine-type endopeptidase activity involved in apoptotic signaling pathway; fibrinolysis; negative regulation of intrinsic apoptotic signaling pathway; urokinase plasminogen activator signaling pathway; negative regulation of apoptotic process; blood coagulation; attachment of GPI anchor to protein; chemotaxis; positive regulation of release of cytochrome c from mitochondria; positive regulation of DNA binding; positive regulation of epidermal growth factor receptor signaling pathway; regulation of proteolysis; signal transduction; neutrophil degranulation
Sources:Amigo / QuickGO
Orthologs
Databases	NCBI: entry; OMA: entry
Species	Human	Mouse
Entrez	5329	18793
Ensembl	ENSG00000011422	ENSMUSG00000046223
UniProt	Q03405	P35456
RefSeq (mRNA)	NM_001005376; NM_001005377; NM_001301037; NM_002659	NM_011113
RefSeq (protein)	NP_001005376; NP_001005377; NP_001287966; NP_002650	NP_035243
Location (UCSC)	Chr 19: 43.65 – 43.67 Mb	Chr 7: 24.16 – 24.18 Mb
PubMed search
- Wikidata
View/Edit Human	View/Edit Mouse

The Urokinase receptor, also known as urokinase plasminogen activator surface receptor (uPAR) or CD87 (Cluster of Differentiation 87), is a protein encoded in humans by the PLAUR gene. It is a multidomain glycoprotein tethered to the cell membrane with a glycosylphosphotidylinositol (GPI) anchor. uPAR was originally identified as a saturable binding site for urokinase (also known as uPA) on the cell surface.

== Structure ==
uPAR consists of three tandem LU domains, which are protein domains of the three-finger protein family. The structure of uPAR has been solved by X-ray crystallography in complex with a peptide antagonist and with its native ligand, urokinase. All three three-finger domains are necessary for high affinity binding of the primary ligand, urokinase. In addition, uPAR also interacts with several other proteins, including vitronectin, the uPAR associated protein (uPARAP) and the integrin family of membrane proteins.

It has been possible to express uPAR recombinantly in CHO-cells and S2 cells from Drosophila melanogaster. 4 out of 5 of the possible glycosylation sites are used in vivo giving the protein a molecular weight of 50–60 kDA.

== Function ==
uPAR is a part of the plasminogen activation system, which in the healthy body is involved in tissue reorganization events such as mammary gland involution and wound healing. In order to be able to reorganize tissue, the old tissue must be able to be degraded. An important mechanism in this degradation is the proteolysis cascade initiated by the plasminogen activation system. uPAR binds urokinase and thus restricts plasminogen activation to the immediate vicinity of the cell membrane. When urokinase is bound to the receptor, there is cleavage between the GPI-anchor and the uPAR, releasing a soluble form of the protein known as suPAR.

== Clinical significance ==
Soluble urokinase plasminogen activator receptor (suPAR) has been found to be a biomarker of inflammation. Elevated suPAR is seen in chronic obstructive pulmonary disease, asthma, liver failure, heart failure, cardiovascular disease, and rheumatoid arthritis. Smokers have significantly higher suPAR compared to non-smokers.

Urokinase receptors have been found to be highly expressed on senescent cells, leading researchers to use chimeric antigen receptor T cells to eliminate senescent cells in mice.

The components of the plasminogen activation system have been found to be highly expressed in many malignant tumors, indicating that tumors are able to hijack the system, and use it in metastasis. Thus inhibitors of the various components of the plasminogen activation system have been sought as possible anticancer drugs.

uPAR has been involved in various other non-proteolytic processes related to cancer, such as cell migration, cell cycle regulation, and cell adhesion.

== Interactions ==
Urokinase receptor has been shown to interact with LRP1.

== See also ==
- Cancer
- Cluster of differentiation
- Metastasis
- Plasmin
- suPAR
- Urokinase
