= CD177 =

Protein-coding gene in humans

Identifiers
- Aliases: CD177, HNA-2a, HNA2A, NB1, NB1 GP, PRV-1, PRV1, CD177 molecule
- External IDs: OMIM: 162860; MGI: 1916141; GeneCards: CD177

Gene location (Human)
Chr.	Chromosome 19 (human)
Band	19q13.31	Start	43,353,686 bp
Band	19q13.31	End	43,363,172 bp

Gene location (Mouse)
Chr.	Chromosome 7 (mouse)
Band	7|7 A3	Start	24,443,408 bp
Band	7|7 A3	End	24,459,736 bp
RNA expression pattern
Bgee	Human / Mouse (ortholog); Top expressed in: rectum; mucosa of colon; mucosa of sigmoid colon; mucosa of transverse colon; bone marrow; bone marrow cell; spleen; trabecular bone; prostate; blood / Top expressed in: granulocyte; tibiofemoral joint; primary oocyte; secondary oocyte; zygote; large intestine; colon; left colon; bone marrow; trachea; More reference expression data
BioGPS	n/a
Gene ontology
Molecular function	protein binding; protease binding; integrin binding; calcium-dependent protein binding
Cellular component	anchored component of membrane; extracellular exosome; membrane; specific granule membrane; plasma membrane; secretory granule membrane; plasma membrane raft; tertiary granule membrane; extracellular region; lamellipodium; cell projection; membrane raft
Biological process	blood coagulation; leukocyte migration; neutrophil degranulation; cell adhesion; leukocyte cell-cell adhesion; regulation of endocytosis; positive regulation of superoxide anion generation; protein localization to cell surface; positive regulation of neutrophil degranulation; cell-cell junction maintenance; neutrophil extravasation; cell-cell adhesion via plasma-membrane adhesion molecules; neutrophil migration; regulation of integrin-mediated signaling pathway; immune system process; innate immune response
Sources:Amigo / QuickGO
Orthologs
Databases	NCBI: entry; OMA: entry
Species	Human	Mouse
Entrez	57126	68891
Ensembl	ENSG00000204936	ENSMUSG00000052212
UniProt	Q8N6Q3	Q8R2S8
RefSeq (mRNA)	NM_020406	NM_026862
RefSeq (protein)	NP_065139	NP_081138
Location (UCSC)	Chr 19: 43.35 – 43.36 Mb	Chr 7: 24.44 – 24.46 Mb
PubMed search
- Wikidata
View/Edit Human	View/Edit Mouse

CD177 antigen is a protein that in humans is encoded by the CD177 gene.

NB1, a glycosyl-phosphatidylinositol (GPI)-linked N-glycosylated cell surface glycoprotein, was first described in a case of neonatal alloimmune neutropenia (Lalezari et al., 1971). [supplied by OMIM]

== See also ==
- Cluster of differentiation
