= LYPD8 =

Protein-coding gene in humans

Identifiers
- Aliases: LYPD8, LY6/PLAUR domain containing 8
- External IDs: OMIM: 617067; MGI: 1917413; GeneCards: LYPD8

Gene location (Human)
Chr.	Chromosome 1 (human)
Band	1q44	Start	248,739,415 bp
Band	1q44	End	248,755,759 bp

Gene location (Mouse)
Chr.	Chromosome 11 (mouse)
Band	11|11 B1.3	Start	58,269,869 bp
Band	11|11 B1.3	End	58,281,554 bp
RNA expression pattern
Bgee	Human / Mouse (ortholog); Top expressed in: rectum; mucosa of colon; mucosa of transverse colon; mucosa of sigmoid colon; mucosa of ileum; Brodmann area 46; appendix; jejunal mucosa; prefrontal cortex; dorsolateral prefrontal cortex / Top expressed in: left colon; mucous cell of stomach; ileum; epithelium of stomach; pyloric antrum; duodenum; crypt of lieberkuhn of small intestine; epithelium of small intestine; migratory enteric neural crest cell; intestinal villus; More reference expression data
BioGPS	n/a
Orthologs
Databases	NCBI: entry; OMA: entry
Species	Human	Mouse
Entrez	646627	70163
Ensembl	ENSG00000259823	ENSMUSG00000013643
UniProt	Q6UX82	Q9D7S0
RefSeq (mRNA)	NM_001085474; NM_001291283	NM_001083884; NM_027339; NM_001330197
RefSeq (protein)	NP_001078943; NP_001278212	NP_001077353; NP_001317126; NP_081615
Location (UCSC)	Chr 1: 248.74 – 248.76 Mb	Chr 11: 58.27 – 58.28 Mb
PubMed search
- Wikidata
View/Edit Human	View/Edit Mouse

LY6/PLAUR domain containing 8 is a protein that in humans is encoded by the LYPD8 gene.
