= LYNX1 =

Protein-coding gene in the species Homo sapiens

Identifiers
- Aliases: LYNX1, SLURP2, Ly6/neurotoxin 1
- External IDs: OMIM: 606110; MGI: 1345180; GeneCards: LYNX1
Available structures
| PDB | Ortholog search: PDBe RCSB |
| PDB | List of PDB id codes 2L03 |

Gene location (Human)
| Chr. | Chromosome 8 (human) |
| Band | 8q24.3 | Start | 142,771,197 bp |
| Band | 8q24.3 | End | 142,777,810 bp |

Gene location (Mouse)
| Chr. | Chromosome 15 (mouse) |
| Band | 15|15 D3 | Start | 74,619,701 bp |
| Band | 15|15 D3 | End | 74,624,895 bp |
RNA expression pattern
| Bgee | Human / Mouse (ortholog); Top expressed in: apex of heart; right frontal lobe; prefrontal cortex; Brodmann area 9; cingulate gyrus; anterior cingulate cortex; lateral nuclear group of thalamus; left ventricle; right hemisphere of cerebellum; amygdala / Top expressed in: interventricular septum; dentate gyrus of hippocampal formation granule cell; pontine nuclei; visual cortex; primary visual cortex; superior frontal gyrus; lateral geniculate nucleus; cerebellar cortex; medial geniculate nucleus; medial vestibular nucleus; More reference expression data |
| BioGPS | n/a |
Gene ontology
| Molecular function | acetylcholine receptor inhibitor activity; ion channel inhibitor activity; acetylcholine receptor regulator activity; acetylcholine receptor binding |
| Cellular component | extracellular region; anchored component of membrane; plasma membrane; dendrite; cell projection; extracellular exosome; membrane; extracellular space; endoplasmic reticulum |
| Biological process | negative regulation of signaling receptor activity; synaptic transmission, cholinergic; regulation of molecular function; acetylcholine receptor signaling pathway; regulation of neurotransmitter receptor activity |
Sources:Amigo / QuickGO
Orthologs
| Databases | NCBI: entry; OMA: entry |
| Species | Human | Mouse |
| Entrez | 66004 | 23936 |
| Ensembl | ENSG00000180155 | ENSMUSG00000022594 |
| UniProt | P0DP57; P0DP58 | P0DP60 |
| RefSeq (mRNA) | NM_177457; NM_177476; NM_177477; NM_001356370 | NM_011838 |
| RefSeq (protein) | NP_803253; NP_001343301; NP_076435; NP_001343299; NP_803252 NP_803429; NP_803430 | NP_035968 |
| Location (UCSC) | Chr 8: 142.77 – 142.78 Mb | Chr 15: 74.62 – 74.62 Mb |
| PubMed search |
- Wikidata
| View/Edit Human | View/Edit Mouse |

Ly6/neurotoxin 1 is a protein in humans that is encoded by the LYNX1 gene. Alternatively spliced variants encoding different isoforms have been identified.

== Function ==
This gene encodes a member of the Ly-6/neurotoxin gene family, a group of lymphocyte antigens that attach to the cell surface by a glycosylphosphatidylinositol anchor and have a unique structure showing conserved 8-10 cysteine residues with a characteristic spacing pattern. Functional analysis indicates that this protein is not a ligand or neurotransmitter but has the capacity to enhance nicotinic acetylcholine receptor function in the presence of acetylcholine. This gene may also play a role in the pathogenesis of psoriasis vulgaris.

The LYNX1 gene codes for a protein (Lynx1) that binds to acetylcholine receptors in the brain. Lynx1 a member of the Ly6 superfamily of proteins that are capable of modulating neurotransmitter receptors.

=== Lynx1 and Visual Plasticity ===
Transgenic mice without Lynx1 expression do not have a normal critical period of neuroplasticity in the visual cortex for development of ocular dominance columns. These mice show unusually rapid recovery from amblyopia in adulthood indicating a role in reduction of synaptic plasticity during the normal expression of Lynx1 in adult brain.

Lynx1 reduces adult visual cortex plasticity by binding to nicotinic acetylcholine receptors (NAchR) and diminishing acetylcholine signaling. After the developmental critical period and into adulthood, both Lynx1 mRNA and protein levels increase in the adult V1 and the lateral geniculate nucleus (LGN). Lynx1 and nAChR mRNAs are co-expressed in the LGN, as well as in parvalbumin-positive GABAergic interneurons. After monocular deprivation during the critical period to induce amblyopia, Lynx1 knock-out rat models spontaneously recovered normal visual acuity by reopening the closed eye. Similarly, an infusion of physostigmine to increase acetylcholine signaling prompted recovery from amblyopia in wild type mice Inhibition of Lynx1 may be a possible therapeutic mechanism to prolong synaptic plasticity of the visual cortex and improve binocular function of some amblyopes.

== See also ==
Other Ly6 family proteins that are expressed in the brain: Lynx2, LYPD6, LYPD6B and PSCA.
