= Soluble urokinase plasminogen activator receptor =

Soluble urokinase plasminogen activator receptor (suPAR) (NCBI Accession no. AAK31795) is a protein and the soluble form of uPAR. uPAR is expressed mainly on immune cells, endothelial cells, and smooth muscle cells. uPAR is a membrane-bound receptor for uPA, also known as urokinase and Vitronectin. The soluble version of uPAR, called suPAR, results from the cleavage and membrane-bound uPAR during inflammation or immune activation. The suPAR concentration is positively correlated to the activation level of the immune system. Therefore, suPAR is a marker of disease severity and aggressiveness and is associated with morbidity and mortality in several acute and chronic diseases. suPAR levels have been observed to increase with age. suPAR is present in plasma, urine, blood, serum, and cerebrospinal fluid.

== General population ==
In the general population, the suPAR level is higher in females than in males. The median suPAR level for men and women in blood donors is 2.22 ng/mL and 2.54 ng/mL, respectively. In general, women have slightly higher suPAR than men. suPAR levels are higher in serum than in plasma for the same individual.

== Clinical significance ==
suPAR is a biomarker reflecting the level of activity of the immune system in response to an inflammatory stimulus. suPAR levels positively correlate with pro-inflammatory biomarkers, including tumor necrosis factor-α (TNFα) and C-reactive protein (CRP) and other parameters, including leukocyte counts. suPAR is also associated with organ damage in various diseases.[2-5] Elevated levels of suPAR are associated with increased risk of systemic inflammatory response syndrome (SIRS), cancer, focal segmental glomerulosclerosis, cardiovascular disease, type 2 diabetes, infectious diseases, HIV, and mortality.

=== Acute medical patients ===
In the emergency departments, suPAR can aid in the triage and risk assessment of patients. This allows for many patients can be discharged rather than admitted. This also ensures that the most ill patients are prioritised first and put under careful observation without delay. A suPAR level below 4 ng/mL indicates a good prognosis in acute medical patients and supports discharge. In contrast, patients presenting with a suPAR level above 6 ng/mL have a high risk of a negative outcome.

=== COVID-19 ===
In COVID-19, an early elevation of suPAR, e.g. in patients that present with symptoms of SARS-CoV-2 infection, is associated with an increased risk of severe COVID-19 development, which may lead to respiratory failure, acute kidney injury, and death. Clinical relevant cut-offs have been identified with a suPAR below 4 ng/mL indicating low risk of adverse outcomes and a suPAR above 6 ng/mL for high risk of negative outcomes such as severe respiratory failure.

== Cardiovascular diseases ==
The suPAR level is elevated in patients with cardiovascular diseases compared to healthy individuals. suPAR is a predictor of cardiovascular morbidity and mortality in the general population.

== Nephrology ==
In the kidneys, suPAR plays a role in regulating the permeability of the glomerular filtration barrier. An elevated suPAR level is associated with chronic renal diseases, the future incidence of chronic renal diseases, and declining eGFR. A high level is significantly associated with mortality and incidence of cardiovascular diseases in these patients.

== Molecular characteristics ==
suPAR has a secondary structure of 17 anti-parallel β-sheets with three short α-helices. It consists of the three homologous domains D1, D2, and D3. Comparing cDNA sequences, D1 differs from D2 and D3 in its primary and tertiary structure, causing its distinct ligand binding properties.

uPAR has cleavage sites for several proteases in the linker region (chymotrypsin, elastase, matrix metalloproteases, cathepsin G, plasmin, urokinase plasminogen activator [uPA, or urokinase]), and in the GPI anchor (phospholipase C and D, cathepsin G, plasmin).

The GPI-anchor links uPAR to the cell membrane making it available for uPA binding. When uPA is bound to the receptor, a cleavage between the GPI-anchor and D3 forms suPAR. Of the three suPAR forms: suPAR1-3, suPAR2-3, and suPAR1, suPAR2-3 is the chemotactic agent for promoting the immune system.

The molecular weight of suPAR varies between 24–66 kDa due to variations in posttranslational glycosylations. Additional isoforms generated by alternative splicing have been described on the RNA level, but whether these are transcribed and their possible roles remain unclear.

== Plasma and serum levels ==
suPAR is mainly measured in serum and plasma isolated from human venous blood.

== Technology ==
The suPAR level can be measured using the suPARnostic® product line. suPARnostic® is a CE-IVD certified antibody-based product range applied for quantitative measurements of suPAR in the clinical setting. Three product formats are available: 1) TurbiLatex, validated for clinical chemistry systems currently including the Roche Diagnostics cobas c501/2 and c701/2 systems; the Siemens ADVIA XPT and Atellica systems, and the Abbott Architect c and Alinity systems. 2) Quick Triage, which is a platform that is applied at the Point-Of-Care. 3) ELISA.
