= LY6E =

Protein-coding gene in the species Homo sapiens

Identifiers
- Aliases: LY6E, RIG-E, RIGE, SCA-2, SCA2, TSA-1, lymphocyte antigen 6 complex, locus E, lymphocyte antigen 6 family member E
- External IDs: OMIM: 601384; MGI: 106651; GeneCards: LY6E

Gene location (Human)
| Chr. | Chromosome 8 (human) |
| Band | 8q24.3 | Start | 143,017,982 bp |
| Band | 8q24.3 | End | 143,023,832 bp |

Gene location (Mouse)
| Chr. | Chromosome 15 (mouse) |
| Band | 15 D3|15 34.29 cM | Start | 74,826,900 bp |
| Band | 15 D3|15 34.29 cM | End | 74,831,754 bp |
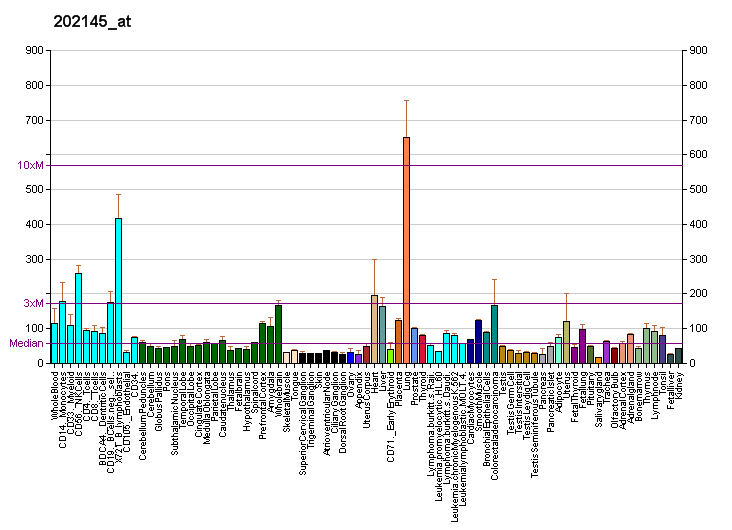
RNA expression pattern
| Bgee | Human / Mouse (ortholog); Top expressed in: right lobe of liver; granulocyte; olfactory zone of nasal mucosa; stromal cell of endometrium; placenta; right ovary; right lung; upper lobe of left lung; right frontal lobe; hippocampus proper / Top expressed in: lactiferous gland; superior surface of tongue; gallbladder; corneal stroma; cardiac muscles; cardiac muscle tissue of left ventricle; CA3 field; right kidney; perirhinal cortex; esophagus; More reference expression data |
| BioGPS | More reference expression data |
Gene ontology
| Molecular function | acetylcholine receptor inhibitor activity |
| Cellular component | integral component of plasma membrane; membrane; anchored component of membrane; extracellular region; plasma membrane |
| Biological process | cell surface receptor signaling pathway; negative regulation of signaling receptor activity |
Sources:Amigo / QuickGO
Orthologs
| Databases | NCBI: entry; OMA: entry |
| Species | Human | Mouse |
| Entrez | 4061 | 17069 |
| Ensembl | ENSG00000278032; ENSG00000160932 | ENSMUSG00000022587 |
| UniProt | Q16553 | Q64253 |
| RefSeq (mRNA) | NM_002346; NM_001127213 | NM_001164036; NM_001164037; NM_001164038; NM_001164039; NM_001164040 NM_008529; NM_001374138 |
| RefSeq (protein) | NP_001120685; NP_002337 | NP_001157508; NP_001157509; NP_001157510; NP_001157511; NP_001157512 NP_032555; NP_001361067 |
| Location (UCSC) | Chr 8: 143.02 – 143.02 Mb | Chr 15: 74.83 – 74.83 Mb |
| PubMed search |
- Wikidata
| View/Edit Human | View/Edit Mouse |

Lymphocyte antigen 6E is a protein that in humans is encoded by the LY6E gene. Increased expression of Ly6E is associated with poor survival outcome in multiple malignancies as determined by a survey of more than 130 published clinical studies of gene expression studies on cancer tissue samples and adjacent normal tissues. Ly6E is associated with drug resistance and tumor immune escape in breast cancer.
