= LYPD3 =

Protein-coding gene

Identifiers
- Aliases: LYPD3, C4.4A, LY6/PLAUR domain containing 3
- External IDs: OMIM: 609484; MGI: 1919684; GeneCards: LYPD3

Gene location (Human)
Chr.	Chromosome 19 (human)
Band	19q13.31	Start	43,460,787 bp
Band	19q13.31	End	43,465,608 bp

Gene location (Mouse)
Chr.	Chromosome 7 (mouse)
Band	7|7 A3	Start	24,335,975 bp
Band	7|7 A3	End	24,340,543 bp
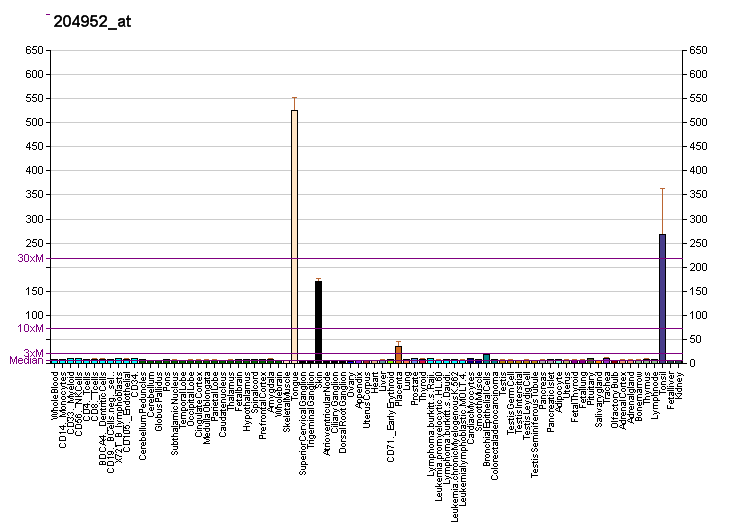
RNA expression pattern
Bgee	Human / Mouse (ortholog); Top expressed in: gingival epithelium; mucosa of pharynx; skin of abdomen; nipple; skin of arm; vulva; human penis; skin of leg; skin of thigh; body of tongue / Top expressed in: lip; esophagus; hair follicle; skin of external ear; skin of abdomen; zygote; skin of back; conjunctival fornix; primary oocyte; transitional epithelium of urinary bladder; More reference expression data
BioGPS	More reference expression data
Gene ontology
Molecular function	laminin binding
Cellular component	integral component of membrane; anchored component of membrane; anchored component of plasma membrane; membrane; extracellular region; extracellular space; plasma membrane
Biological process	cell-matrix adhesion; C-terminal protein lipidation
Sources:Amigo / QuickGO
Orthologs
Databases	NCBI: entry; OMA: entry
Species	Human	Mouse
Entrez	27076	72434
Ensembl	ENSG00000124466	ENSMUSG00000057454
UniProt	O95274	Q91YK8
RefSeq (mRNA)	NM_014400	NM_133743
RefSeq (protein)	NP_055215	NP_598504
Location (UCSC)	Chr 19: 43.46 – 43.47 Mb	Chr 7: 24.34 – 24.34 Mb
PubMed search
- Wikidata
View/Edit Human	View/Edit Mouse

Ly6/PLAUR domain-containing protein 3 is a protein that in humans is encoded by the LYPD3 gene.
