= LY6/PLAUR domain containing 5 =

Protein-coding gene in the species Homo sapiens

LYPD5

Identifiers
- Aliases: LYPD5, PRO4356, LY6/PLAUR domain containing 5, HALDISIN
- External IDs: MGI: 1924192; GeneCards: LYPD5

Gene location (Human)
| Chr. | Chromosome 19 (human) |
| Band | 19q13.31 | Start | 43,785,874 bp |
| Band | 19q13.31 | End | 43,827,206 bp |

Gene location (Mouse)
| Chr. | Chromosome 7 (mouse) |
| Band | 7|7 A3 | Start | 24,048,621 bp |
| Band | 7|7 A3 | End | 24,054,534 bp |
RNA expression pattern
| Bgee | Human / Mouse (ortholog); Top expressed in: skin of leg; skin of abdomen; skin of arm; right frontal lobe; Brodmann area 9; cingulate gyrus; anterior cingulate cortex; prefrontal cortex; testicle; mucosa of esophagus / Top expressed in: esophagus; skin of abdomen; lip; skin of back; skin of external ear; condyle; umbilical cord; epidermis; hair follicle; fossa; More reference expression data |
| BioGPS | n/a |
Gene ontology
| Molecular function | laminin binding |
| Cellular component | membrane; anchored component of membrane; extracellular region; plasma membrane |
| Biological process | cell-matrix adhesion |
Sources:Amigo / QuickGO
Orthologs
| Databases | NCBI: entry; OMA: entry |
| Species | Human | Mouse |
| Entrez | 284348 | 76942 |
| Ensembl | ENSG00000159871 | ENSMUSG00000030484 |
| UniProt | Q6UWN5 | Q9D7Z7 |
| RefSeq (mRNA) | NM_001031749; NM_001288763; NM_182573 | NM_029806 |
| RefSeq (protein) | NP_001026919; NP_001275692; NP_872379 | NP_084082 |
| Location (UCSC) | Chr 19: 43.79 – 43.83 Mb | Chr 7: 24.05 – 24.05 Mb |
| PubMed search |
- Wikidata
| View/Edit Human | View/Edit Mouse |

LY6/PLAUR domain containing 5 is a protein that in humans is encoded by the LYPD5 gene.
