= SLURP1 =

Protein-coding gene in the species Homo sapiens

Identifiers
- Aliases: SLURP1, ANUP, ARS, ArsB, LY6LS, MDM, secreted LY6/PLAUR domain containing 1, LY6-MT
- External IDs: OMIM: 606119; MGI: 1930923; GeneCards: SLURP1
Available structures
PDB	Ortholog search: PDBe RCSB
PDB	List of PDB id codes 2MUP, 2MUO

Gene location (Human)
Chr.	Chromosome 8 (human)
Band	8q24.3	Start	142,740,949 bp
Band	8q24.3	End	142,742,406 bp

Gene location (Mouse)
Chr.	Chromosome 15 (mouse)
Band	15|15 D3	Start	74,596,167 bp
Band	15|15 D3	End	74,599,883 bp
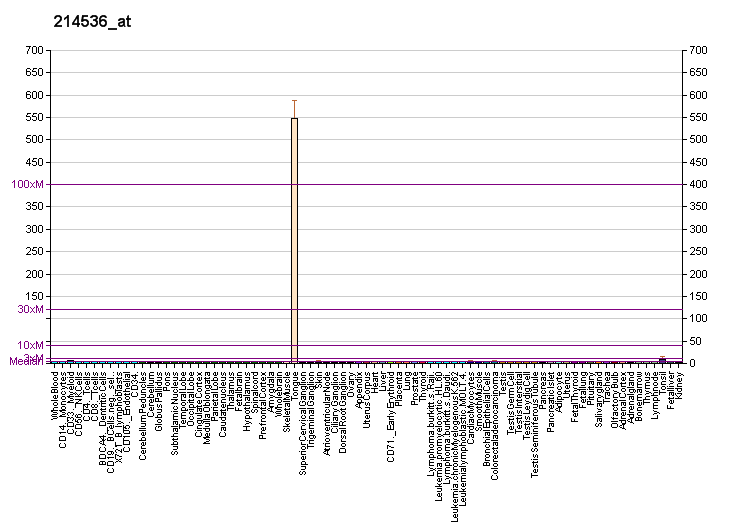
RNA expression pattern
Bgee	Human / Mouse (ortholog); Top expressed in: skin of leg; mucosa of pharynx; human penis; skin of arm; skin of abdomen; oral cavity; skin of thigh; body of tongue; vulva; gums / Top expressed in: lip; skin of external ear; esophagus; pyloric antrum; mucous cell of stomach; cornea; cervix; ankle; spermatocyte; embryo; More reference expression data
BioGPS	More reference expression data
Gene ontology
Molecular function	cytokine activity; acetylcholine receptor activator activity; protein binding
Cellular component	extracellular exosome; extracellular space; extracellular region
Biological process	cell adhesion; negative regulation of keratinocyte proliferation; neuromuscular process controlling posture; locomotory behavior; cell activation; negative regulation of cell population proliferation; negative regulation of cell migration; urokinase plasminogen activator signaling pathway; positive regulation of signaling receptor activity; regulation of signaling receptor activity; regulation of neurotransmitter receptor activity
Sources:Amigo / QuickGO
Orthologs
Databases	NCBI: entry; OMA: entry
Species	Human	Mouse
Entrez	57152	57277
Ensembl	ENSG00000126233	ENSMUSG00000022596
UniProt	P55000	Q9Z0K7
RefSeq (mRNA)	NM_020427	NM_020519
RefSeq (protein)	NP_065160	NP_065265
Location (UCSC)	Chr 8: 142.74 – 142.74 Mb	Chr 15: 74.6 – 74.6 Mb
PubMed search
- Wikidata
View/Edit Human	View/Edit Mouse

Secreted Ly-6/uPAR-related protein 1 is a protein that in humans is encoded by the SLURP1 gene. It exerts anti-inflammatory effects, acts as a tumor suppressor, and antagonizes nicotinic receptors.

== Function ==
The protein encoded by this gene is a member of the Ly6/uPAR family but lacks a GPI-anchoring signal sequence. It is secreted into the blood and is also sometimes found in semen when extracted into the female zygote which binds to the α7-acetylcholine receptor. It is shown to act as an endogenous tumor suppressor by reducing cell migration and invasion by mediating its own anti-tumor effect and by antagonizing the pro-malignant effects of nicotine.

Mutations in this gene have been associated with Mal de Meleda, a rare autosomal recessive skin disorder characterized by an inflammatory palmoplantar hyperkeratosis. This is the consequence of a loss of SLURP1 which leads to a dysfunctional epithelial differentiation and an increased secretion of the inflammatory cytokines TNFα, IL1, IL-6, and IL-8.

This gene maps to the same chromosomal region as several members of the Ly6/uPAR family of glycoprotein receptors.
