= Prostate stem cell antigen =

Protein-coding gene in the species Homo sapiens

PSCA

Identifiers
- Aliases: PSCA, PRO232, prostate stem cell antigen, lncPSCA
- External IDs: OMIM: 602470; MGI: 1919623; GeneCards: PSCA

Gene location (Human)
Chr.	Chromosome 8 (human)
Band	8q24.3	Start	142,670,308 bp
Band	8q24.3	End	142,682,725 bp

Gene location (Mouse)
Chr.	Chromosome 15 (mouse)
Band	15|15 D3	Start	74,586,688 bp
Band	15|15 D3	End	74,588,918 bp
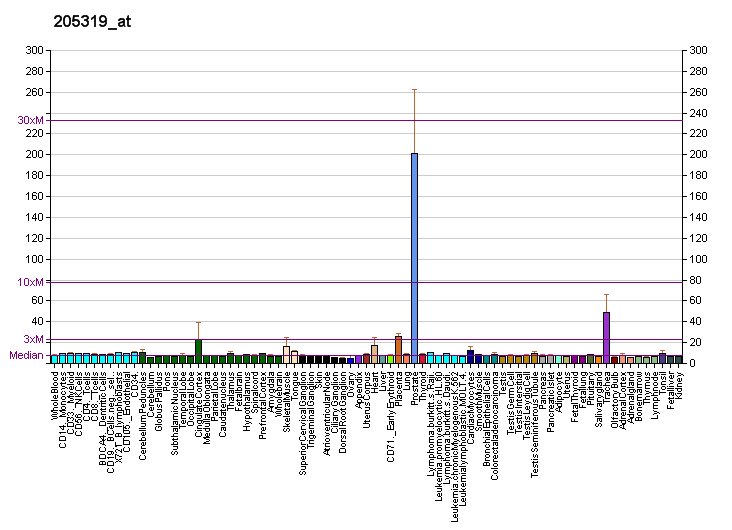
RNA expression pattern
Bgee	Human / Mouse (ortholog); Top expressed in: gastric mucosa; olfactory zone of nasal mucosa; epithelium of bronchus; body of stomach; urinary bladder; prostate; vagina; trachea; fundus; skin of leg / Top expressed in: epithelium of stomach; mucous cell of stomach; transitional epithelium of urinary bladder; pyloric antrum; gastrula; right kidney; mucosa of large intestine; inner renal medulla; urethra; corneal stroma; More reference expression data
BioGPS	More reference expression data
Gene ontology
Molecular function	acetylcholine receptor binding
Cellular component	membrane; extracellular exosome; anchored component of membrane; extracellular region; plasma membrane
Biological process	C-terminal protein lipidation; negative regulation of ERK1 and ERK2 cascade; regulation of neurotransmitter receptor activity
Sources:Amigo / QuickGO
Orthologs
Databases	NCBI: entry; OMA: entry
Species	Human	Mouse
Entrez	8000	72373
Ensembl	ENSG00000167653	ENSMUSG00000022598
UniProt	O43653	P57096
RefSeq (mRNA)	NM_005672	NM_028216
RefSeq (protein)	NP_005663	NP_082492
Location (UCSC)	Chr 8: 142.67 – 142.68 Mb	Chr 15: 74.59 – 74.59 Mb
PubMed search
- Wikidata
View/Edit Human	View/Edit Mouse

Prostate stem cell antigen is a protein that in humans is encoded by the PSCA gene.

This gene encodes a glycosylphosphatidylinositol-anchored cell membrane glycoprotein. In addition to being highly expressed in the prostate it is also expressed in the bladder, placenta, colon, kidney, and stomach. This gene has a nonsynonymous nucleotide polymorphism at its start codon.

== Clinical significance ==
This gene is up-regulated in a large proportion of prostate cancers and is also detected in cancers of the bladder and pancreas.

== Mechanism ==
A study reviewing the potential role of PSCA proposed that expression of the gene is regulated through the androgen receptor complex. The proteins translated from the gene, is then glycosylated in the ER, and transported to the cell membrane where it is connected to a lipid. This results in the formation of a GPI-anchored proteins, these proteins can be often secreted by cells or play a role in cell signaling. While, the ligand activating PSCA or the downstream physiological role has not yet been determined, because of its mechanism and over expression in prostate cancer cells, PSCA can potentially serve as a biomarker for detecting cancer.
