= Phosphatidylinositol N-acetylglucosaminyltransferase =

Class of enzymes

phosphatidylinositol N-acetylglucosaminyltransferase

Identifiers
- EC no.: 2.4.1.198
- CAS no.: 144388-35-2

Databases
- IntEnz: IntEnz view
- BRENDA: BRENDA entry
- ExPASy: NiceZyme view
- KEGG: KEGG entry
- MetaCyc: metabolic pathway
- PRIAM: profile
- PDB structures: RCSB PDB PDBe PDBsum
- Gene Ontology: AmiGO / QuickGO
Search
- PMC: articles
- PubMed: articles
- NCBI: proteins

In enzymology, a phosphatidylinositol N-acetylglucosaminyltransferase (EC 2.4.1.198) is an enzyme that catalyzes the chemical reaction

UDP-N-acetylglucosamine + phosphatidylinositol $\rightleftharpoons$ UDP + N-acetyl-D-glucosaminylphosphatidylinositol

Thus, the two substrates of this enzyme are UDP-N-acetylglucosamine and phosphatidylinositol, whereas its two products are UDP and N-acetyl-D-glucosaminylphosphatidylinositol.

The mammalian enzyme is composed of at least six subunits (PIG-A, PIG-H, PIG-C, PIG-P, PIG-Y, and GPI1). PIG-A is the catalytic subunit.

This enzyme belongs to the family of glycosyltransferases, to be specific the hexosyltransferases. The systematic name of this enzyme class is UDP-N-acetyl-D-glucosamine:1-phosphatidyl-1D-myo-inositol 6-(N-acetyl-alpha-D-glucosaminyl)transferase. Other names in common use include UDP-N-acetyl-D-glucosamine:phosphatidylinositol, N-acetyl-D-glucosaminyltransferase, uridine diphosphoacetylglucosamine, and alpha1,6-acetyl-D-glucosaminyltransferase. This enzyme participates in 3 metabolic pathways: glycosylphosphatidylinositol(gpi)-anchor, ???, and glycan structures - biosynthesis 2.
