= Endo-alpha-N-acetylgalactosaminidase =

Endo-alpha-N-acetylgalactosaminidase may refer to:

- Mucinaminylserine mucinaminidase, an enzyme
- Glycopeptide alpha-N-acetylgalactosaminidase, an enzyme
