= Pig-a gene mutation assay =

Pig-a gene mutation assay is a flow cytometry-based method for detecting mammalian cells that have inactivating mutations in the endogenous X-linked reporter gene called phosphatidyl inositolglycan class A gene (PIG-A in humans and non-human primates, Pig-a in other mammalian species). PIG-A is involved in the synthesis of glycosylphosphatidylinositol (GPI), an anchor molecule that tethers multiple protein marker molecules at the surface of the cells. When the sample containing wild-type and PIG-A mutant cells is labeled with fluorescent antibodies raised against GPI-anchored protein markers (such as CD24, CD48, CD55, CD59) the wild-type cells will fluoresce and PIG-A mutant cells will not. The fraction of non-fluorescent PIG-A mutant cells in the antibody-labeled sample can be efficiently determined on any of the modern high throughput flow cytometers. The PIG-A mutant fraction can be determined with high accuracy within minutes by processing samples containing a total of a million cells or more.

== Application ==
Originally, PIG-A assay was proposed as a method for monitoring humans for somatic mutation. The assay was developed as an extension of flow cytometric procedure for diagnosing human acquired genetic disorder, paroxysmal nocturnal hemoglobinuria (PNH). PIG-A assays were developed for cells of peripheral blood, such as red blood cells (RBCs) and white blood cells (WBCs). Due to conservative nature of GPI biosynthesis in mammalian species, similar flow cytometry protocols were developed for mammalian species of toxicological interest, i.e., mice and rats. The most demanding RBC-based Pig-a assay requires only microliter volumes of peripheral blood which is easy to obtain without harming the animals. Therefore, the Pig-a assay can be added to various non-clinical in vivo safety evaluations mandated by regulatory authorities as a test measuring a value end-point, i.e., gene mutation, without requiring additional groups of animals for testing. Government agencies, such as the US Food and Drug Administration and United States Environmental Protection Agency, require testing novel pharmaceuticals and high volume industrial chemicals for mutagenicity as a screen for potential carcinogens. An in vivo RBC Pig-a assay is an optional test for qualification of genotoxic impurities as described in FDA's ICH M7 guidance. A standardized regulatory-compliant Test Guideline for performing Pig-a assay and interpreting the test results, Test No. 470, was developed under the auspices of The Organisation for Economic Co-operation and Development.
