= Glycosylation =

Biochemical process

A reaction in which a carbohydrate, such as a sugar, is attached to another molecule, often a protein or a lipid.

Glycosylation is the reaction in which a carbohydrate (or 'glycan'), i.e. a glycosyl donor, is attached to a hydroxyl or other functional group of another molecule (a glycosyl acceptor) in order to form a glycoconjugate. In biology (but not always in chemistry), glycosylation usually refers to an enzyme-catalysed reaction, whereas glycation (also 'non-enzymatic glycation' and 'non-enzymatic glycosylation') may refer to a non-enzymatic reaction.

Glycosylation of proteins is a form of co-translational and post-translational modification. Glycans serve a variety of structural and functional roles in membrane and secreted proteins. The majority of proteins synthesized in the rough endoplasmic reticulum undergo glycosylation. Glycosylation is also present in the cytoplasm and nucleus as the O-GlcNAc modification. Aglycosylation is a feature of engineered antibodies to bypass glycosylation. Five classes of glycans are produced:

- N-linked glycans attached to a nitrogen of asparagine or arginine side-chains. N-linked glycosylation requires participation of a special lipid called dolichol phosphate.
- O-linked glycans attached to the hydroxyl oxygen of serine, threonine, tyrosine, hydroxylysine, or hydroxyproline side-chains, or to oxygens on lipids such as ceramide.
- Phosphoglycans linked through the phosphate of a phosphoserine.
- C-linked glycans, a rare form of glycosylation where a sugar is added to a carbon on a tryptophan side-chain. Aloin is one of the few naturally occurring substances.
- Glypiation, which is the addition of a GPI anchor that links proteins to lipids through glycan linkages.

== Purpose ==
Glycosylation is the process by which a carbohydrate is covalently attached to a target macromolecule, typically proteins and lipids. This modification serves various functions. For instance, some proteins do not fold correctly unless they are glycosylated. In other cases, proteins are not stable unless they contain oligosaccharides linked at the amide nitrogen of certain asparagine residues. The influence of glycosylation on the folding and stability of glycoprotein is twofold. Firstly, the highly soluble glycans may have a direct physicochemical stabilisation effect. Secondly, N-linked glycans mediate a critical quality control check point in glycoprotein folding in the endoplasmic reticulum. Glycosylation also plays a role in cell-to-cell adhesion (a mechanism employed by cells of the immune system) via sugar-binding proteins called lectins, which recognize specific carbohydrate moieties. Glycosylation is an important parameter in the optimization of many glycoprotein-based drugs such as monoclonal antibodies. Glycosylation also underpins the ABO blood group system. It is the presence or absence of glycosyltransferases which dictates which blood group antigens are presented and hence what antibody specificities are exhibited. This immunological role may well have driven the diversification of glycan heterogeneity and creates a barrier to zoonotic transmission of viruses. In addition, glycosylation is often used by viruses to shield the underlying viral protein from immune recognition. A significant example is the dense glycan shield of the envelope spike of the human immunodeficiency virus.

Overall, glycosylation needs to be understood by the likely evolutionary selection pressures that have shaped it. In one model, diversification can be considered purely as a result of endogenous functionality (such as cell trafficking). However, it is more likely that diversification is driven by evasion of pathogen infection mechanism (e.g. Helicobacter attachment to terminal saccharide residues) and that diversity within the multicellular organism is then exploited endogenously.

Glycosylation can also modulate the thermodynamic and kinetic stability of the proteins.

== Glycoprotein diversity ==
Glycosylation increases diversity in the proteome, because almost every aspect of glycosylation can be modified, including:

- Glycosidic bond—the site of glycan linkage
- Glycan composition—the types of sugars that are linked to a given protein
- Glycan structure—can be unbranched or branched chains of sugars
- Glycan length—can be short- or long-chain oligosaccharides

== Mechanisms ==
There are various mechanisms for glycosylation, although most share several common features:

- Glycosylation, unlike glycation, is an enzymatic process. Indeed, glycosylation of proteins is thought to be the most complex post-translational modification, because of the large number of enzymatic steps involved.
- The donor molecule is often an activated nucleotide sugar.
- The process is non-templated (unlike DNA transcription or protein translation); instead, the cell relies on segregating enzymes into different cellular compartments (e.g., endoplasmic reticulum, cisternae in Golgi apparatus). Therefore, glycosylation is a site-specific modification.

== Types in proteins ==
=== N-linked glycosylation ===
N-linked glycosylation is a very prevalent form of glycosylation and is important for the folding of many eukaryotic glycoproteins and for cell–cell and cell–extracellular matrix attachment. The N-linked glycosylation process occurs in eukaryotes in the lumen of the endoplasmic reticulum and widely in archaea, but very rarely in bacteria. In addition to their function in protein folding and cellular attachment, the N-linked glycans of a protein can modulate a protein's function, in some cases acting as an on/off switch.

=== O-linked glycosylation ===
O-linked glycosylation is a form of glycosylation that occurs in eukaryotes in the Golgi apparatus, but also occurs in archaea and bacteria.

=== Phosphoserine glycosylation ===
Xylose, fucose, mannose, and GlcNAc phosphoserine glycans have been reported in the literature. Fucose and GlcNAc have been found only in Dictyostelium discoideum, mannose in Leishmania mexicana, and xylose in Trypanosoma cruzi. Mannose has recently been reported in a vertebrate, the mouse, Mus musculus, on the cell-surface laminin receptor alpha dystroglycan^{4}. It has been suggested this rare finding may be linked to the fact that alpha dystroglycan is highly conserved from lower vertebrates to mammals.

=== C-mannosylation ===
The mannose molecule is attached to the C2 of the first tryptophan of the sequence

A mannose sugar is added to the first tryptophan residue in the sequence W–X–X–W (W indicates tryptophan; X is any amino acid). A C-C bond is formed between the first carbon of the alpha-mannose and the second carbon of the tryptophan. However, not all the sequences that have this pattern are mannosylated. It has been established that, in fact, only two thirds are and that there is a clear preference for the second amino acid to be one of the polar ones (Ser, Ala, Gly and Thr) in order for mannosylation to occur. Recently there has been a breakthrough in the technique of predicting whether or not the sequence will have a mannosylation site that provides an accuracy of 93% opposed to the 67% accuracy if we just consider the WXXW motif.

Thrombospondins are one of the proteins most commonly modified in this way. However, there is another group of proteins that undergo C-mannosylation, type I cytokine receptors. C-mannosylation is unusual because the sugar is linked to a carbon rather than a reactive atom such as nitrogen or oxygen. In 2011, the first crystal structure of a protein containing this type of glycosylation was determined—that of human complement component 8. Currently it is established that 18% of human proteins, secreted and transmembrane undergo the process of C-mannosylation. Numerous studies have shown that this process plays an important role in the secretion of Trombospondin type 1 containing proteins which are retained in the endoplasmic reticulum if they do not undergo C-mannosylation This explains why a type of cytokine receptors, erythropoietin receptor remained in the endoplasmic reticulum if it lacked C-mannosylation sites.

=== Formation of GPI anchors (glypiation) ===
Glypiation is a special form of glycosylation that features the formation of a GPI anchor. In this kind of glycosylation a protein is attached to a lipid anchor, via a glycan chain. (See also prenylation.)

=== Non-enzymatic glycosylation ===
The non-enzymatic glycosylation is also known as glycation or non-enzymatic glycation. It is a spontaneous reaction and a type of post-translational modification of proteins meaning it alters their structure and biological activity. It is the covalent attachment between the carbonil group of a reducing sugar (mainly glucose and fructose) and the amino acid side chain of the protein. In this process the intervention of an enzyme is not needed. It takes place across and close to the water channels and the protruding tubules.

At first, the reaction forms temporary molecules which later undergo different reactions (Amadori rearrangements, Schiff base reactions, Maillard reactions, crosslinkings...) and form permanent residues known as Advanced Glycation end-products (AGEs).

AGEs accumulate in long-lived extracellular proteins such as collagen which is the most glycated and structurally abundant protein, especially in humans. Also, some studies have shown lysine may trigger spontaneous non-enzymatic glycosylation.

==== Role of AGEs ====
AGEs are responsible for many things. These molecules play an important role especially in nutrition, they are responsible for the brownish color and the aromas and flavors of some foods. It is demonstrated that cooking at high temperature results in various food products having high levels of AGEs.

Having elevated levels of AGEs in the body has a direct impact on the development of many diseases. It has a direct implication in diabetes mellitus type 2 that can lead to many complications such as: cataracts, renal failure, heart damage... And, if they are present at a decreased level, skin elasticity is reduced which is an important symptom of aging.

They are also the precursors of many hormones and regulate and modify their receptor mechanisms at the DNA level.

== Chemical glycosylation ==
Glycosylation can also be effected using the tools of synthetic organic chemistry. Unlike the biochemical processes, synthetic glycochemistry relies heavily on protecting groups (e.g. the 4,6-O-benzylidene) in order to achieve desired regioselectivity. It also differs from the biochemical processes by typically requiring organic solvents, although methods compatible with water and aqueous media are also known. Another challenge of chemical glycosylation is the stereoselectivity that each glycosidic linkage has two stereo-outcomes, 1,2-cis or 1,2-trans. Generally, the 1,2-cis-glycoside is more challenging to synthesise. New methods have been developed based on solvent participation or the formation of bicyclic sulfonium ions as chiral-auxiliary groups.

== Deglycosylation ==
There are different enzymes to remove the glycans from the proteins or remove some part of the sugar chain.

- α2-3,6,8,9-Neuraminidase (from Arthrobacter ureafaciens): cleaves all non-reducing terminal branched and unbranched sialic acids.
- β1,4-Galactosidase (from Streptococcus pneumoniae): releases only β1,4-linked, nonreducing terminal galactose from complex carbohydrates and glycoproteins.
- β-N-Acetylglucosaminidase (from Streptococcus pneumoniae): cleaves all non-reducing terminal β-linked N-acetylglucosamine residues from complex carbohydrates and glycoproteins.
- endo-α-N-Acetylgalactosaminidase (O-glycosidase from Streptococcus pneumoniae): removes O-glycosylation. This enzyme cleaves serine- or threonine-linked unsubstituted Galβ1,3GalNAc
- PNGase F: cleaves asparagine-linked oligosaccharides unless α1,3-core fucosylated.

== Regulation of Notch signalling ==
Notch signalling is a cell signalling pathway whose role is, among many others, to control the cell differentiation process in equivalent precursor cells. This means it is crucial in embryonic development, to the point that it has been tested on mice that the removal of glycans in Notch proteins can result in embryonic death or malformations of vital organs like the heart.

Some of the specific modulators that control this process are glycosyltransferases located in the endoplasmic reticulum and the Golgi apparatus. The Notch proteins go through these organelles in their maturation process and can be subject to different types of glycosylation: N-linked glycosylation and O-linked glycosylation (more specifically: O-linked glucose and O-linked fucose).

All of the Notch proteins are modified by an O-fucose, because they share a common trait: O-fucosylation consensus sequences. One of the modulators that intervene in this process is the Fringe, a glycosyltransferase that modifies the O-fucose to activate or deactivate parts of the signalling, acting as a positive or negative regulator, respectively.

== Clinical ==
There are three types of glycosylation disorders sorted by the type of alterations that are made to the glycosylation process: congenital alterations, acquired alterations and non-enzymatic acquired alterations.

- Congenital alterations: Over 40 congenital disorders of glycosylation (CGDs) have been reported in humans. These can be divided into four groups: disorders of protein N-glycosylation, disorders of protein O-glycosylation, disorders of lipid glycosylation and disorders of other glycosylation pathways and of multiple glycosylation pathways. No effective treatment is known for any of these disorders. 80% of these affect the nervous system.
- Acquired alterations: In this second group the main disorders are infectious diseases, autoimmune illnesses or cancer. In these cases, the changes in glycosylation are the cause of certain biological events. For example, in Rheumatoid Arthritis (RA), the body of the patient produces antibodies against the enzyme lymphocytes galactosyltransferase which inhibits the glycosylation of IgG. Therefore, the changes in the N-glycosylation produce the immunodeficiency involved in this illness. In this second group we can also find disorders caused by mutations on the enzymes that control the glycosylation of Notch proteins, such as Alagille syndrome.
- Non-enzymatic acquired alterations: Non-enzymatic disorders, are also acquired, but they are due to the lack of enzymes that attach oligosaccharides to the protein. In this group the illnesses that stand out are Alzheimer's disease and diabetes.

All these diseases are difficult to diagnose because they do not only affect one organ; they affect many of them and in different ways. As a consequence, they are also hard to treat. However, many advances have been made in next-generation sequencing that enable scientists to understand better these disorders and discover new CDGs.

=== Effects on therapeutic efficacy ===
It has been reported that mammalian glycosylation can improve the therapeutic efficacy of biotherapeutics. For example, therapeutic efficacy of recombinant human interferon gamma, expressed in HEK 293 platform, was improved against drug-resistant ovarian cancer cell lines.

== See also ==
- Advanced glycation endproduct – Proteins or lipids chemically altered by sugar exposure
- Chemical glycosylation – Reaction of a glycosyl donor and acceptor
- Fucosylation – Covalent attachment of a fucosyl group to an acceptor molecule
- Glycation – Attachment of a sugar to a protein or lipid
- Glycorandomization – Technology enabling rapid molecule diversification
