= Glypiation =

Post-translational modification

Glypiation is the addition by covalent bonding of a glycosylphosphatidylinositol (GPI) anchor and is a common post-translational modification that localizes proteins to cell membranes. This special kind of glycosylation is widely detected on surface glycoproteins in eukaryotes and some Archaea.

GPI anchors consist of a phosphoethanolamine linker that binds to the C-terminus of target proteins. Glycan's core structure has a phospholipid tail that anchors the structure to the membrane.

Both the lipid moiety of the tail and the sugar residues in the glycan core have considerable variation, demonstrating vast functional diversity that includes signal transduction, cell adhesion and immune recognition. GPI anchors can also be cleaved by enzymes such as phospholipase C to regulate the localization of proteins that are anchored at the plasma membrane.

== Mechanism ==
Similar to the precursor glycan used for N-glycosylation, GPI anchor biosynthesis begins on the cytoplasmic leaflet of the endoplasmic reticulum (ER) and is completed on the luminal side. During this process, 3-4 Man and various other sugars (e.g., GlcNAc, Gal) are built onto a phosphatidylinositol (PI) molecule embedded in the membrane using sugars donated from sugar nucleotides and dolichol-P-mannose outside and inside the ER, respectively. Additionally, 2-3 phosphoethanolamine (EtN-P) linker residues are donated from phosphatidylethanolamine in the ER lumen to facilitate binding of the anchor to proteins.

Proteins destined to be glypiated have two signal sequences:

- An N-terminal signal sequence that directs co-translational transport into the ER
- A C-terminal signal sequence that is recognized by a GPI transamidase (GPIT)

GPIT does not have a consensus sequence but instead recognizes a C-terminal sequence motif that enables it to covalently attach a GPI anchor to an amino acid in the sequence. This C-terminal sequence is embedded in the ER membrane immediately after translation, and the protein is then cleaved from the sequence and attached to a preformed GPI anchor.

== Prediction of glypiation sites in proteins ==
In silico prediction of glypiation sites can be performed by:

- GPI-SOM: Identification of GPI-anchor signals by a Kohonen Self Organizing Map
- PredGPI: a GPI-anchor predictor
- big-PI Predictor - GPI Modification Site Prediction
- FragAnchor: GPI-Anchored Protein Prediction Tandem System (NN+HMM)
- MemType-2L
- NetGPI
