= LY6G6E =

Pseudogene in the species Homo sapiens

Identifiers
- Aliases: LY6G6E, C6orf22, G6e, lymphocyte antigen 6 complex, locus G6E (pseudogene), lymphocyte antigen 6 family member G6E
- External IDs: OMIM: 610437; GeneCards: LY6G6E
Orthologs
Databases	NCBI: entry; OMA: entry
Species	Human	Mouse
Entrez	79136	n/a
Ensembl	ENSG00000255552	n/a
UniProt	n a	n/a
RefSeq (mRNA)	NM_001003721; NM_024123	n/a
RefSeq (protein)	n/a	n/a
Location (UCSC)	n/a	n/a
PubMed search		n/a
- Wikidata
View/Edit Human

Lymphocyte antigen 6 complex, locus G6E (pseudogene) is a protein that in humans is encoded by the LY6G6E gene.

== Function ==
LY6G6E belongs to a cluster of leukocyte antigen-6 (LY6) genes located in the major histocompatibility complex (MHC) class III region on chromosome 6. Members of the LY6 superfamily typically contain 70 to 80 amino acids, including 8 to 10 cysteines. Most LY6 proteins are attached to the cell surface by a glycosylphosphatidylinositol (GPI) anchor that is directly involved in signal transduction.
