= PIGP =

Protein-coding gene in the species Homo sapiens

Identifiers
- Aliases: PIGP, DCRC, DCRC-S, DSCR5, DSRC, PIG-P, phosphatidylinositol glycan anchor biosynthesis class P, EIEE55
- External IDs: OMIM: 605938; MGI: 1860433; HomoloGene: 32444; GeneCards: PIGP; OMA:PIGP - orthologs

Gene location (Human)
Chr.	Chromosome 21 (human)
Band	21q22.13	Start	37,059,170 bp
Band	21q22.13	End	37,073,170 bp

Gene location (Mouse)
Chr.	Chromosome 16 (mouse)
Band	16|16 C4	Start	94,159,622 bp
Band	16|16 C4	End	94,172,701 bp
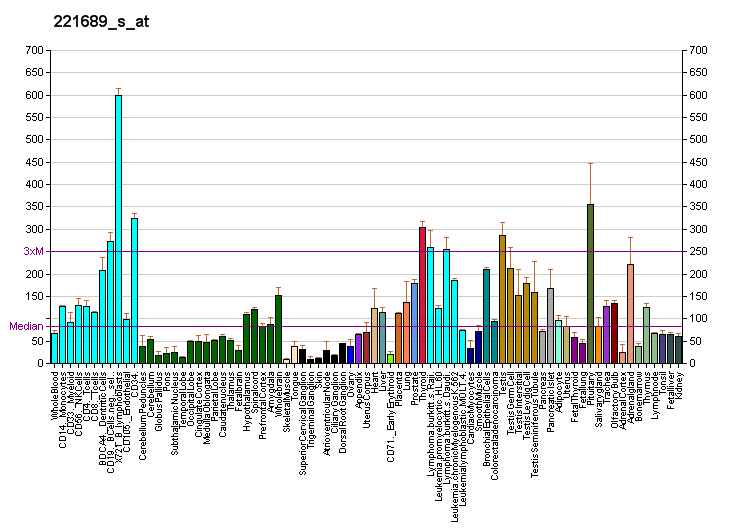
RNA expression pattern
Bgee	Human / Mouse (ortholog); Top expressed in: corpus epididymis; Skeletal muscle tissue of biceps brachii; tail of epididymis; thoracic diaphragm; myocardium; retinal pigment epithelium; vastus lateralis muscle; caput epididymis; bronchial epithelial cell; myocardium of left ventricle / Top expressed in: quadriceps femoris muscle; muscle tissue; muscle of thigh; skeletal muscle tissue; zone of skin; esophagus; heart; lens; pancreas; mesencephalon; More reference expression data
BioGPS	More reference expression data
Gene ontology
Molecular function	transferase activity; phosphatidylinositol N-acetylglucosaminyltransferase activity; glycosyltransferase activity
Cellular component	integral component of membrane; endoplasmic reticulum membrane; glycosylphosphatidylinositol-N-acetylglucosaminyltransferase (GPI-GnT) complex; membrane
Biological process	preassembly of GPI anchor in ER membrane; GPI anchor biosynthetic process
Sources:Amigo / QuickGO
Orthologs
Species	Human	Mouse
Entrez	51227	56176
Ensembl	ENSG00000185808	ENSMUSG00000022940
UniProt	P57054	Q9JHG1
RefSeq (mRNA)	NM_153681; NM_153682; NM_001320480; NM_016430	NM_001159616; NM_001159617; NM_001159618; NM_001159619; NM_001159620 NM_019543
RefSeq (protein)	NP_001307409; NP_057514; NP_710148; NP_710149	NP_001153088; NP_001153089; NP_001153090; NP_001153091; NP_001153092 NP_062416
Location (UCSC)	Chr 21: 37.06 – 37.07 Mb	Chr 16: 94.16 – 94.17 Mb
PubMed search
- Wikidata
View/Edit Human	View/Edit Mouse

Subunit P of phosphatidylinositol N-acetylglucosaminyltransferase is an enzyme subunit that in humans is encoded by the PIGP gene.

This gene encodes an enzyme involved in the first step of glycosylphosphatidylinositol (GPI)-anchor biosynthesis. The GPI anchor is a glycolipid found on many blood cells that serves to anchor proteins to the cell surface. The encoded protein is a component of the GPI-N-acetylglucosaminyltransferase complex that catalyzes the transfer of N-acetylglucosamine (GlcNAc) from UDP-GlcNAc to phosphatidylinositol (PI). This gene is located in the Down syndrome critical region on chromosome 21 and is a candidate for the pathogenesis of Down syndrome. Alternatively spliced transcript variants encoding different isoforms have been described.
