= PIGT =

Protein-coding gene in the species Homo sapiens

Identifiers
- Aliases: PIGT, MCAHS3, NDAP, PNH2, CGI-06, phosphatidylinositol glycan anchor biosynthesis class T
- External IDs: OMIM: 610272; MGI: 1926178; HomoloGene: 6134; GeneCards: PIGT; OMA:PIGT - orthologs

Gene location (Human)
Chr.	Chromosome 20 (human)
Band	20q13.12	Start	45,416,084 bp
Band	20q13.12	End	45,456,934 bp

Gene location (Mouse)
Chr.	Chromosome 2 (mouse)
Band	2|2 H3	Start	164,339,440 bp
Band	2|2 H3	End	164,350,221 bp
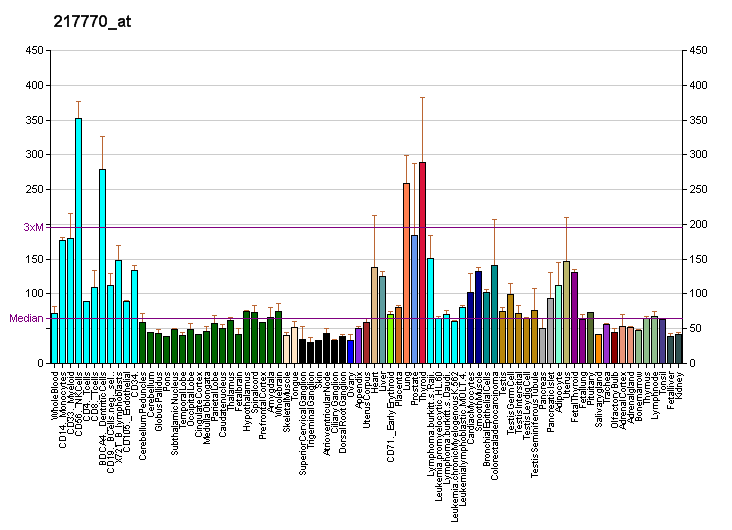
RNA expression pattern
Bgee	Human / Mouse (ortholog); Top expressed in: cardia; stromal cell of endometrium; pylorus; right coronary artery; Descending thoracic aorta; ascending aorta; right auricle of heart; left coronary artery; apex of heart; islet of Langerhans / Top expressed in: tail of embryo; lip; neural layer of retina; genital tubercle; superior frontal gyrus; dentate gyrus of hippocampal formation granule cell; muscle of thigh; ventricular zone; primary visual cortex; yolk sac; More reference expression data
BioGPS	More reference expression data
Gene ontology
Molecular function	protein binding; GPI-anchor transamidase activity
Cellular component	integral component of membrane; GPI-anchor transamidase complex; endoplasmic reticulum membrane; integral component of endoplasmic reticulum membrane; membrane; endoplasmic reticulum; cytoplasm; cytoplasmic vesicle
Biological process	attachment of GPI anchor to protein; neuron differentiation; GPI anchor biosynthetic process; neuron apoptotic process
Sources:Amigo / QuickGO
Orthologs
Species	Human	Mouse
Entrez	51604	78928
Ensembl	ENSG00000124155	ENSMUSG00000017721
UniProt	Q969N2	Q8BXQ2
RefSeq (mRNA)	NM_001184728; NM_001184729; NM_001184730; NM_015937	NM_133779; NM_001362644; NM_001362645; NM_001378795
RefSeq (protein)	NP_001171657; NP_001171658; NP_001171659; NP_057021	NP_598540; NP_001349573; NP_001349574; NP_001365724; NP_001394210
Location (UCSC)	Chr 20: 45.42 – 45.46 Mb	Chr 2: 164.34 – 164.35 Mb
PubMed search
- Wikidata
View/Edit Human	View/Edit Mouse

GPI transamidase component PIG-T is an enzyme that in humans is encoded by the PIGT gene.

This gene encodes a protein that is involved in glycosylphosphatidylinositol (GPI)-anchor biosynthesis. The GPI-anchor is a glycolipid found on many blood cells and serves to anchor proteins to the cell surface. This protein is an essential component of the multisubunit enzyme, GPI transamidase. GPI transamidase mediates GPI anchoring in the endoplasmic reticulum, by catalyzing the transfer of fully assembled GPI units to proteins.

== Interactions ==
PIGT has been shown to interact with PIGK and GPAA1.
