= Glycoside hydrolase family 101 =

Family of glycoside hydrolases

Endo-alpha-N-acetylgalactosaminidase

Identifiers
- Symbol: Glyco_hydro_101
- Pfam: PF12905
- Pfam clan: CL0058
- CAZy: GH101
- CDD: cd14244
Available protein structures:
- PDB: PF12905 (ECOD; PDBsum)
- AlphaFold: PF12905

Glycoside hydrolases related to GH101 family

Identifiers
- Symbol: GHL
- Pfam: PF11308
- Pfam clan: CL0058
Available protein structures:
- PDB: PF11308 (ECOD; PDBsum)
- AlphaFold: PF11308

In molecular biology, glycoside hydrolase family 101 is a family of glycoside hydrolases.

Glycoside hydrolases EC 3.2.1. are a widespread group of enzymes that hydrolyse the glycosidic bond between two or more carbohydrates, or between a carbohydrate and a non-carbohydrate moiety. A classification system for glycoside hydrolases, based on sequence similarity, has led to the definition of >100 different families. This classification is available on the CAZy web site, and also discussed at CAZypedia, an online encyclopedia of carbohydrate active enzymes.

Glycoside hydrolase family GH101 includes enzymes with endo-α-N-acetylgalactosaminidase EC 3.2.1.97 activity and can be split into several subfamilies.
