= GPAA1 =

Protein-coding gene in the species Homo sapiens

Identifiers
- Aliases: GPAA1, GAA1, hGAA1, glycosylphosphatidylinositol anchor attachment 1, GPIBD15
- External IDs: OMIM: 603048; MGI: 1202392; HomoloGene: 37852; GeneCards: GPAA1; OMA:GPAA1 - orthologs

Gene location (Human)
Chr.	Chromosome 8 (human)
Band	8q24.3	Start	144,082,590 bp
Band	8q24.3	End	144,086,216 bp

Gene location (Mouse)
Chr.	Chromosome 15 (mouse)
Band	15|15 D3	Start	76,215,431 bp
Band	15|15 D3	End	76,219,107 bp
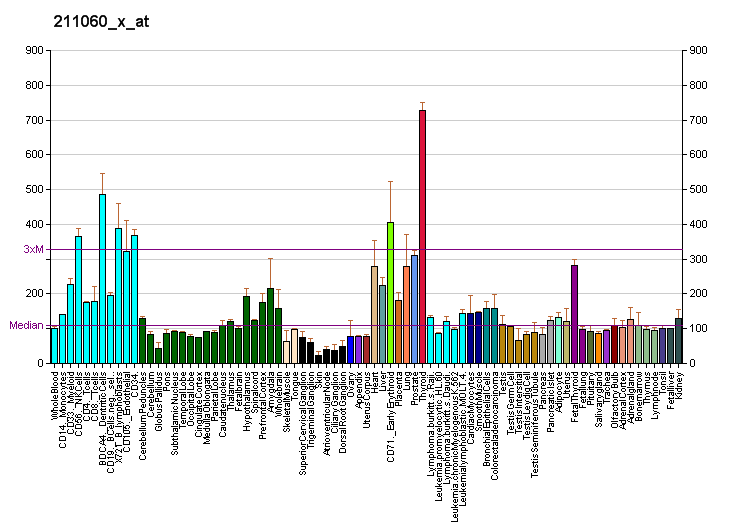

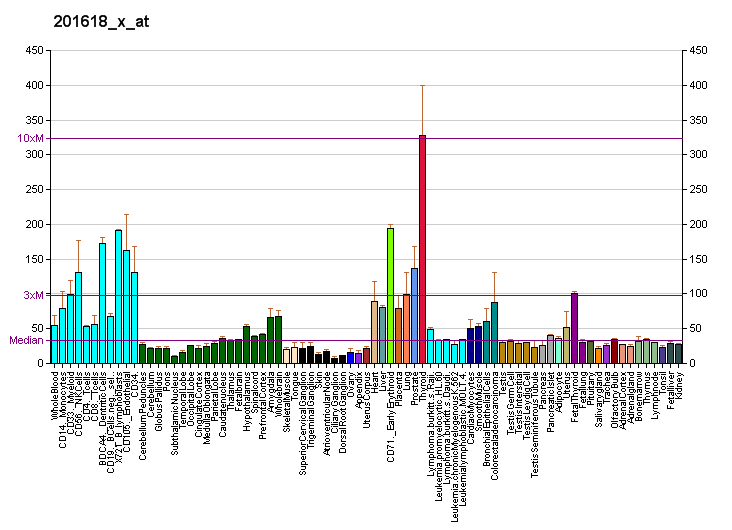

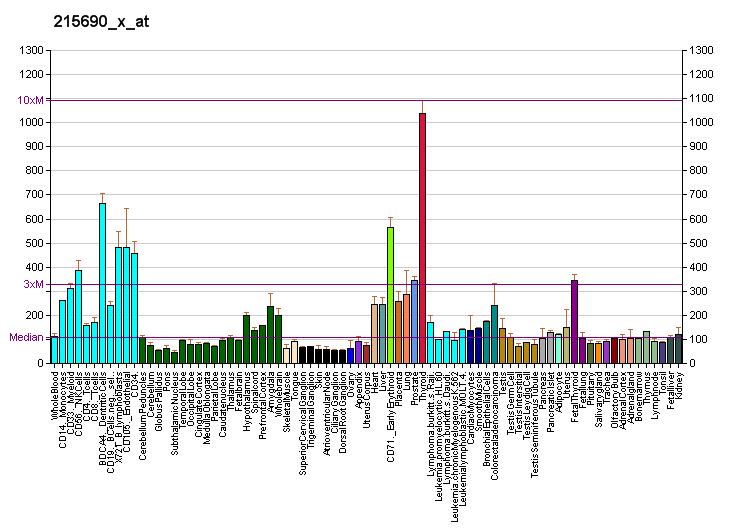
RNA expression pattern
Bgee	Human / Mouse (ortholog); Top expressed in: stromal cell of endometrium; right lobe of thyroid gland; apex of heart; left lobe of thyroid gland; right adrenal gland; left adrenal gland; right adrenal cortex; mucosa of transverse colon; left adrenal cortex; body of stomach / Top expressed in: right kidney; lip; granulocyte; neural layer of retina; muscle of thigh; yolk sac; primary visual cortex; superior frontal gyrus; ventricular zone; proximal tubule; More reference expression data
BioGPS	More reference expression data
Gene ontology
Molecular function	tubulin binding; GPI-anchor transamidase activity; GPI anchor binding; protein binding
Cellular component	integral component of membrane; endoplasmic reticulum membrane; GPI-anchor transamidase complex; endoplasmic reticulum; membrane
Biological process	protein retention in ER lumen; GPI anchor biosynthetic process; attachment of GPI anchor to protein; protein-containing complex assembly
Sources:Amigo / QuickGO
Orthologs
Species	Human	Mouse
Entrez	8733	14731
Ensembl	ENSG00000197858	ENSMUSG00000022561
UniProt	O43292	Q9WTK3
RefSeq (mRNA)	NM_003801	NM_010331
RefSeq (protein)	NP_003792	NP_034461
Location (UCSC)	Chr 8: 144.08 – 144.09 Mb	Chr 15: 76.22 – 76.22 Mb
PubMed search
- Wikidata
View/Edit Human	View/Edit Mouse

Glycosylphosphatidylinositol anchor attachment 1 protein is a protein that in humans is encoded by the GPAA1 gene.

Posttranslational glycosylphosphatidylinositol (GPI) anchor attachment serves as a general mechanism for linking proteins to the cell surface membrane. The protein encoded by this gene presumably functions in GPI anchoring at the GPI transfer step. The mRNA transcript is ubiquitously expressed in both fetal and adult tissues. The anchor attachment protein 1 contains an N-terminal signal sequence, 1 cAMP- and cGMP-dependent protein kinase phosphorylation site, 1 leucine zipper pattern, 2 potential N-glycosylation sites, and 8 putative transmembrane domains.

== Interactions ==
GPAA1 has been shown to interact with PIGT and PIGK.
