= Hyperphosphatasia with mental retardation syndrome =

- Other names: Mabry syndrome, Hyperphosphatasia with intellectual disability syndrome, Hyperphosphatasia with impaired intellectual development syndrome
- This condition is inherited in an autosomal recessive manner

Hyperphosphatasia with mental retardation syndrome, HPMRS, also known as Mabry syndrome, has been described in patients recruited on four continents world-wide. Mabry syndrome was confirmed to represent an autosomal recessive syndrome characterized by severe mental retardation, considerably elevated serum levels of alkaline phosphatase, hypoplastic terminal phalanges, and distinct facial features that include: hypertelorism, a broad nasal bridge and a rectangular face.

== Pathogenesis ==
While many cases of HPMRS are caused by mutations in the PIGV gene, there may be genetic heterogeneity in the spectrum of Mabry syndrome as a whole. PIGV is a member of the molecular pathway that synthesizes the glycosylphosphatidylinositol anchor. The loss in PIGV activity results in a reduced anchoring of alkaline phosphatase to the surface membrane and an elevated alkaline phosphatase activity in the serum.

== Diagnosis ==
The clinical diagnosis can be established if the patient has repeatedly elevated levels of alkaline phosphatase activity in the blood serum and exhibits intellectual disability. Supportive for the clinical diagnosis are epilepsies, brachydactyly and a characteristic facial gestalt, which can also be assessed by means of AI. The clinical diagnosis can be confirmed by molecular testing such as exome sequencing.

== Treatment ==
So far, no effective treatment is available for HPMRS. A mouse model that mirrors the human phenotype has been engineered by CRISPR technology and is available for compound screening.
