= PIGB =

Protein-coding gene in the species Homo sapiens

Identifiers
- Aliases: PIGB, GPI-MT-III, PIG-B, phosphatidylinositol glycan anchor biosynthesis class B, EIEE80, DEE80
- External IDs: OMIM: 604122; MGI: 1891825; GeneCards: PIGB

Gene location (Human)
Chr.	Chromosome 15 (human)
Band	15q21.3	Start	55,318,960 bp
Band	15q21.3	End	55,355,648 bp

Gene location (Mouse)
Chr.	Chromosome 9 (mouse)
Band	9|9 D	Start	72,914,701 bp
Band	9|9 D	End	72,947,660 bp
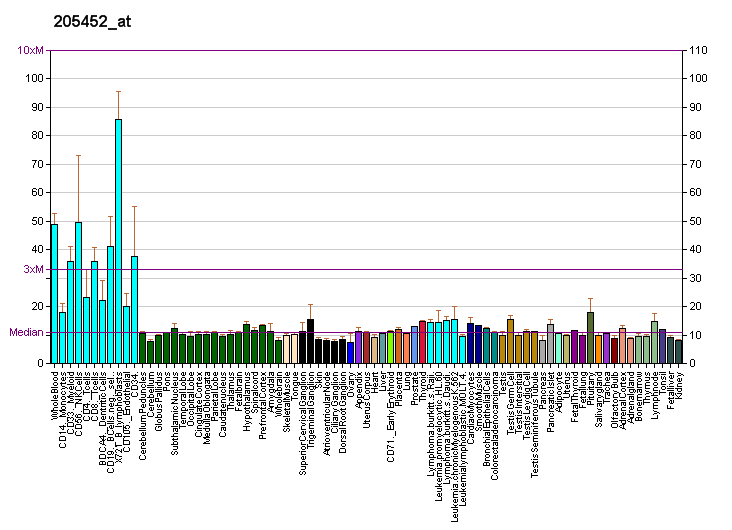
RNA expression pattern
Bgee	Human / Mouse (ortholog); Top expressed in: granulocyte; blood; Achilles tendon; monocyte; anterior pituitary; left lobe of thyroid gland; right lobe of thyroid gland; body of pancreas; gastric mucosa; spleen / Top expressed in: ascending aorta; aortic valve; granulocyte; tail of embryo; genital tubercle; neural layer of retina; dentate gyrus of hippocampal formation granule cell; supraoptic nucleus; right kidney; zygote; More reference expression data
BioGPS	More reference expression data
Gene ontology
Molecular function	transferase activity; mannosyltransferase activity; glycosyltransferase activity; glycolipid mannosyltransferase activity
Cellular component	integral component of membrane; endoplasmic reticulum membrane; endoplasmic reticulum; membrane
Biological process	GPI anchor biosynthetic process; preassembly of GPI anchor in ER membrane; mannosylation
Sources:Amigo / QuickGO
Orthologs
Databases	NCBI: entry; OMA: entry
Species	Human	Mouse
Entrez	9488	55981
Ensembl	ENSG00000069943	ENSMUSG00000079469
UniProt	Q92521	Q9JJQ0
RefSeq (mRNA)	NM_004855	NM_018889
RefSeq (protein)	NP_004846	NP_061377
Location (UCSC)	Chr 15: 55.32 – 55.36 Mb	Chr 9: 72.91 – 72.95 Mb
PubMed search
- Wikidata
View/Edit Human	View/Edit Mouse

GPI mannosyltransferase 3 is an enzyme that in humans is encoded by the PIGB gene.

This gene encodes a transmembrane protein that is located in the endoplasmic reticulum and is involved in GPI-anchor biosynthesis. The glycosylphosphatidylinositol (GPI) anchor is a glycolipid found on many blood cells and serves to anchor proteins to the cell surface. This gene is thought to encode a member of a family of dolichol-phosphate-mannose (Dol-P-Man) dependent mannosyltransferases.
