= TMEM229B =

Gene of the species Homo sapiens

Identifiers
- Aliases: TMEM229B, C14orf83, transmembrane protein 229B
- External IDs: MGI: 2444389; HomoloGene: 18700; GeneCards: TMEM229B; OMA:TMEM229B - orthologs

Gene location (Mouse)
Chr.	Chromosome 12 (mouse)
Band	12|12 C3	Start	79,008,569 bp
Band	12|12 C3	End	79,054,401 bp
Orthologs
Species	Human	Mouse
Entrez	161145	268567
Ensembl	ENSG00000198133	ENSMUSG00000046157
UniProt	Q8NBD8	Q8BFQ2
RefSeq (mRNA)	NM_182526	NM_001170401; NM_178745; NM_001364891; NM_001364892
RefSeq (protein)	NP_872332; NP_001335470; NP_001335471; NP_001335472; NP_001335473 NP_001335475; NP_001335476; NP_001335477; NP_001335478	NP_001163872; NP_848860; NP_001351820; NP_001351821
Location (UCSC)	n/a	Chr 12: 79.01 – 79.05 Mb
PubMed search
- Wikidata
View/Edit Human	View/Edit Mouse

Transmembrane protein 229b is a protein that in humans is encoded by the TMEM229b gene.

== Nomenclature ==
The TMEM229B gene is also known as C14orf83, FLJ33387, Q8NBD8, Hs.509707, Hs.712258, IPR010540, and CN083_HUMAN.

== Gene ==
The TMEM229B gene is located on the sense strand (-) of chromosome 14 at location 14q24.1 and spans the chromosomal locus 67,936,983—67,982,021. Covering a total of 45,038 base pairs (bp) along the chromosome, the TMEM229B gene has a total of 3 exons in its primary unspliced transcript mRNA of 4,068 bp. There are a total of 7 transcript variants for TMEM229B ranging in mRNA size from 519 bp to 5008 bp. The TMEM229B gene is flanked by phosphatidylinositol glycan anchor class H (PIGH), a protein associated with the endoplasmic reticulum specifically GPI-anchor biosynthesis, and PLEK2 on its left. See Figure 1.0. The gene is highly conserved in vertebrates, including portions of the approximately 3,000 base pairs of 3'UTR.

== Tissue distribution ==
Expressed sequence tag mapping of TMEM229B gene expression indicates that it is ubiquitously expressed throughout the body. TMEM229B is more heavily expressed in the parathyroid, skin, and thyroid tissues, and moderately expressed in bone marrow, trachea, spleen, eye, brain, pancreas, mammary gland, intestine, liver, thymus, lymph node, ovarian, muscle, lung, blood, and kidney tissues.

== Protein ==
The translated TMEM229B protein is a total of 167 amino acids long, with a predicted molecular weight of 19,531 daltons. The TMEM229B protein contains a domain of unknown function, part of the domain family DUF1113, spanning from amino acids 87 to 135.

Based on predicted structure TMEM229b is highly resemblant of a connexin subunit. A highly conserved phosphorylation site exists at the Threonine-139 position. See multiple sequence alignment below.

Annotated diagram of the TMEM229b gene (with its 3 exons), mature mRNA and protein domains. Functional peptide is predicted to take the form of a connexin 4-pass transmembrane subunit (seen below).

== Clinical relevance ==
Expression of the TMEM229B gene increases in several disease states including amelanotic skin melanoma, B-cell neoplasm, breast carcinoma, Burkitt's lymphoma, colorectal adenocarcinoma, carcinoma, cutaneous T cell lymphoma, esophageal carcinoma, gastric carcinoma, glioblastoma, liver carcinoma, lymphoma, melanoma, small cell lung carcinoma, T-cell acute lymphoblastic leukemia, thyroid carcinoma and Wilms' tumor as found in several microarray experiments. Over-expression of the TMEM229B gene has not been linked as a causal factor in any of these disease states.
