= PIGW =

Protein-coding gene in the species Homo sapiens

Identifiers
- Aliases: PIGW, Gwt1, HPMRS5, phosphatidylinositol glycan anchor biosynthesis class W
- External IDs: OMIM: 610275; MGI: 1917575; HomoloGene: 6243; GeneCards: PIGW; OMA:PIGW - orthologs

Gene location (Human)
Chr.	Chromosome 17 (human)
Band	17q12	Start	36,534,987 bp
Band	17q12	End	36,539,310 bp

Gene location (Mouse)
Chr.	Chromosome 11 (mouse)
Band	11|11 C	Start	84,767,141 bp
Band	11|11 C	End	84,771,111 bp
RNA expression pattern
Bgee	Human / Mouse (ortholog); Top expressed in: islet of Langerhans; endometrium; gastrocnemius muscle; testicle; appendix; rectum; skeletal muscle tissue; mucosa of esophagus; lymph node; gonad / Top expressed in: epiblast; lens; quadriceps femoris muscle; hepatobiliary system; liver; muscle of thigh; white adipose tissue; ileum; yolk sac; tail of embryo; More reference expression data
BioGPS	n/a
Gene ontology
Molecular function	acyltransferase activity; transferase activity; O-acyltransferase activity; glucosaminyl-phosphatidylinositol O-acyltransferase activity
Cellular component	membrane; endoplasmic reticulum membrane; integral component of membrane; endoplasmic reticulum
Biological process	GPI anchor biosynthetic process; GPI anchor metabolic process; protein localization to plasma membrane; preassembly of GPI anchor in ER membrane
Sources:Amigo / QuickGO
Orthologs
Species	Human	Mouse
Entrez	284098	70325
Ensembl	ENSG00000275600; ENSG00000277161	ENSMUSG00000045140
UniProt	Q7Z7B1	Q8C398
RefSeq (mRNA)	NM_178517; NM_001346754; NM_001346755	NM_001077636; NM_027388; NM_001363112
RefSeq (protein)	NP_001333683; NP_001333684; NP_848612	NP_001071104; NP_081664; NP_001350041
Location (UCSC)	Chr 17: 36.53 – 36.54 Mb	Chr 11: 84.77 – 84.77 Mb
PubMed search
- Wikidata
View/Edit Human	View/Edit Mouse

Phosphatidylinositol glycan anchor biosynthesis class W is a protein that in humans is encoded by the PIGW gene.

== Function ==
Glycosylphosphatidylinositol (GPI) is a complex glycolipid that anchors many proteins to the cell surface. PIGW acts in the third step of GPI biosynthesis and acylates the inositol ring of phosphatidylinositol (Murakami et al., 2003 [PubMed 14517336]).
