= PIGC =

Enzyme

Identifiers
- Aliases: PIGC, GPI2, phosphatidylinositol glycan anchor biosynthesis class C, MRT62, GPIBD16
- External IDs: OMIM: 601730; MGI: 1914542; HomoloGene: 7109; GeneCards: PIGC; OMA:PIGC - orthologs

Gene location (Human)
Chr.	Chromosome 1 (human)
Band	1q24.3	Start	172,370,189 bp
Band	1q24.3	End	172,444,086 bp

Gene location (Mouse)
Chr.	Chromosome 1 (mouse)
Band	1|1 H2.1	Start	161,796,755 bp
Band	1|1 H2.1	End	161,801,004 bp
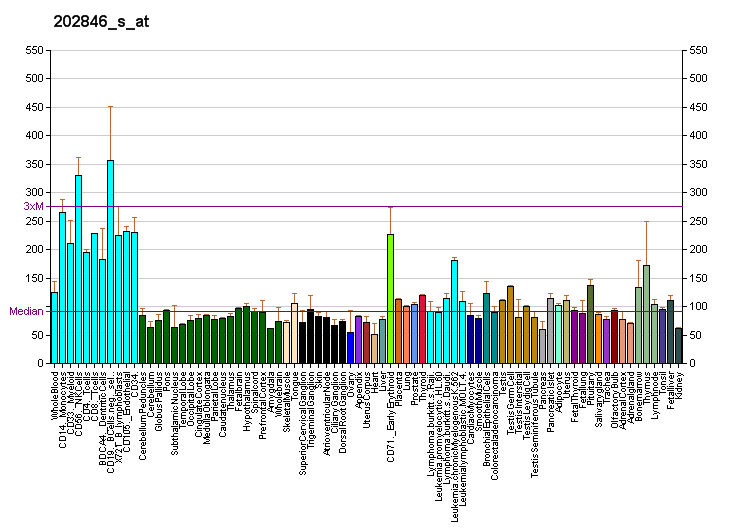

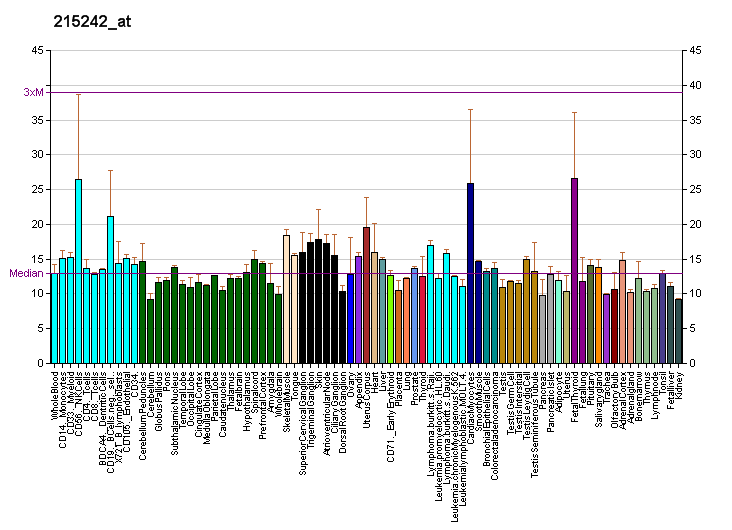

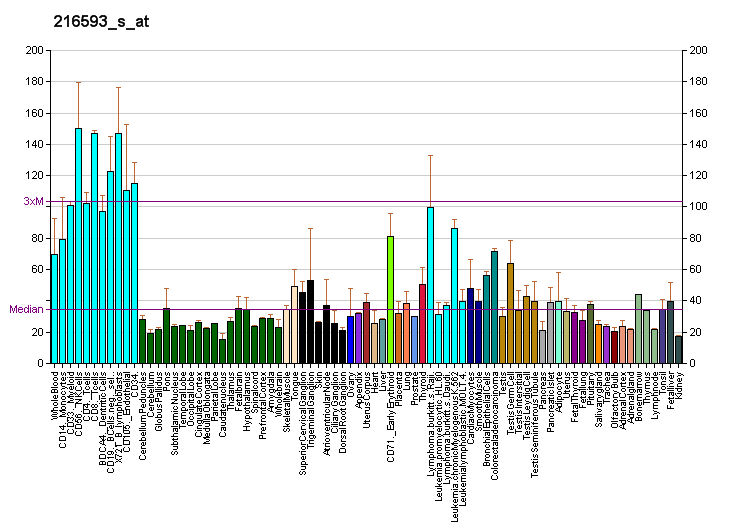
RNA expression pattern
Bgee	Human / Mouse (ortholog); Top expressed in: Achilles tendon; skin of leg; skin of abdomen; islet of Langerhans; monocyte; skin of thigh; nipple; body of pancreas; bone marrow; hair follicle / Top expressed in: seminal vesicula; cornea; renal corpuscle; calvaria; epithelium of lens; temporal muscle; upper arm; molar; primary oocyte; triceps brachii muscle; More reference expression data
BioGPS	More reference expression data
Gene ontology
Molecular function	transferase activity; phosphatidylinositol N-acetylglucosaminyltransferase activity; catalytic activity; glycosyltransferase activity
Cellular component	integral component of membrane; endoplasmic reticulum membrane; glycosylphosphatidylinositol-N-acetylglucosaminyltransferase (GPI-GnT) complex; endoplasmic reticulum; membrane
Biological process	GPI anchor biosynthetic process; preassembly of GPI anchor in ER membrane
Sources:Amigo / QuickGO
Orthologs
Species	Human	Mouse
Entrez	5279	67292
Ensembl	ENSG00000135845	ENSMUSG00000026698
UniProt	Q92535	Q9CXR4
RefSeq (mRNA)	NM_153747; NM_002642	NM_001039045; NM_026078
RefSeq (protein)	NP_002633; NP_714969	NP_001034134; NP_080354
Location (UCSC)	Chr 1: 172.37 – 172.44 Mb	Chr 1: 161.8 – 161.8 Mb
PubMed search
- Wikidata
View/Edit Human	View/Edit Mouse

Phosphatidylinositol N-acetylglucosaminyltransferase subunit C is an enzyme that in humans is encoded by the PIGC gene.

This gene encodes an endoplasmic reticulum associated protein that is involved in glycosylphosphatidylinositol (GPI) lipid anchor biosynthesis. The GPI lipid anchor is a glycolipid found on many blood cells and serves to anchor proteins to the cell surface. The encoded protein is one subunit of the GPI N-acetylglucosaminyl (GlcNAc) transferase that transfers GlcNAc to phosphatidylinositol (PI) on the cytoplasmic side of the endoplasmic reticulum. Two alternatively spliced transcripts that encode the same protein have been found for this gene. A pseudogene on chromosome 11 has also been characterized.

== Interactions ==
PIGC has been shown to interact with PIGQ.
