= PIGQ =

Protein-coding gene in the species Homo sapiens

Identifiers
- Aliases: PIGQ, GPI1, c407A10.1, phosphatidylinositol glycan anchor biosynthesis class Q, EIEE77, DEE77, MCAHS4, GPIBD19
- External IDs: OMIM: 605754; MGI: 1333114; HomoloGene: 31228; GeneCards: PIGQ; OMA:PIGQ - orthologs

Gene location (Human)
Chr.	Chromosome 16 (human)
Band	16p13.3	Start	566,995 bp
Band	16p13.3	End	584,109 bp

Gene location (Mouse)
Chr.	Chromosome 17 (mouse)
Band	17|17 A3.3	Start	26,145,395 bp
Band	17|17 A3.3	End	26,163,910 bp
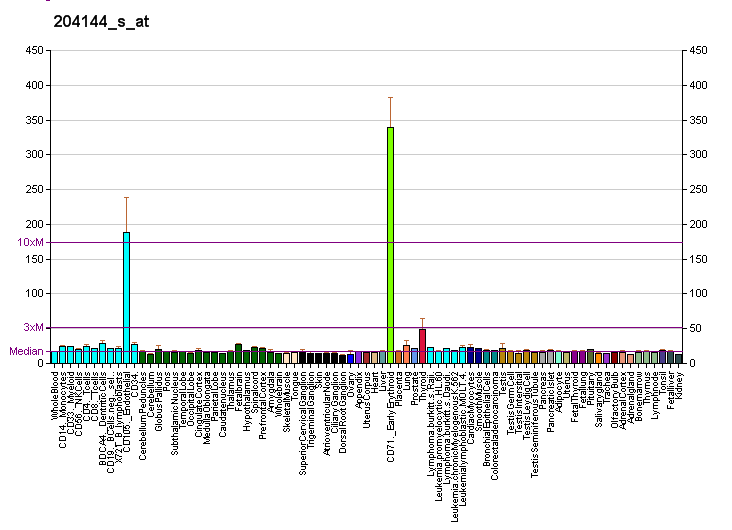
RNA expression pattern
Bgee	Human / Mouse (ortholog); Top expressed in: right lobe of thyroid gland; right uterine tube; left lobe of thyroid gland; right testis; anterior pituitary; left testis; right frontal lobe; body of pancreas; right hemisphere of cerebellum; right adrenal cortex / Top expressed in: fetal liver hematopoietic progenitor cell; motor neuron; substantia nigra; fossa; ciliary body; endocardial cushion; barrel cortex; medullary collecting duct; ascending aorta; crypt of lieberkuhn of small intestine; More reference expression data
BioGPS	More reference expression data
Gene ontology
Molecular function	transferase activity; phosphatidylinositol N-acetylglucosaminyltransferase activity; glycosyltransferase activity
Cellular component	integral component of membrane; endoplasmic reticulum membrane; glycosylphosphatidylinositol-N-acetylglucosaminyltransferase (GPI-GnT) complex; membrane
Biological process	GPI anchor biosynthetic process; preassembly of GPI anchor in ER membrane; carbohydrate metabolic process
Sources:Amigo / QuickGO
Orthologs
Species	Human	Mouse
Entrez	9091	14755
Ensembl	ENSG00000007541	ENSMUSG00000025728
UniProt	Q9BRB3	Q9QYT7
RefSeq (mRNA)	NM_148920; NM_004204	NM_001291025; NM_011822; NM_001357592
RefSeq (protein)	NP_004195; NP_683721	NP_001277954; NP_035952; NP_001344521
Location (UCSC)	Chr 16: 0.57 – 0.58 Mb	Chr 17: 26.15 – 26.16 Mb
PubMed search
- Wikidata
View/Edit Human	View/Edit Mouse

Phosphatidylinositol N-acetylglucosaminyltransferase subunit Q is an enzyme that in humans is encoded by the PIGQ gene.

This gene is involved in the first step in glycosylphosphatidylinositol (GPI)-anchor biosynthesis. The GPI-anchor is a glycolipid found on many blood cells and serves to anchor proteins to the cell surface. This gene encodes a N-acetylglucosaminyl transferase component that is part of the complex that catalyzes transfer of N-acetylglucosamine (GlcNAc) from UDP-GlcNAc to phosphatidylinositol (PI).

== Interactions ==
PIGQ has been shown to interact with PIGH, PIGA and PIGC.
