= PIGK =

Protein-coding gene in humans

Identifiers
- Aliases: PIGK, GPI8, phosphatidylinositol glycan anchor biosynthesis class K, NEDHCAS
- External IDs: OMIM: 605087; MGI: 1913863; GeneCards: PIGK

Gene location (Human)
Chr.	Chromosome 1 (human)
Band	1p31.1	Start	77,088,989 bp
Band	1p31.1	End	77,219,430 bp

Gene location (Mouse)
Chr.	Chromosome 3 (mouse)
Band	3|3 H3	Start	152,714,100 bp
Band	3|3 H3	End	152,980,408 bp
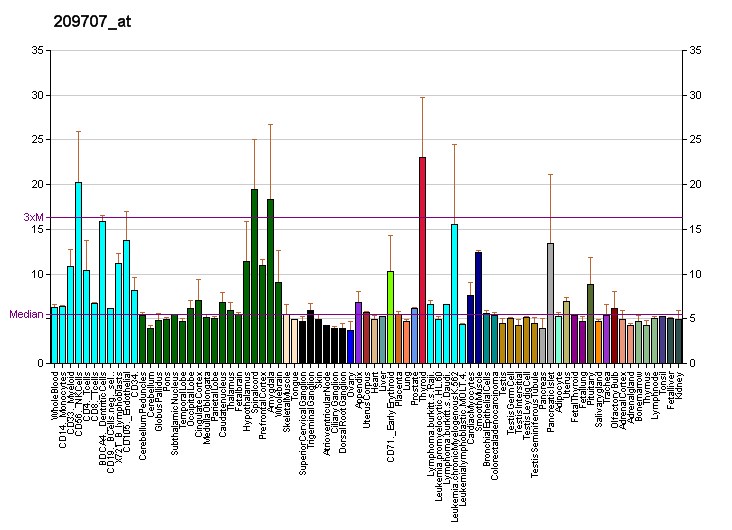
RNA expression pattern
Bgee	Human / Mouse (ortholog); Top expressed in: endothelial cell; Achilles tendon; stromal cell of endometrium; islet of Langerhans; retinal pigment epithelium; right coronary artery; right ventricle; kidney tubule; glomerulus; popliteal artery / Top expressed in: spermatocyte; spermatid; cingulate gyrus; Ileal epithelium; extensor digitorum longus muscle; cardiac muscle tissue of left ventricle; plantaris muscle; supraoptic nucleus; calvaria; decidua; More reference expression data
BioGPS	More reference expression data
Gene ontology
Molecular function	GPI-anchor transamidase activity; peptidase activity; cysteine-type peptidase activity; GPI anchor binding; protein binding; hydrolase activity; protein disulfide isomerase activity
Cellular component	integral component of membrane; integral component of endoplasmic reticulum membrane; endoplasmic reticulum membrane; membrane; GPI-anchor transamidase complex; endoplasmic reticulum
Biological process	GPI anchor biosynthetic process; attachment of GPI anchor to protein; protein localization to cell surface; proteolysis
Sources:Amigo / QuickGO
Orthologs
Databases	NCBI: entry; OMA: entry
Species	Human	Mouse
Entrez	10026	329777
Ensembl	ENSG00000142892	ENSMUSG00000039047
UniProt	Q92643	Q9CXY9
RefSeq (mRNA)	NM_005482	NM_025662; NM_178016
RefSeq (protein)	NP_005473	NP_079938; NP_821135
Location (UCSC)	Chr 1: 77.09 – 77.22 Mb	Chr 3: 152.71 – 152.98 Mb
PubMed search
- Wikidata
View/Edit Human	View/Edit Mouse

GPI-anchor transamidase is an enzyme that in humans is encoded by the PIGK gene.

This gene encodes a member of the cysteine protease family C13 that is involved in glycosylphosphatidylinositol (GPI)-anchor biosynthesis. The GPI-anchor is a glycolipid found on many blood cells and serves to anchor proteins to the cell surface. This protein is a member of the multisubunit enzyme GPI transamidase and is thought to be its enzymatic component. GPI transamidase mediates GPI anchoring in the endoplasmic reticulum, by catalyzing the transfer of fully assembled GPI units to proteins.

== Interactions ==
PIGK has been shown to interact with PIGT and GPAA1.
