= PIGV =

Protein-coding gene in humans

Identifiers
- Aliases: PIGV, GPI-MT-II, HPMRS1, PIG-V, phosphatidylinositol glycan anchor biosynthesis class V
- External IDs: OMIM: 610274; MGI: 2442480; GeneCards: PIGV

Gene location (Human)
Chr.	Chromosome 1 (human)
Band	1p36.11	Start	26,787,472 bp
Band	1p36.11	End	26,798,398 bp

Gene location (Mouse)
Chr.	Chromosome 4 (mouse)
Band	4|4 D2.3	Start	133,387,698 bp
Band	4|4 D2.3	End	133,399,958 bp
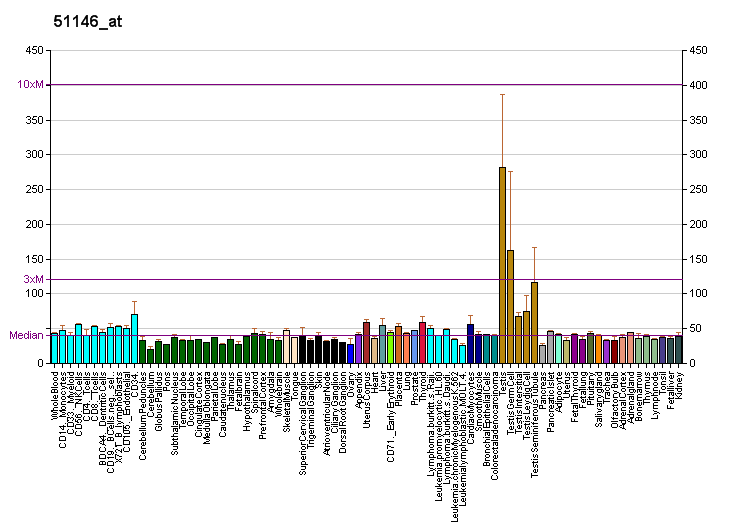

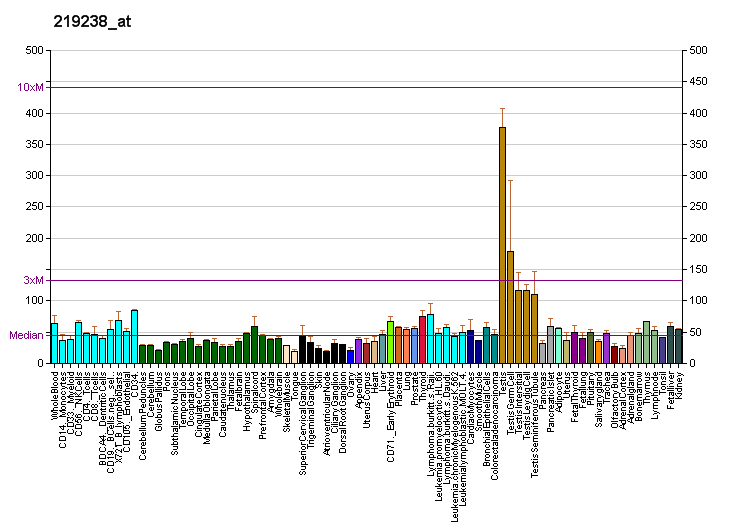
RNA expression pattern
Bgee	Human / Mouse (ortholog); Top expressed in: sperm; oocyte; right testis; left testis; germinal epithelium; bronchial epithelial cell; secondary oocyte; gonad; parotid gland; kidney tubule / Top expressed in: otic vesicle; granulocyte; interventricular septum; ascending aorta; aortic valve; spermatocyte; yolk sac; right kidney; muscle of thigh; hand; More reference expression data
BioGPS	More reference expression data
Gene ontology
Molecular function	mannosyltransferase activity; glycosyltransferase activity; transferase activity; glycolipid mannosyltransferase activity
Cellular component	membrane; mannosyltransferase complex; endoplasmic reticulum; integral component of membrane; endoplasmic reticulum membrane
Biological process	GPI anchor biosynthetic process; preassembly of GPI anchor in ER membrane; mannosylation
Sources:Amigo / QuickGO
Orthologs
Databases	NCBI: entry; OMA: entry
Species	Human	Mouse
Entrez	55650	230801
Ensembl	ENSG00000060642	ENSMUSG00000043257
UniProt	Q9NUD9	Q7TPN3
RefSeq (mRNA)	NM_017837; NM_001202554	NM_001145955; NM_001145956; NM_178698; NM_001356466
RefSeq (protein)	NP_001189483; NP_060307; NP_001361407; NP_001361409; NP_001361410 NP_001361411; NP_001361412; NP_001361413; NP_001361414; NP_001361415	NP_001139427; NP_001139428; NP_848813; NP_001343395
Location (UCSC)	Chr 1: 26.79 – 26.8 Mb	Chr 4: 133.39 – 133.4 Mb
PubMed search
- Wikidata
View/Edit Human	View/Edit Mouse

GPI mannosyltransferase 2 is an enzyme that in humans is encoded by the PIGV gene.

== See also ==
- Hyperphosphatasia with mental retardation syndrome (HPMRS)
