= PIGH =

Protein-coding gene in the species Homo sapiens

Identifiers
- Aliases: PIGH, GPI-H, phosphatidylinositol glycan anchor biosynthesis class H
- External IDs: OMIM: 600154; MGI: 99463; HomoloGene: 3361; GeneCards: PIGH; OMA:PIGH - orthologs

Gene location (Human)
Chr.	Chromosome 14 (human)
Band	14q24.1	Start	67,581,955 bp
Band	14q24.1	End	67,600,286 bp

Gene location (Mouse)
Chr.	Chromosome 12 (mouse)
Band	12 C3|12 35.51 cM	Start	79,127,438 bp
Band	12 C3|12 35.51 cM	End	79,136,425 bp
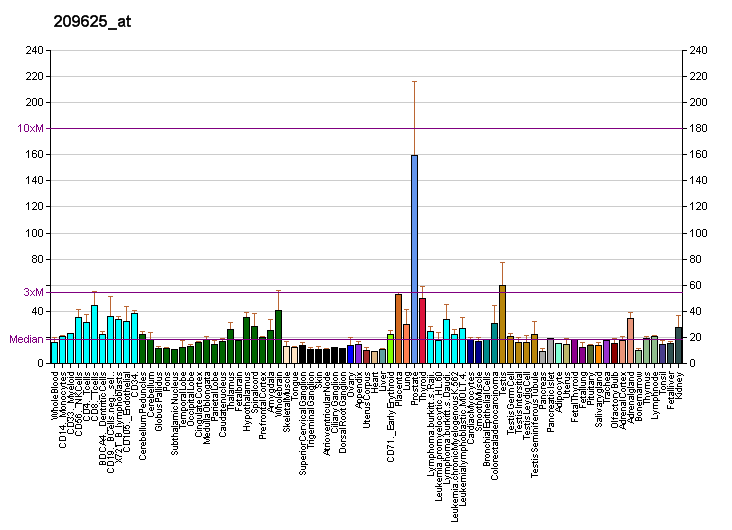
RNA expression pattern
Bgee	Human / Mouse (ortholog); Top expressed in: body of pancreas; left lobe of thyroid gland; right adrenal gland; left adrenal gland; right adrenal cortex; left adrenal cortex; right lobe of thyroid gland; left ovary; minor salivary glands; right ovary / Top expressed in: Paneth cell; transitional epithelium of urinary bladder; seminal vesicula; conjunctival fornix; condyle; epithelium of lens; fossa; renal corpuscle; medullary collecting duct; lobe of prostate; More reference expression data
BioGPS	More reference expression data
Gene ontology
Molecular function	transferase activity; phosphatidylinositol N-acetylglucosaminyltransferase activity; catalytic activity; glycosyltransferase activity
Cellular component	cytoplasm; endoplasmic reticulum membrane; glycosylphosphatidylinositol-N-acetylglucosaminyltransferase (GPI-GnT) complex; endoplasmic reticulum; membrane; integral component of membrane
Biological process	GPI anchor biosynthetic process; preassembly of GPI anchor in ER membrane; metabolism
Sources:Amigo / QuickGO
Orthologs
Species	Human	Mouse
Entrez	5283	110417
Ensembl	ENSG00000100564	ENSMUSG00000021120
UniProt	Q14442	Q5M9N4
RefSeq (mRNA)	NM_004569; NM_001363694	NM_029988
RefSeq (protein)	NP_004560; NP_001350623	NP_084264
Location (UCSC)	Chr 14: 67.58 – 67.6 Mb	Chr 12: 79.13 – 79.14 Mb
PubMed search
- Wikidata
View/Edit Human	View/Edit Mouse

Phosphatidylinositol N-acetylglucosaminyltransferase subunit H is an enzyme that in humans is encoded by the PIGH gene. The PIGH gene is located on the reverse strand of chromosome 14 in humans, and is neighbored by TMEM229B.

This gene encodes an endoplasmic reticulum associated protein that is involved in glycosylphosphatidylinositol (GPI)-anchor biosynthesis. The GPI anchor is a glycolipid found on many blood cells and which serves to anchor proteins to the cell surface. The protein encoded by this gene is a subunit of the GPI N-acetylglucosaminyl (GlcNAc) transferase that transfers GlcNAc to phosphatidylinositol (PI) on the cytoplasmic side of the endoplasmic reticulum.

== Interactions ==
PIGH has been shown to interact with PIGQ.
