= PIGA =

Protein-coding gene in the species Homo sapiens

Identifiers
- Aliases: PIGA, GPI3, MCAHS2, PIG-A, PNH1, phosphatidylinositol glycan anchor biosynthesis class A, NEDEPH
- External IDs: OMIM: 311770; MGI: 99461; GeneCards: PIGA
Enzyme activity
EC #	BRENDA	ExPASy	KEGG	MetaCyc
2.4.1.198	↗	↗	↗	↗

Gene location (Human)
Chr.	X chromosome (human)
Band	Xp22.2	Start	15,319,452 bp
Band	Xp22.2	End	15,335,554 bp

Gene location (Mouse)
Chr.	X chromosome (mouse)
Band	X F5|X 76.49 cM	Start	163,202,783 bp
Band	X F5|X 76.49 cM	End	163,216,912 bp
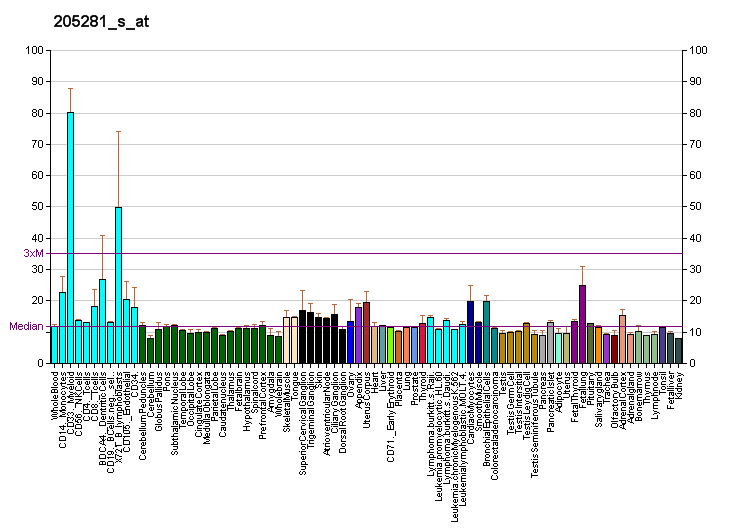
RNA expression pattern
Bgee	Human / Mouse (ortholog); Top expressed in: secondary oocyte; gastric mucosa; mucosa of paranasal sinus; islet of Langerhans; upper lobe of left lung; right lung; Achilles tendon; lower lobe of lung; monocyte; skin of abdomen / Top expressed in: corneal stroma; conjunctival fornix; secondary oocyte; Paneth cell; lumbar subsegment of spinal cord; Ileal epithelium; zygote; migratory enteric neural crest cell; primary oocyte; cumulus cell; More reference expression data
BioGPS	More reference expression data
Gene ontology
Molecular function	transferase activity; phosphatidylinositol N-acetylglucosaminyltransferase activity; UDP-glycosyltransferase activity; protein binding; glycosyltransferase activity
Cellular component	integral component of membrane; endoplasmic reticulum membrane; glycosylphosphatidylinositol-N-acetylglucosaminyltransferase (GPI-GnT) complex; membrane; endoplasmic reticulum
Biological process	GPI anchor biosynthetic process; preassembly of GPI anchor in ER membrane; positive regulation of metabolic process; cellular response to leukemia inhibitory factor
Sources:Amigo / QuickGO
Orthologs
Databases	NCBI: entry; OMA: entry
Species	Human	Mouse
Entrez	5277	18700
Ensembl	ENSG00000165195	ENSMUSG00000031381
UniProt	P37287	Q64323
RefSeq (mRNA)	NM_002641; NM_020472; NM_020473	NM_011081
RefSeq (protein)	NP_002632; NP_065206	NP_035211
Location (UCSC)	Chr X: 15.32 – 15.34 Mb	Chr X: 163.2 – 163.22 Mb
PubMed search
- Wikidata
View/Edit Human	View/Edit Mouse

Phosphatidylinositol N-acetylglucosaminyltransferase subunit A (PIG-A, or phosphatidylinositol glycan, class A) is the catalytic subunit of the phosphatidylinositol N-acetylglucosaminyltransferase enzyme, which in humans is encoded by the PIGA gene.

This gene encodes a protein required for synthesis of N-acetylglucosaminyl phosphatidylinositol (GlcNAc-PI), the first intermediate in the biosynthetic pathway of GPI anchor. The GPI anchor is a glycolipid found on many blood cells and serves to anchor proteins to the cell surface. Paroxysmal nocturnal hemoglobinuria, an acquired hematologic disorder, has been shown to result from somatic mutations in this gene. Alternate splice variants have been characterized.

Multiple Congenital Anomalies-Hypotonia-Seizures syndrome type 2 (MCAHS2), also known as PIGA-CDG or PIGA deficiency, has been shown to result from germline mutations in the PIGA gene.

== Interactions ==
PIGA has been shown for interact with PIGQ.
