= Glycopeptide alpha-N-acetylgalactosaminidase =

Endo-α-N-acetylgalactosaminidase

Identifiers
- EC no.: 3.2.1.97
- CAS no.: 59793-96-3

Databases
- IntEnz: IntEnz view
- BRENDA: BRENDA entry
- ExPASy: NiceZyme view
- KEGG: KEGG entry
- MetaCyc: metabolic pathway
- PRIAM: profile
- PDB structures: RCSB PDB PDBe PDBsum
Search
- PMC: articles
- PubMed: articles
- NCBI: proteins

Endo-α-N-acetylgalactosaminidase (EC 3.2.1.97, endo-α-acetylgalactosaminidase, endo-α-N-acetyl-D-galactosaminidase, mucinaminylserine mucinaminidase, D-galactosyl-3-(N-acetyl-α-D-galactosaminyl)-L-serine mucinaminohydrolase, endo-α-GalNAc-ase, D-galactosyl-N-acetyl-α-D-galactosamine D-galactosyl-N-acetyl-galactosaminohydrolase) is an enzyme with systematic name glycopeptide-D-galactosyl-N-acetyl-α-D-galactosamine D-galactosyl-N-acetyl-galactosaminohydrolase. This enzyme catalyses the following chemical reaction

3-O-beta-D-galactosyl-N-acetyl-alpha-D-galactosaminyl-L-serine-[protein] + H_{2}O $\rightleftharpoons$ 3-O-beta-D-galactosyl-N-acetyl-alpha-D-galactosamine + L-serine-[protein]

The enzyme catalyses the release of Gal-(1->3)-beta-GalNAc alpha-linked to serine or threonine residues of mucin-type glycoproteins.

Glycopeptide α-N-acetylgalactosaminidases belong to family GH101 of glycoside hydrolases.
