= Mucinaminylserine mucinaminidase =

mucinaminylserine mucinaminidase

Identifiers
- EC no.: 3.2.1.110
- CAS no.: 59793-96-3

Databases
- IntEnz: IntEnz view
- BRENDA: BRENDA entry
- ExPASy: NiceZyme view
- KEGG: KEGG entry
- MetaCyc: metabolic pathway
- PRIAM: profile
- PDB structures: RCSB PDB PDBe PDBsum
- Gene Ontology: AmiGO / QuickGO
Search
- PMC: articles
- PubMed: articles
- NCBI: proteins

In enzymology, a mucinaminylserine mucinaminidase (EC 3.2.1.110) is an enzyme that catalyzes the chemical reaction

D-galactosyl-3-(N-acetyl-beta-D-galactosaminyl)-L-serine + H_{2}O $\rightleftharpoons$ D-galactosyl-3-N-acetyl-beta-D-galactosamine + L-serine

Thus, the two substrates of this enzyme are D-galactosyl-3-(N-acetyl-beta-D-galactosaminyl)-L-serine and H_{2}O, whereas its two products are D-galactosyl-3-N-acetyl-beta-D-galactosamine and L-serine.

This enzyme belongs to the family of hydrolases, specifically those glycosidases that hydrolyse O- and S-glycosyl compounds. The systematic name of this enzyme class is D-galactosyl-3-(N-acetyl-beta-D-galactosaminyl)-L-serine mucinaminohydrolase. Other names in common use include endo-alpha-N-acetylgalactosaminidase, and endo-alpha-N-acetyl-D-galactosaminidase.
