= Glycosylphosphatidylinositol =

Phosphoglyceride attached to proteins

GPI synthesis components
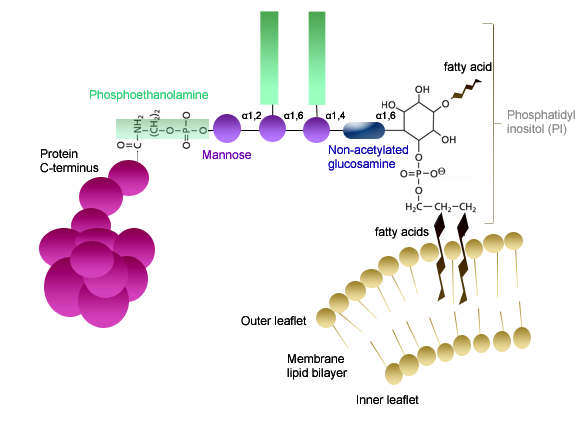
- Structure of the GPI anchor.

Identifiers
- Symbol: GPI
- Membranome: 327

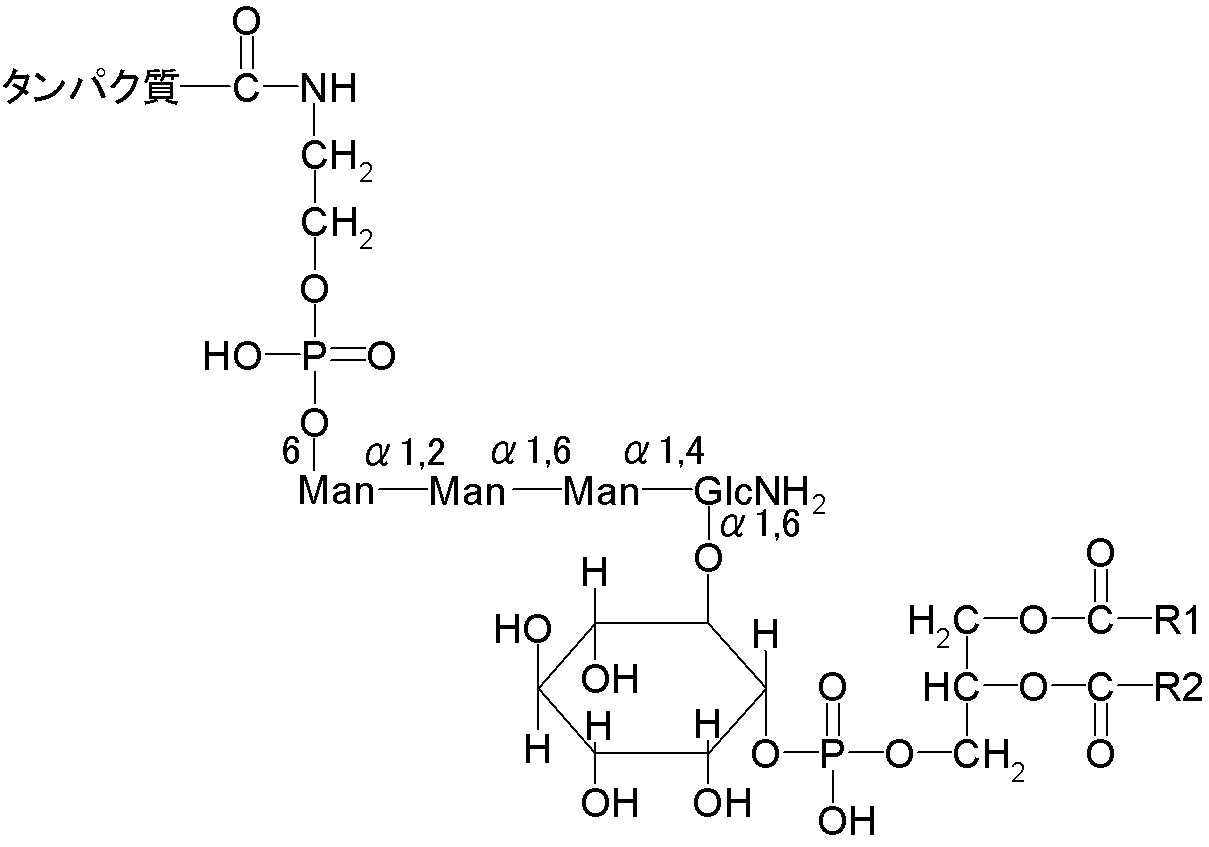
A simpler drawing of a GPI anchor, missing two EtNP bridges on the intermediate mannose groups.

Glycosylphosphatidylinositol or glycophosphatidylinositol (GPI) is a phosphoglyceride that can be attached to the C-terminus of a protein during posttranslational modification. The resulting GPI-anchored proteins play key roles in a wide variety of biological processes. GPI is composed of a phosphatidylinositol group linked through a carbohydrate-containing linker (glucosamine and mannose glycosidically bound to the inositol residue) and via an ethanolamine phosphate (EtNP) bridge to the C-terminal amino acid of a mature protein. The two fatty acids within the hydrophobic phosphatidyl-inositol group anchor the protein to the cell membrane.

== Synthesis ==
Glycosylated (GPI-anchored) proteins contain a signal sequence, thus directing them to the endoplasmic reticulum (ER). The protein is co-translationally inserted in the ER membrane via a translocon and is attached to the ER membrane by its hydrophobic C terminus; the majority of the protein extends into the ER lumen. The hydrophobic C-terminal sequence is then cleaved off and replaced by the GPI-anchor. As the protein processes through the secretory pathway, it is transferred via vesicles to the Golgi apparatus and finally to the plasma membrane where it remains attached to a leaflet of the cell membrane. Since the glypiation is the sole means of attachment of such proteins to the membrane, cleavage of the group by phospholipases will result in controlled release of the protein from the membrane. The latter mechanism is used in vitro; i.e. membrane proteins released from membranes in enzymatic assays are glypiated proteins.

The inositol residue is modified with palmitate or myristate at position 2 prior to mannose and ethanolamine phosphate transfer. This is most often removed soon after addition to the C terminus of a protein in the endoplasmic reticulum; in nucleated cells, only 5 to 10 percent of mature GPI-anchored proteins retain the marker, however, in erythrocytes, the majority of GPI-anchored proteins are acylated with myristate on the anchor. In Trypanosoma brucei, by contrast, mannosyltransferase activity does not require acylation of the inositol residue and consequently unacylated GPI anchors are transferred to the parasite's variant surface glycoprotein.

Steps in the synthesis of GPI

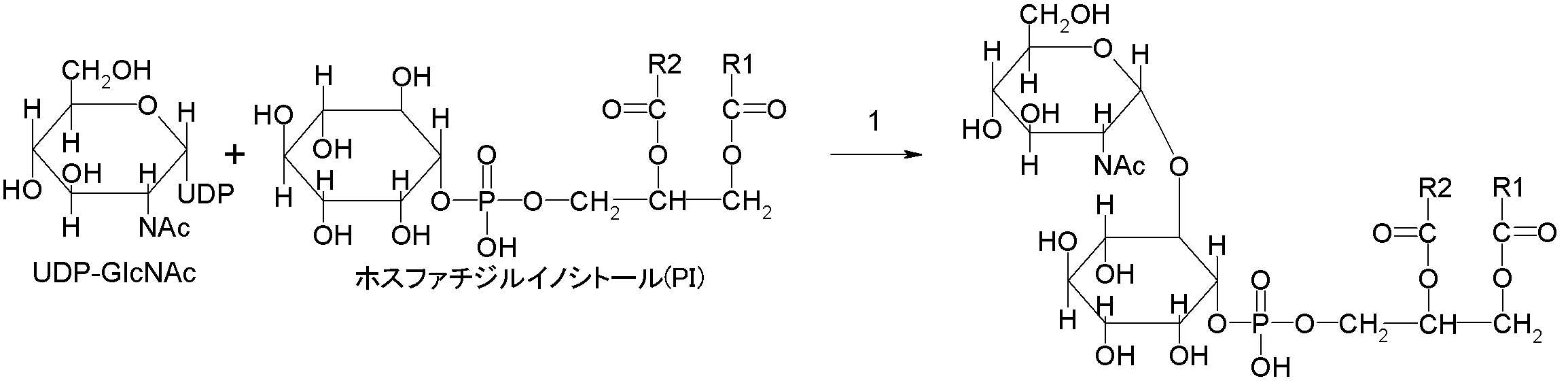
1: N-acetylglucosaminyltransferase complex (GPI GnT, EC 2.4.1.198)

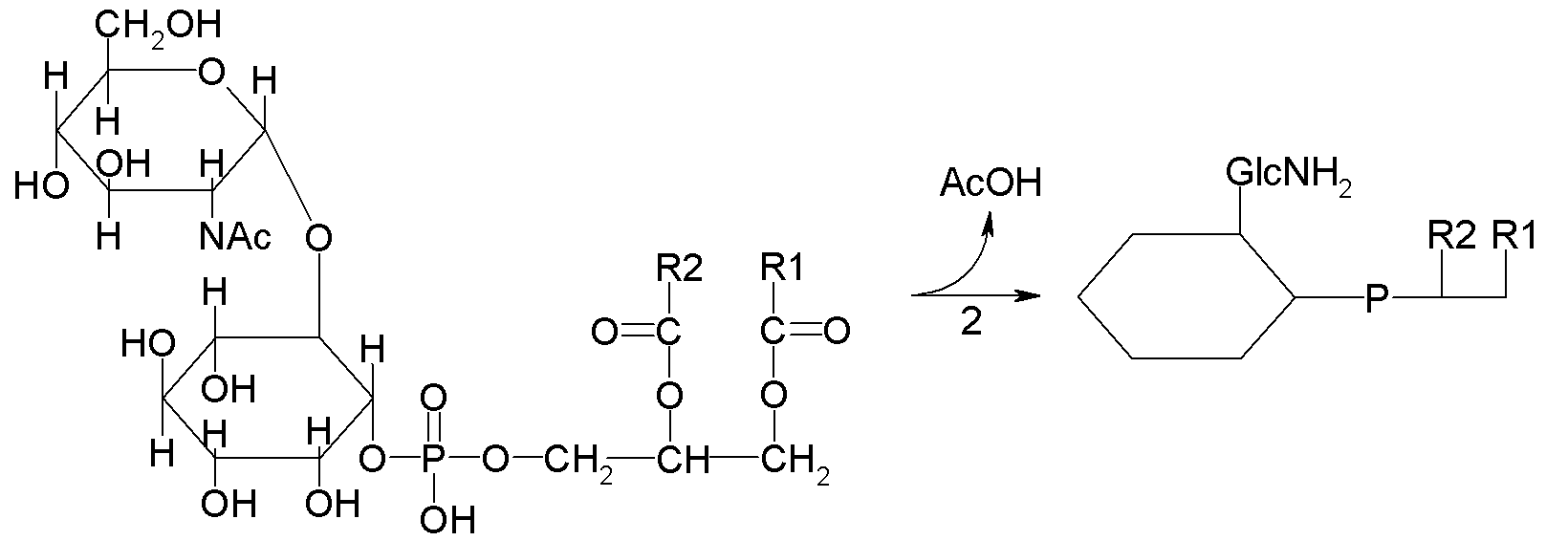
2: N-deacetylase (EC 3.5.1.89)

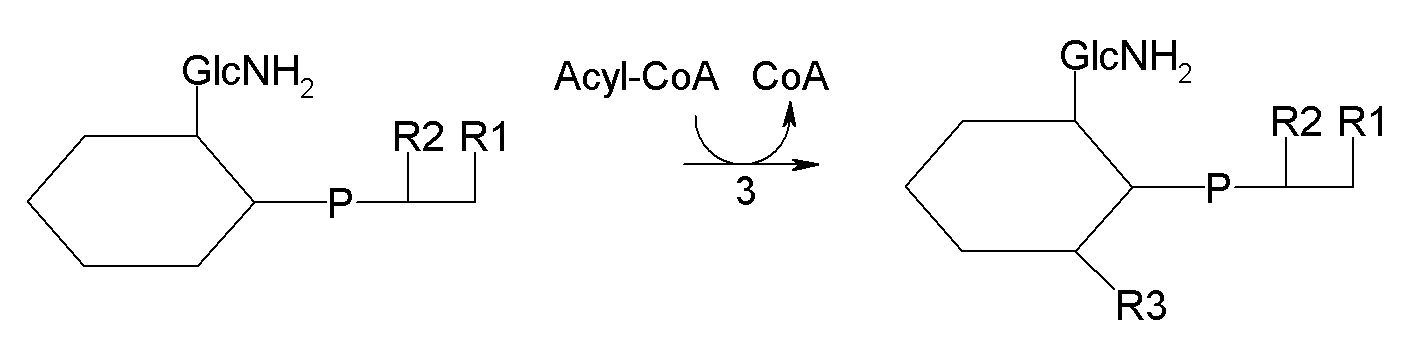
3: Inositol acyltransferase (PIGW, EC:2.3.-.-)

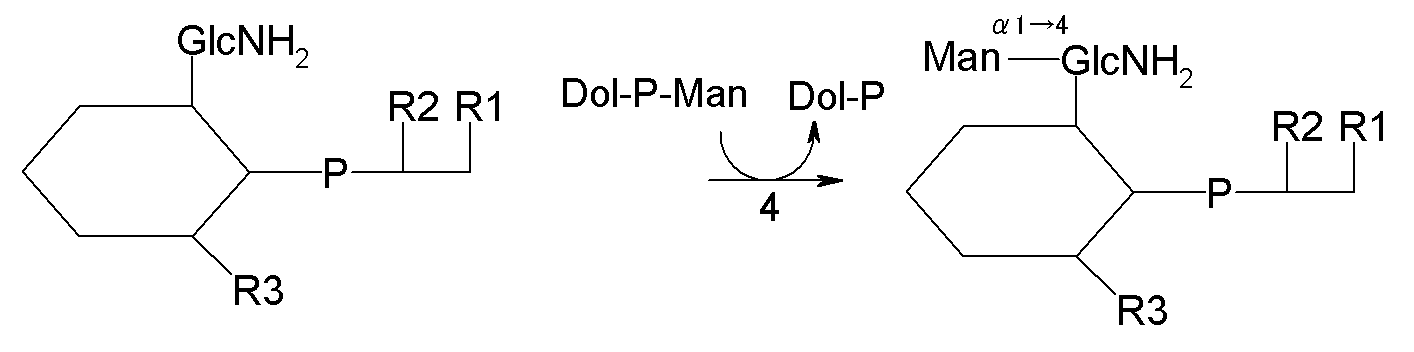
4: 4-Mannosyltransferase (MT-I; PIGV + PIGM + PIGX, EC 2.4.1.-)

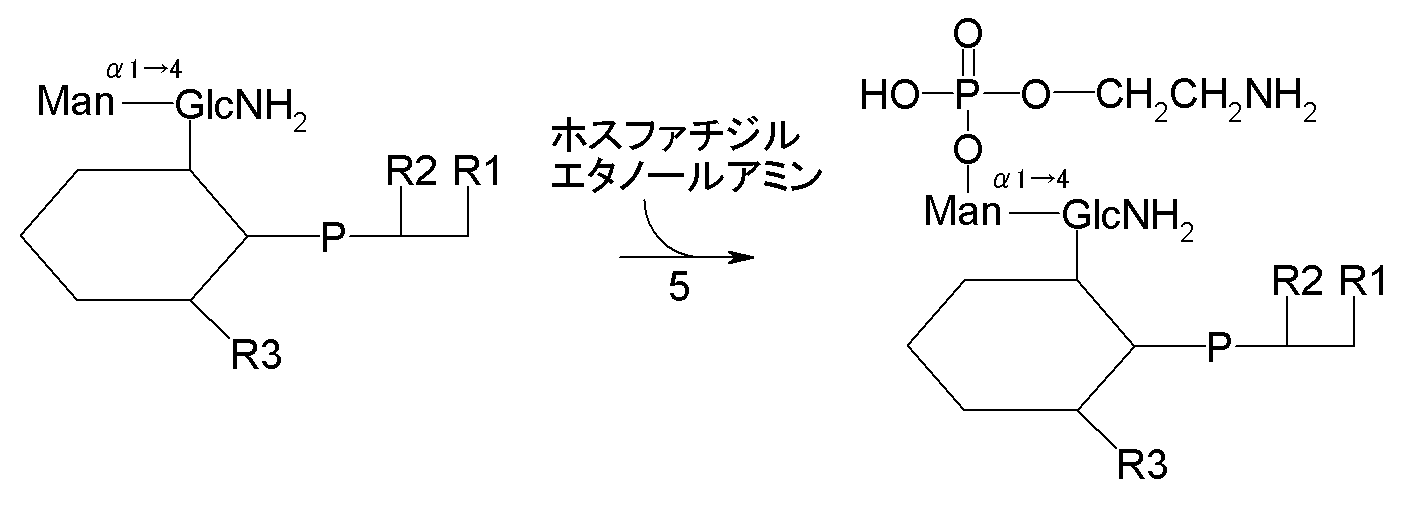
5: Ethanolamine phosphotransferase (with phosphatidylethanolamine; PIGN, EC EC:2.7.-.-)

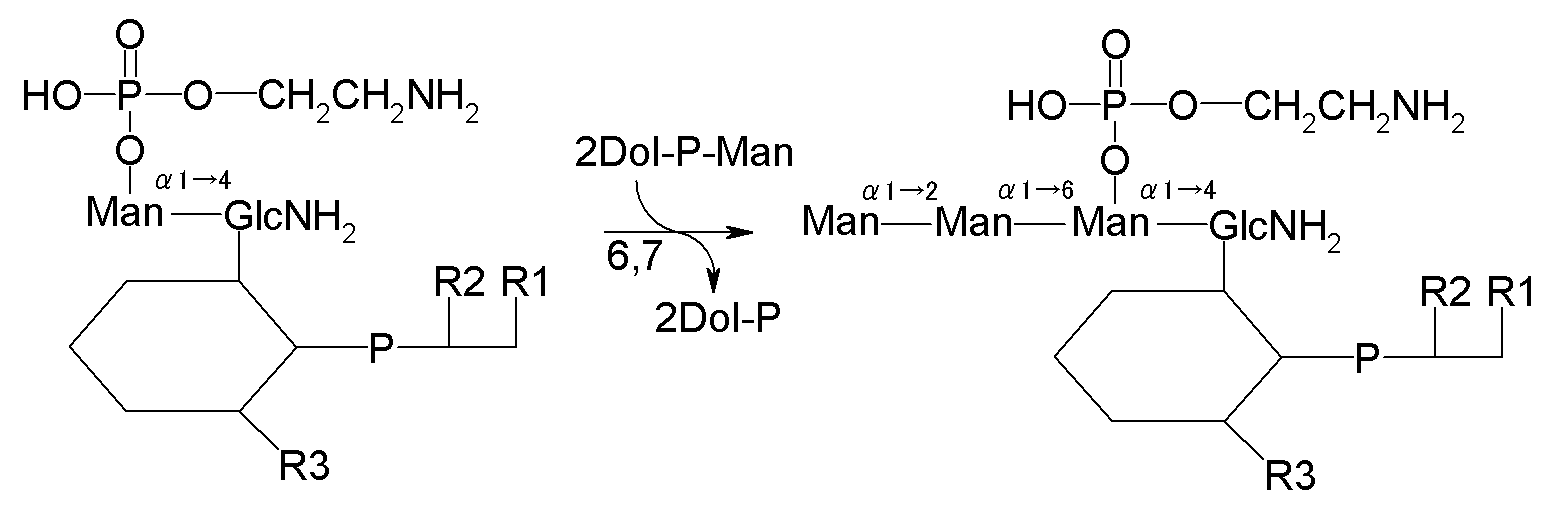
6, 7: 4-Mannosyltransferase (MT-II, MT-III; PIGB, PIGZ)

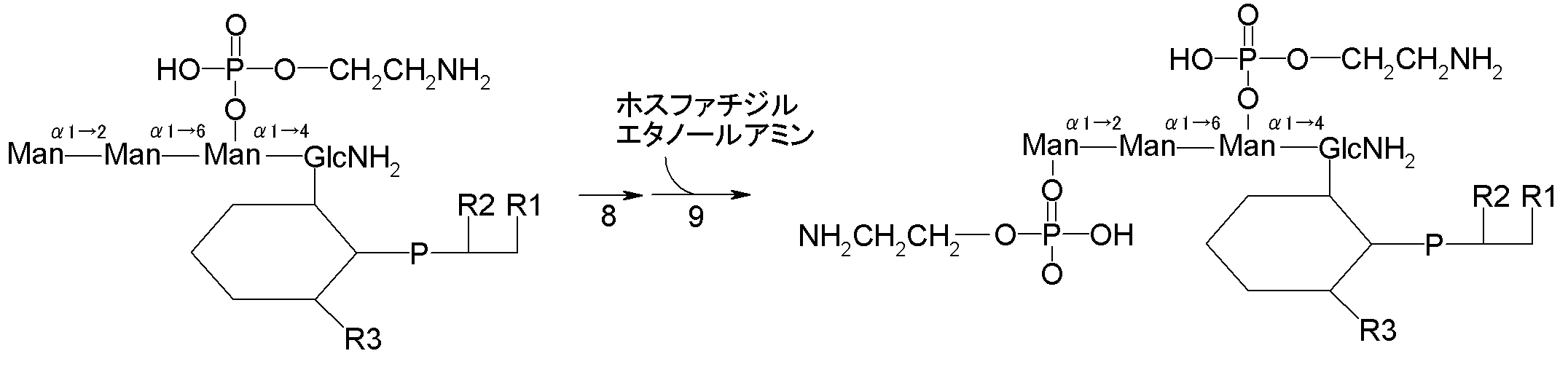
8: Substitution of fatty acids on PI, 9: Ethanolamine phosphotransferase (with phosphatidylethanolamine; PIGG, PIGO, PIGF)

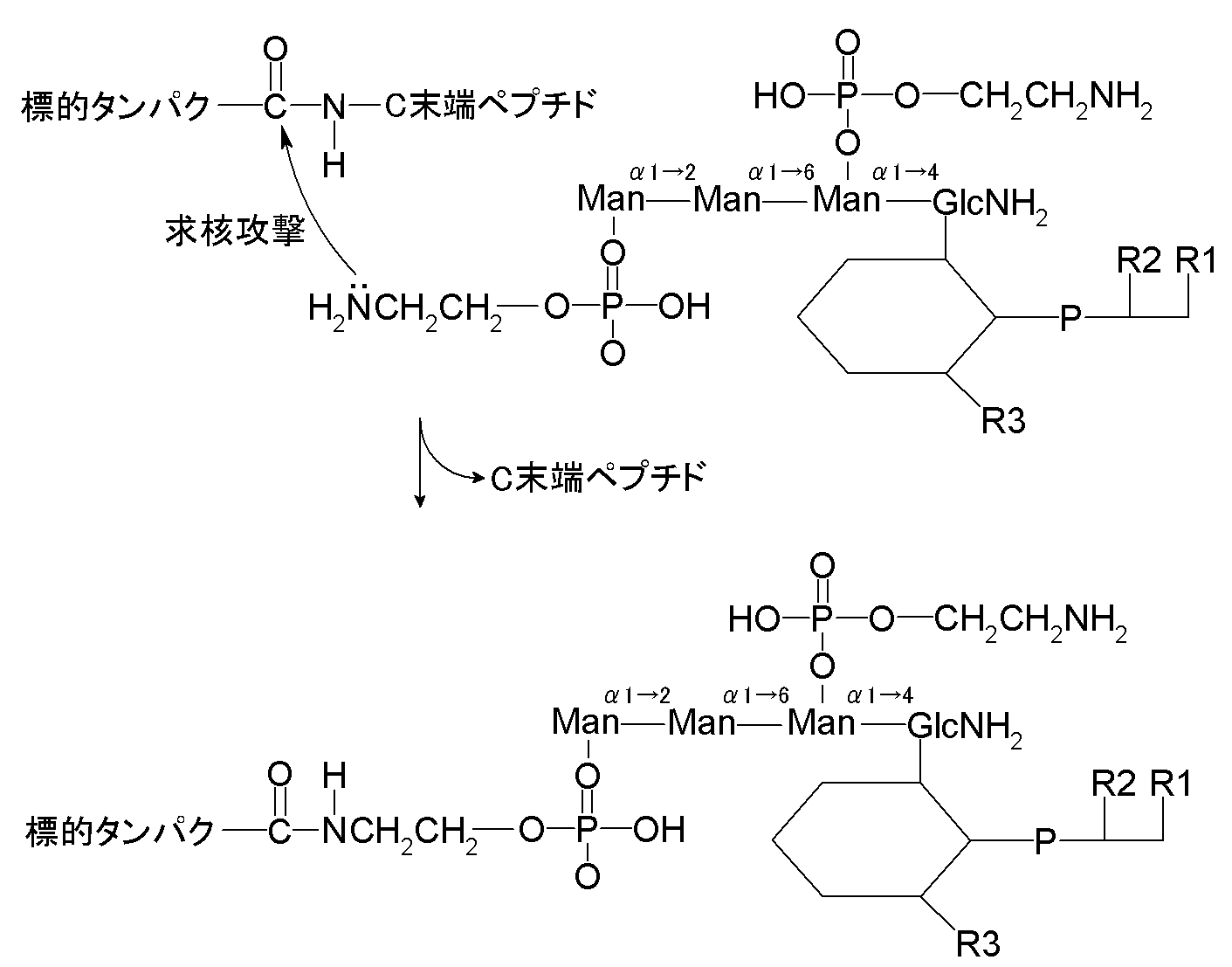
ethanolamine-GPI is attached to the protein via a nucleophilic attack against the carboxy part of the last peptide linkage, allowing it to replace the C-terminal residue (GPI-anchor transamidase)

A more up-to-date as well as more complete view is KEGG hsa00563. See also Reactome R-HSA-162710.

== Cleavage ==
Phospholipase C (PLC) is an enzyme known to cleave the phospho-glycerol bond found in GPI-anchored proteins. Treatment with PLC will cause release of GPI-linked proteins from the outer cell membrane, but acylation of the inositol residue can interfere with PLC cleavage. The T-cell marker Thy-1 and acetylcholinesterase, as well as both intestinal and placental alkaline phosphatases, are known to be GPI-linked and are released by treatment with PLC. GPI-linked proteins are thought to be preferentially located in lipid rafts, suggesting a high level of organization within plasma membrane microdomains.

== GPI-anchor synthesis deficiencies ==
=== In humans ===
Defects in the GPI-anchor synthesis occur in rare acquired diseases such as paroxysmal nocturnal hemoglobinuria (PNH) and congenital diseases such as hyperphosphatasia with mental retardation syndrome (HPMRS). In PNH a somatic defect in blood stem cells, which is required for GPI synthesis, results in faulty GPI linkage of decay-accelerating factor (DAF) and CD59 in red blood cells. The most common cause of PNH are somatic mutations in the X-chromosomal gene PIGA. However, a PNH case with a germline mutation in the autosomal gene PIGT and a second acquired somatic hit has also been reported. Without these proteins linked to the cell surface, the complement system can lyse the cell, and high numbers of RBCs are destroyed, leading to hemoglobinuria. For patients with HPMRS, disease-causing mutations have been reported in the genes PIGV, PIGO, PGAP2 and PGAP3.

=== In other species ===
The variable surface glycoproteins from the sleeping sickness protozoan Trypanosoma brucei are attached to the plasma membrane via a GPI anchor.
