= PHF3 =

Protein-coding gene in the species Homo sapiens

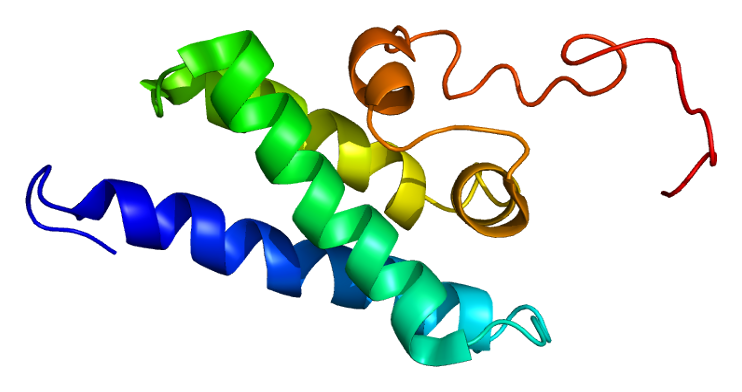

Identifiers
- Aliases: PHF3, PHD finger protein 3
- External IDs: OMIM: 607789; MGI: 2446126; GeneCards: PHF3
Available structures
PDB	Human UniProt search: PDBe RCSB
PDB	List of PDB id codes 2DME

Gene location (Human)
Chr.	Chromosome 6 (human)
Band	6q12	Start	63,635,802 bp
Band	6q12	End	63,779,336 bp

Gene location (Mouse)
Chr.	Chromosome 1 (mouse)
Band	1|1 A5- B	Start	30,841,420 bp
Band	1|1 A5- B	End	30,913,002 bp
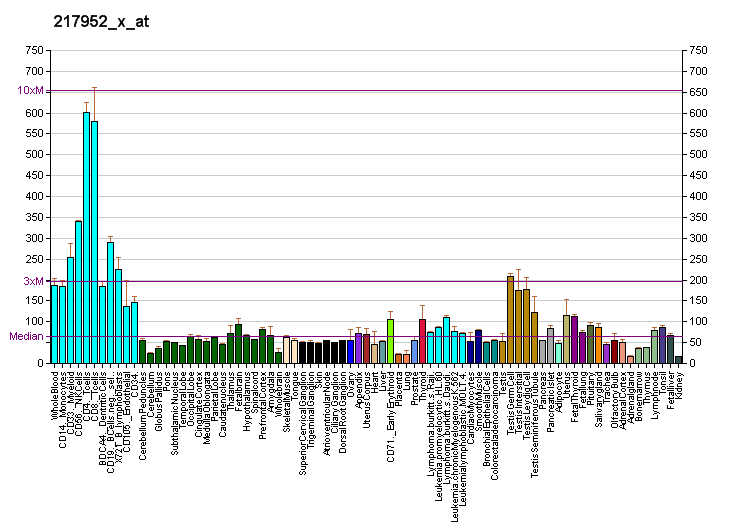

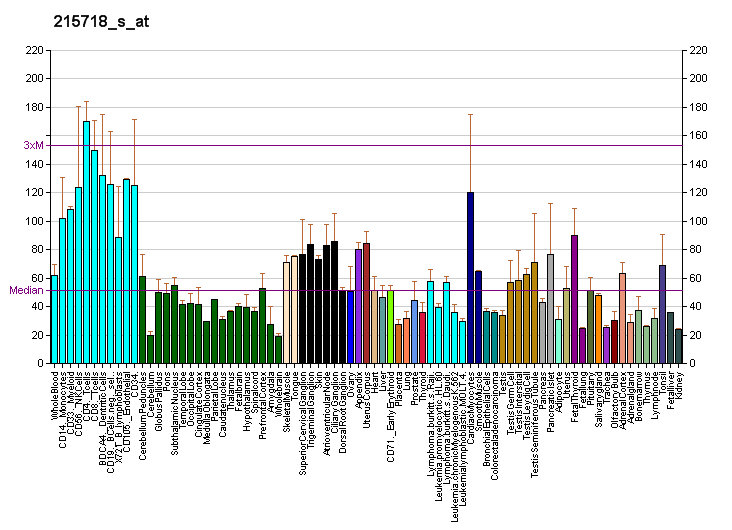

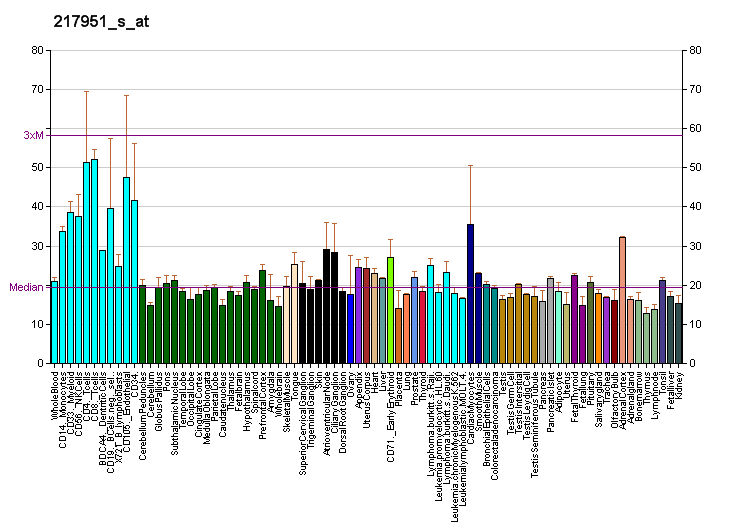
RNA expression pattern
Bgee	Human / Mouse (ortholog); Top expressed in: tendon of biceps brachii; Achilles tendon; germinal epithelium; tibia; endothelial cell; parietal pleura; internal globus pallidus; visceral pleura; corpus callosum; palpebral conjunctiva / Top expressed in: secondary oocyte; zygote; tail of embryo; primary oocyte; genital tubercle; neural layer of retina; renal corpuscle; left lung lobe; cumulus cell; mesenteric lymph nodes; More reference expression data
BioGPS	More reference expression data
Gene ontology
Molecular function	metal ion binding; molecular function
Cellular component	cellular component
Biological process	multicellular organism development; transcription, DNA-templated
Sources:Amigo / QuickGO
Orthologs
Databases	NCBI: entry; OMA: entry
Species	Human	Mouse
Entrez	23469	213109
Ensembl	ENSG00000118482	ENSMUSG00000048874
UniProt	Q92576	n/a
RefSeq (mRNA)	NM_001290259; NM_001290260; NM_015153; NM_001370348; NM_001370349 NM_001370350	NM_001081080; NM_025871
RefSeq (protein)	NP_001277188; NP_001277189; NP_055968; NP_001357277; NP_001357278 NP_001357279	n/a
Location (UCSC)	Chr 6: 63.64 – 63.78 Mb	Chr 1: 30.84 – 30.91 Mb
PubMed search
- Wikidata
View/Edit Human	View/Edit Mouse

PHD finger protein 3 is a protein that in humans is encoded by the PHF3 gene.
