= OR51I2 =

Protein-coding gene in the species Homo sapiens

Identifiers
- Aliases: OR51I2, OR11-38, olfactory receptor family 51 subfamily I member 2
- External IDs: MGI: 3030475; GeneCards: OR51I2

Gene location (Human)
Chr.	Chromosome 11 (human)
Band	11p15.4	Start	5,449,323 bp
Band	11p15.4	End	5,456,518 bp

Gene location (Mouse)
Chr.	Chromosome 7 (mouse)
Band	7|7 E3	Start	103,684,652 bp
Band	7|7 E3	End	103,691,279 bp
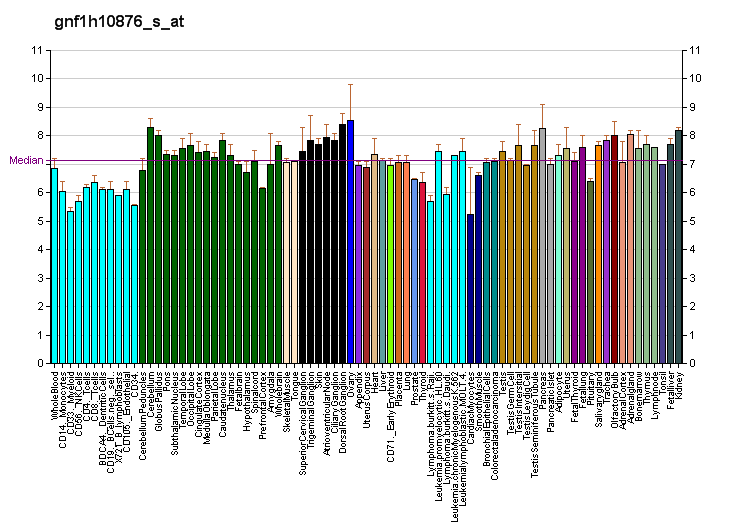

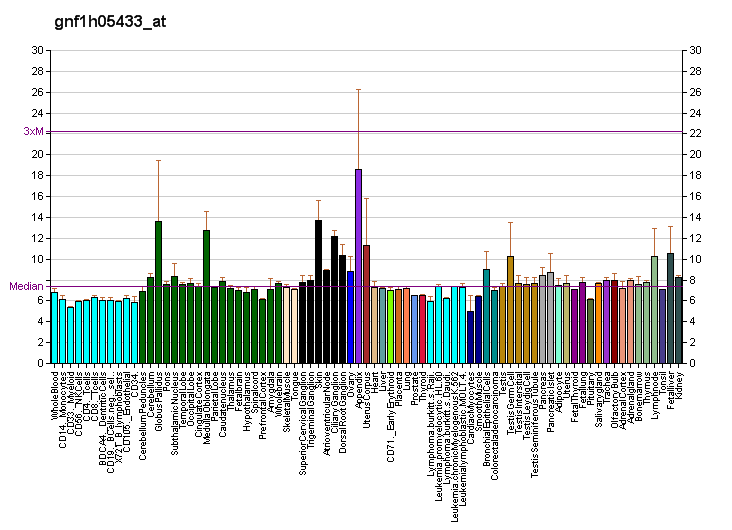

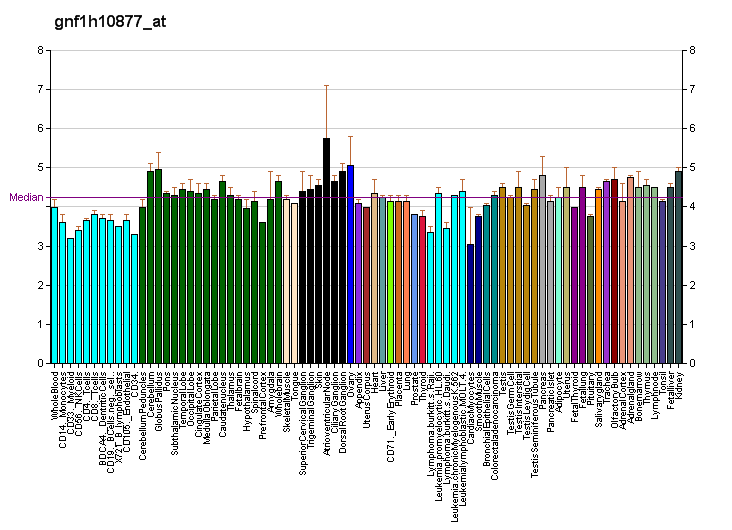
RNA expression pattern
Bgee	Human / Mouse (ortholog); Top expressed in: tibialis anterior muscle; pancreatic ductal cell; deltoid muscle; lower lobe of lung / Top expressed in: respiratory epithelium; nasal epithelium; olfactory epithelium; More reference expression data
BioGPS	More reference expression data
Gene ontology
Molecular function	G protein-coupled receptor activity; olfactory receptor activity; signal transducer activity
Cellular component	integral component of membrane; plasma membrane; membrane
Biological process	sensory perception of smell; signal transduction; response to stimulus; detection of chemical stimulus involved in sensory perception of smell; G protein-coupled receptor signaling pathway
Sources:Amigo / QuickGO
Orthologs
Databases	NCBI: entry; OMA: entry
Species	Human	Mouse
Entrez	390064	259075
Ensembl	ENSG00000187918	ENSMUSG00000073932
UniProt	Q9H344	Q8VGX6
RefSeq (mRNA)	NM_001004754	NM_147072
RefSeq (protein)	NP_001004754	NP_667283
Location (UCSC)	Chr 11: 5.45 – 5.46 Mb	Chr 7: 103.68 – 103.69 Mb
PubMed search
- Wikidata
View/Edit Human	View/Edit Mouse

Olfactory receptor 51I2 is a protein that in humans is encoded by the OR51I2 gene.

Olfactory receptors interact with odorant molecules in the nose, to initiate a neuronal response that triggers the perception of a smell. The olfactory receptor proteins are members of a large family of G-protein-coupled receptors (GPCR) arising from single coding-exon genes. Olfactory receptors share a 7-transmembrane domain structure with many neurotransmitter and hormone receptors and are responsible for the recognition and G protein-mediated transduction of odorant signals. The olfactory receptor gene family is the largest in the genome. The nomenclature assigned to the olfactory receptor genes and proteins for this organism is independent of other organisms.

== See also ==
- Olfactory receptor
