= OR52B2 =

Protein-coding gene in the species Homo sapiens

Identifiers
- Aliases: OR52B2, OR11-70, olfactory receptor family 52 subfamily B member 2
- External IDs: MGI: 3030525; GeneCards: OR52B2

Gene location (Human)
Chr.	Chromosome 11 (human)
Band	11p15.4	Start	6,169,355 bp
Band	11p15.4	End	6,170,326 bp

Gene location (Mouse)
Chr.	Chromosome 7 (mouse)
Band	7|7 E3	Start	104,984,716 bp
Band	7|7 E3	End	104,991,477 bp
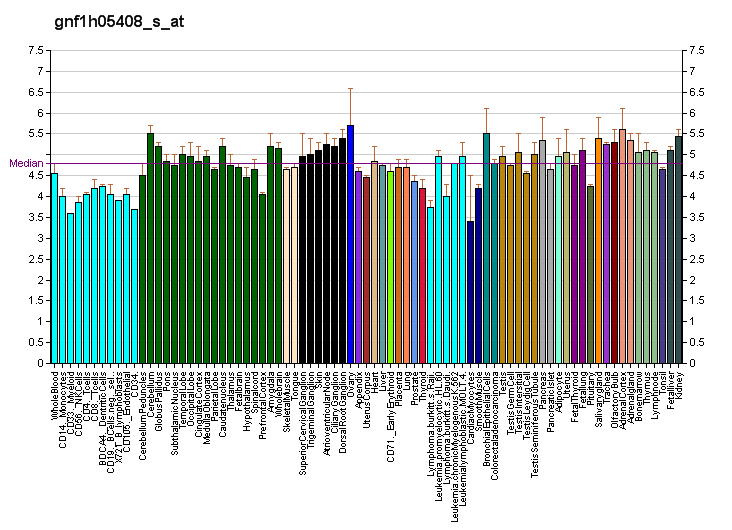

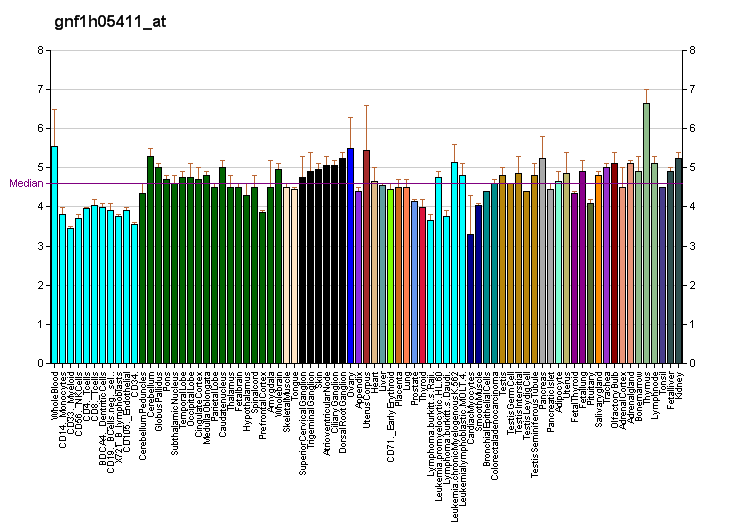
RNA expression pattern
Bgee	Human / Mouse (ortholog); Top expressed in: gonad; ganglionic eminence / Top expressed in: respiratory epithelium; nasal epithelium; olfactory epithelium; embryo; superior frontal gyrus; striatum of neuraxis; hypothalamus; More reference expression data
BioGPS	More reference expression data
Gene ontology
Molecular function	G protein-coupled receptor activity; olfactory receptor activity; signal transducer activity
Cellular component	integral component of membrane; plasma membrane; membrane
Biological process	sensory perception of smell; signal transduction; response to stimulus; detection of chemical stimulus involved in sensory perception of smell; G protein-coupled receptor signaling pathway
Sources:Amigo / QuickGO
Orthologs
Databases	NCBI: entry; OMA: entry
Species	Human	Mouse
Entrez	255725	259063
Ensembl	ENSG00000255307	ENSMUSG00000043948
UniProt	Q96RD2	Q8VGW5
RefSeq (mRNA)	NM_001004052	NM_147061
RefSeq (protein)	NP_001004052	NP_667272
Location (UCSC)	Chr 11: 6.17 – 6.17 Mb	Chr 7: 104.98 – 104.99 Mb
PubMed search
- Wikidata
View/Edit Human	View/Edit Mouse

Olfactory receptor 52B2 is a protein that in humans is encoded by the OR52B2 gene.

Olfactory receptors interact with odorant molecules in the nose, to initiate a neuronal response that triggers the perception of a smell. The olfactory receptor proteins are members of a large family of G-protein-coupled receptors (GPCR) arising from single coding-exon genes. Olfactory receptors share a 7-transmembrane domain structure with many neurotransmitter and hormone receptors and are responsible for the recognition and G protein-mediated transduction of odorant signals. The olfactory receptor gene family is the largest in the genome. The nomenclature assigned to the olfactory receptor genes and proteins for this organism is independent of other organisms.

== See also ==
- Olfactory receptor
