= OR8D4 =

Protein-coding gene in the species Homo sapiens

Identifiers
- Aliases: OR8D4, OR11-275, olfactory receptor family 8 subfamily D member 4
- External IDs: MGI: 3030819; GeneCards: OR8D4

Gene location (Human)
Chr.	Chromosome 11 (human)
Band	11q24.1	Start	123,902,167 bp
Band	11q24.1	End	123,909,229 bp

Gene location (Mouse)
Chr.	Chromosome 9 (mouse)
Band	9|9 A5.1	Start	40,037,604 bp
Band	9|9 A5.1	End	40,041,480 bp
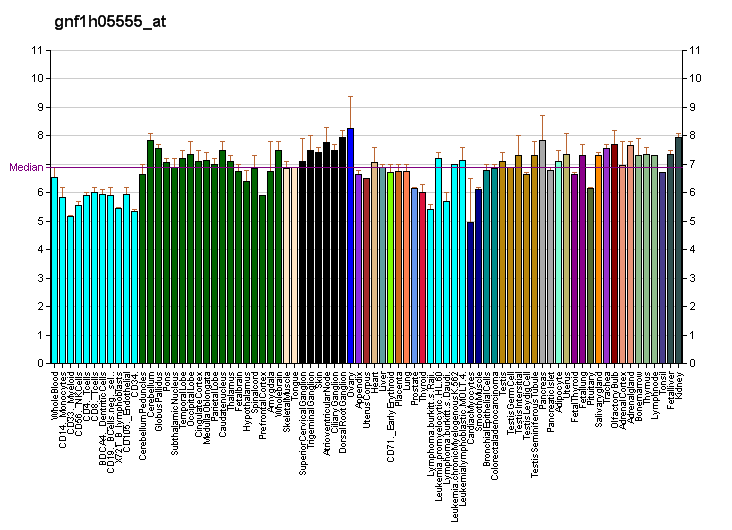

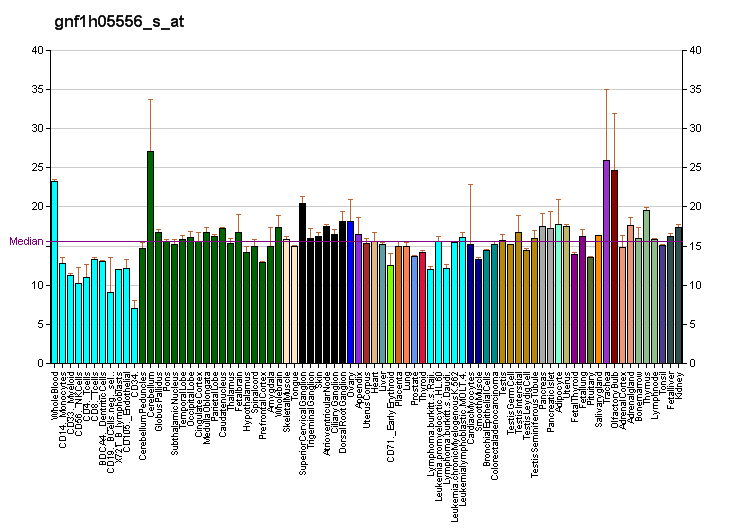
RNA expression pattern
Bgee	Human / Mouse (ortholog); Top expressed in: testicle; body of pancreas / Top expressed in: embryo; respiratory epithelium; nasal epithelium; olfactory epithelium; epiblast; yolk sac; More reference expression data
BioGPS	More reference expression data
Gene ontology
Molecular function	G protein-coupled receptor activity; signal transducer activity; olfactory receptor activity; odorant binding
Cellular component	integral component of membrane; plasma membrane; membrane
Biological process	response to stimulus; signal transduction; sensory perception of smell; detection of chemical stimulus involved in sensory perception of smell; G protein-coupled receptor signaling pathway
Sources:Amigo / QuickGO
Orthologs
Databases	NCBI: entry; OMA: entry
Species	Human	Mouse
Entrez	338662	258854
Ensembl	ENSG00000181518	ENSMUSG00000049073
UniProt	Q8NGM9	Q8VGB4
RefSeq (mRNA)	NM_001005197	NM_146855
RefSeq (protein)	NP_001005197	NP_667066
Location (UCSC)	Chr 11: 123.9 – 123.91 Mb	Chr 9: 40.04 – 40.04 Mb
PubMed search
- Wikidata
View/Edit Human	View/Edit Mouse

Olfactory receptor 8D4 is a protein that in humans is encoded by the OR8D4 gene.

Olfactory receptors interact with odorant molecules in the nose, to initiate a neuronal response that triggers the perception of a smell. The olfactory receptor proteins are members of a large family of G-protein-coupled receptors (GPCR) arising from single coding-exon genes. Olfactory receptors share a 7-transmembrane domain structure with many neurotransmitter and hormone receptors and are responsible for the recognition and G protein-mediated transduction of odorant signals. The olfactory receptor gene family is the largest in the genome. The nomenclature assigned to the olfactory receptor genes and proteins for this organism is independent of other organisms.

== See also ==
- Olfactory receptor
