= OR52H1 =

Protein-coding gene in the species Homo sapiens

Identifiers
- Aliases: OR52H1, OR11-41, OR11-45, olfactory receptor family 52 subfamily H member 1, olfactory receptor family 52 subfamily H member 1 (gene/pseudogene)
- External IDs: MGI: 3030482; GeneCards: OR52H1

Gene location (Human)
Chr.	Chromosome 11 (human)
Band	11p15.4	Start	5,544,489 bp
Band	11p15.4	End	5,548,540 bp

Gene location (Mouse)
Chr.	Chromosome 7 (mouse)
Band	7|7 E3	Start	103,826,805 bp
Band	7|7 E3	End	103,832,599 bp
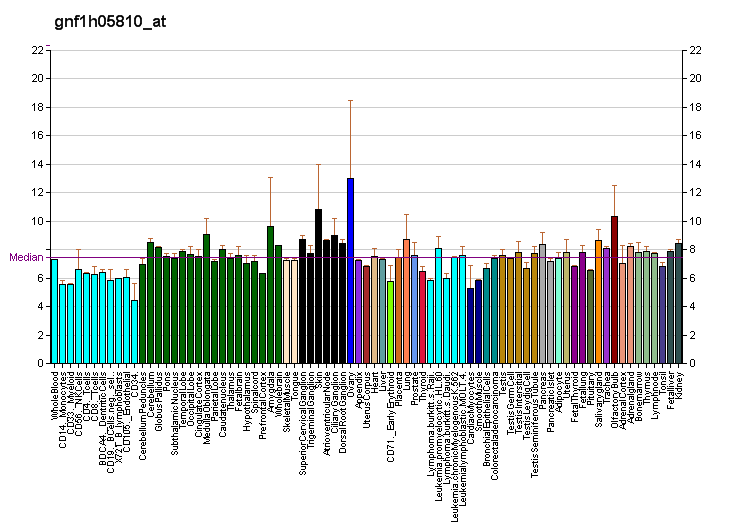
RNA expression pattern
Bgee	Human / Mouse (ortholog); Top expressed in: sural nerve; apex of heart; muscle of thigh; gallbladder; fallopian tube / Top expressed in: primary visual cortex; superior frontal gyrus; cerebellar cortex; neural tube; tail of embryo; mesencephalon; dentate gyrus of hippocampal formation granule cell; genital tubercle; limb; blastocyst; More reference expression data
BioGPS	More reference expression data
Gene ontology
Molecular function	G protein-coupled receptor activity; signal transducer activity; olfactory receptor activity
Cellular component	integral component of membrane; membrane; plasma membrane
Biological process	sensory perception of smell; signal transduction; response to stimulus; detection of chemical stimulus involved in sensory perception of smell; G protein-coupled receptor signaling pathway
Sources:Amigo / QuickGO
Orthologs
Databases	NCBI: entry; OMA: entry
Species	Human	Mouse
Entrez	390067	258746
Ensembl	ENSG00000181616	ENSMUSG00000042909
UniProt	Q8NGJ2	Q8VG19
RefSeq (mRNA)	NM_001005289	NM_146751
RefSeq (protein)	NP_001005289	NP_666962
Location (UCSC)	Chr 11: 5.54 – 5.55 Mb	Chr 7: 103.83 – 103.83 Mb
PubMed search
- Wikidata
View/Edit Human	View/Edit Mouse

Olfactory receptor 52H1 is a protein that in humans is encoded by the OR52H1 gene.

Olfactory receptors interact with odorant molecules in the nose, to initiate a neuronal response that triggers the perception of a smell. The olfactory receptor proteins are members of a large family of G-protein-coupled receptors (GPCR) arising from single coding-exon genes. Olfactory receptors share a 7-transmembrane domain structure with many neurotransmitter and hormone receptors and are responsible for the recognition and G protein-mediated transduction of odorant signals. The olfactory receptor gene family is the largest in the genome. The nomenclature assigned to the olfactory receptor genes and proteins for this organism is independent of other organisms.

== See also ==
- Olfactory receptor
