= OR7A17 =

Protein-coding gene in the species Homo sapiens

Identifiers
- Aliases: OR7A17, BC85395_4, HTPCRX19, olfactory receptor family 7 subfamily A member 17
- External IDs: MGI: 109316; GeneCards: OR7A17

Gene location (Human)
| Chr. | Chromosome 19 (human) |
| Band | 19p13.12 | Start | 14,878,203 bp |
| Band | 19p13.12 | End | 14,886,132 bp |

Gene location (Mouse)
| Chr. | Chromosome 16 (mouse) |
| Band | 16|16 A3 | Start | 16,490,092 bp |
| Band | 16|16 A3 | End | 16,494,269 bp |
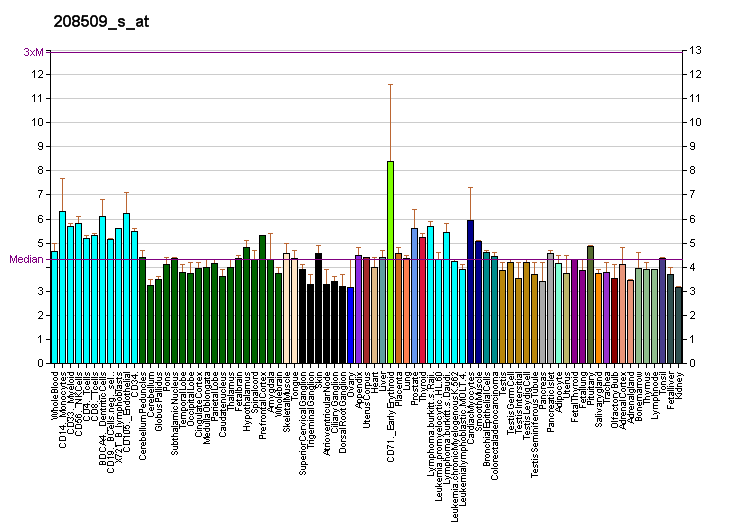
RNA expression pattern
| Bgee | Human / Mouse (ortholog); Top expressed in: sural nerve / Top expressed in: respiratory epithelium; nasal epithelium; olfactory epithelium; embryo; testicle; spermatid; More reference expression data |
| BioGPS | More reference expression data |
Gene ontology
| Molecular function | G protein-coupled receptor activity; olfactory receptor activity; signal transducer activity |
| Cellular component | integral component of membrane; plasma membrane; membrane |
| Biological process | sensory perception of smell; detection of chemical stimulus involved in sensory perception of smell; signal transduction; response to stimulus; G protein-coupled receptor signaling pathway |
Sources:Amigo / QuickGO
Orthologs
| Databases | NCBI: entry; OMA: entry |
| Species | Human | Mouse |
| Entrez | 26333 | 18316 |
| Ensembl | ENSG00000185385 | ENSMUSG00000048101 |
| UniProt | O14581 | Q9JHB2 |
| RefSeq (mRNA) | NM_030901 | NM_146335 |
| RefSeq (protein) | NP_112163 | NP_666447 |
| Location (UCSC) | Chr 19: 14.88 – 14.89 Mb | Chr 16: 16.49 – 16.49 Mb |
| PubMed search |
- Wikidata
| View/Edit Human | View/Edit Mouse |

Olfactory receptor 7A17 is a protein that in humans is encoded by the OR7A17 gene.

Olfactory receptors interact with odorant molecules in the nose, to initiate a neuronal response that triggers the perception of a smell. The olfactory receptor proteins are members of a large family of G-protein-coupled receptors (GPCR) arising from single coding-exon genes. Olfactory receptors share a 7-transmembrane domain structure with many neurotransmitter and hormone receptors and are responsible for the recognition and G protein-mediated transduction of odorant signals. The olfactory receptor gene family is the largest in the genome. The nomenclature assigned to the olfactory receptor genes and proteins for this organism is independent of other organisms.

== See also ==
- Olfactory receptor
