= OR10G3 =

Protein-coding gene in the species Homo sapiens

Identifiers
- Aliases: OR10G3, olfactory receptor, family 10, subfamily G, member 3, OR14-40, olfactory receptor family 10 subfamily G member 3
- External IDs: MGI: 3031346; GeneCards: OR10G3

Gene location (Human)
Chr.	Chromosome 14 (human)
Band	14q11.2	Start	21,568,520 bp
Band	14q11.2	End	21,580,076 bp

Gene location (Mouse)
Chr.	Chromosome 14 (mouse)
Band	14|14 C2	Start	52,608,789 bp
Band	14|14 C2	End	52,616,625 bp
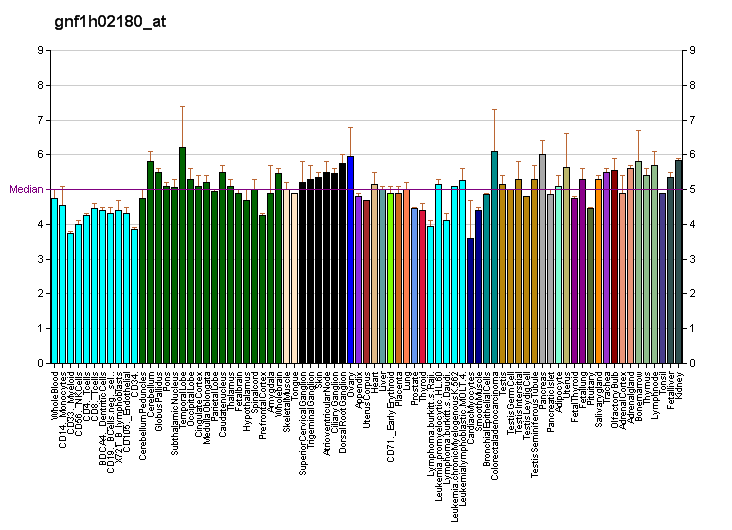
RNA expression pattern
Bgee	Human / Mouse (ortholog); Top expressed in: testicle; right lung; pituitary gland; anterior pituitary; blood; right lobe of liver; granulocyte; stromal cell of endometrium; subcutaneous adipose tissue; Achilles tendon / Top expressed in: blastocyst; embryo; hypothalamus; More reference expression data
BioGPS	More reference expression data
Gene ontology
Molecular function	G protein-coupled receptor activity; olfactory receptor activity; signal transducer activity
Cellular component	integral component of membrane; plasma membrane; membrane
Biological process	sensory perception of smell; signal transduction; response to stimulus; detection of chemical stimulus involved in sensory perception of smell; G protein-coupled receptor signaling pathway
Sources:Amigo / QuickGO
Orthologs
Databases	NCBI: entry; OMA: entry
Species	Human	Mouse
Entrez	26533	258424
Ensembl	ENSG00000169208	ENSMUSG00000094140
UniProt	Q8NGC4	Q8VF72
RefSeq (mRNA)	NM_001005465	NM_146432
RefSeq (protein)	NP_001005465	NP_666643
Location (UCSC)	Chr 14: 21.57 – 21.58 Mb	Chr 14: 52.61 – 52.62 Mb
PubMed search
- Wikidata
View/Edit Human	View/Edit Mouse

Olfactory receptor 10G3 is a protein that in humans is encoded by the OR10G3 gene.

Olfactory receptors interact with odorant molecules in the nose, to initiate a neuronal response that triggers the perception of a smell. The olfactory receptor proteins are members of a large family of G-protein-coupled receptors (GPCR) arising from single coding-exon genes. Olfactory receptors share a 7-transmembrane domain structure with many neurotransmitter and hormone receptors and are responsible for the recognition and G protein-mediated transduction of odorant signals. The olfactory receptor gene family is the largest in the genome. The nomenclature assigned to the olfactory receptor genes and proteins for this organism is independent of other organisms.

== See also ==
- Olfactory receptor
