= OR5J2 =

Protein-coding gene in the species Homo sapiens

Identifiers
- Aliases: OR5J2, OR11-266, olfactory receptor family 5 subfamily J member 2
- External IDs: MGI: 3030886; GeneCards: OR5J2

Gene location (Human)
Chr.	Chromosome 11 (human)
Band	11q12.1	Start	56,176,618 bp
Band	11q12.1	End	56,177,556 bp

Gene location (Mouse)
Chr.	Chromosome 2 (mouse)
Band	2|2 D	Start	86,122,799 bp
Band	2|2 D	End	86,129,577 bp
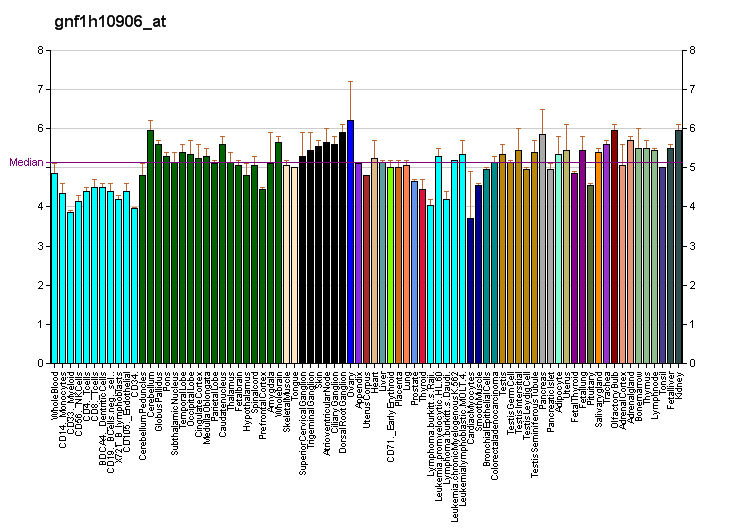
RNA expression pattern
Bgee	Human / Mouse (ortholog); Top expressed in: C1 segment / Top expressed in: embryo; respiratory epithelium; nasal epithelium; peripheral nervous system; olfactory epithelium; secondary oocyte; primary oocyte; More reference expression data
BioGPS	More reference expression data
Gene ontology
Molecular function	G protein-coupled receptor activity; odorant binding; olfactory receptor activity; signal transducer activity
Cellular component	integral component of membrane; plasma membrane; membrane
Biological process	sensory perception of smell; signal transduction; response to stimulus; detection of chemical stimulus involved in sensory perception of smell; G protein-coupled receptor signaling pathway
Sources:Amigo / QuickGO
Orthologs
Databases	NCBI: entry; OMA: entry
Species	Human	Mouse
Entrez	282775	259012
Ensembl	ENSG00000174957	ENSMUSG00000047149
UniProt	Q8NH18	Q8VGR8
RefSeq (mRNA)	NM_001005492	NM_147010
RefSeq (protein)	NP_001005492	NP_667221
Location (UCSC)	Chr 11: 56.18 – 56.18 Mb	Chr 2: 86.12 – 86.13 Mb
PubMed search
- Wikidata
View/Edit Human	View/Edit Mouse

Olfactory receptor 5J2 is a protein that in humans is encoded by the OR5J2 gene.

Olfactory receptors interact with odorant molecules in the nose, to initiate a neuronal response that triggers the perception of a smell. The olfactory receptor proteins are members of a large family of G-protein-coupled receptors (GPCR) arising from single coding-exon genes. Olfactory receptors share a 7-transmembrane domain structure with many neurotransmitter and hormone receptors and are responsible for the recognition and G protein-mediated transduction of odorant signals. The olfactory receptor gene family is the largest in the genome. The nomenclature assigned to the olfactory receptor genes and proteins for this organism is independent of other organisms.

== See also ==
- Olfactory receptor
