= OR5AS1 =

Protein-coding gene in the species Homo sapiens

Identifiers
- Aliases: OR5AS1, OR11-168, olfactory receptor family 5 subfamily AS member 1
- External IDs: MGI: 3030945; GeneCards: OR5AS1

Gene location (Human)
| Chr. | Chromosome 11 (human) |
| Band | 11q12.1 | Start | 56,027,654 bp |
| Band | 11q12.1 | End | 56,038,191 bp |

Gene location (Mouse)
| Chr. | Chromosome 2 (mouse) |
| Band | 2|2 D | Start | 86,979,525 bp |
| Band | 2|2 D | End | 86,982,968 bp |
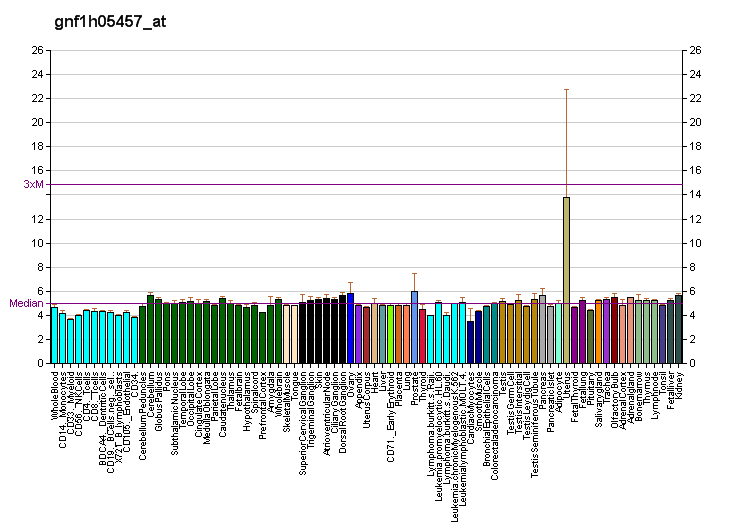
RNA expression pattern
| Bgee | Human / Mouse (ortholog); Top expressed in: testicle / n/a; More reference expression data |
| BioGPS | More reference expression data |
Gene ontology
| Molecular function | G protein-coupled receptor activity; odorant binding; olfactory receptor activity; signal transducer activity |
| Cellular component | integral component of membrane; plasma membrane; membrane |
| Biological process | sensory perception of smell; signal transduction; response to stimulus; detection of chemical stimulus involved in sensory perception of smell; G protein-coupled receptor signaling pathway |
Sources:Amigo / QuickGO
Orthologs
| Databases | NCBI: entry; OMA: entry |
| Species | Human | Mouse |
| Entrez | 219447 | 258586 |
| Ensembl | ENSG00000181785 | ENSMUSG00000075158 |
| UniProt | Q8N127 | Q7TR55 |
| RefSeq (mRNA) | NM_001001921 | NM_146593 |
| RefSeq (protein) | NP_001001921 | NP_666804 |
| Location (UCSC) | Chr 11: 56.03 – 56.04 Mb | Chr 2: 86.98 – 86.98 Mb |
| PubMed search |
- Wikidata
| View/Edit Human | View/Edit Mouse |

Olfactory receptor 5AS1 is a protein that in humans is encoded by the OR5AS1 gene.

Olfactory receptors interact with odorant molecules in the nose, to initiate a neuronal response that triggers the perception of a smell. The olfactory receptor proteins are members of a large family of G protein–coupled receptors (GPCR) arising from single coding-exon genes.

Olfactory receptors share a 7-transmembrane domain structure with many neurotransmitter and hormone receptors and are responsible for the recognition and G protein-mediated transduction of odorant signals. The olfactory receptor gene family is the largest in the genome. The nomenclature assigned to the olfactory receptor genes and proteins for this organism is independent of other organisms.
