= OR6F1 =

Protein-coding gene in humans

Identifiers
- Aliases: OR6F1, OR1-34, OR1-38, OST731, olfactory receptor family 6 subfamily F member 1
- External IDs: MGI: 3030142; GeneCards: OR6F1

Gene location (Human)
Chr.	Chromosome 1 (human)
Band	1q44	Start	247,711,436 bp
Band	1q44	End	247,716,646 bp

Gene location (Mouse)
Chr.	Chromosome 7 (mouse)
Band	7|7 D3	Start	85,967,426 bp
Band	7|7 D3	End	85,974,838 bp
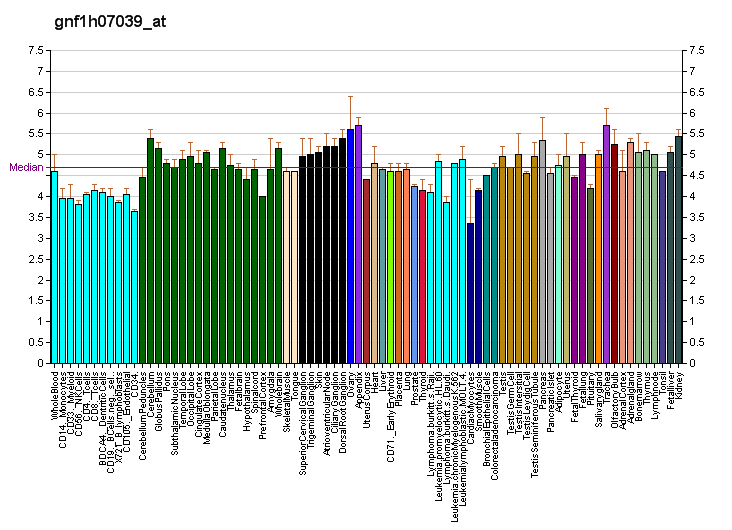
RNA expression pattern
Bgee	Human / Mouse (ortholog); Top expressed in: gonad; left testis; right testis / Top expressed in: respiratory epithelium; peripheral nervous system; nasal epithelium; olfactory epithelium; testicle; spermatid; More reference expression data
BioGPS	More reference expression data
Gene ontology
Molecular function	G protein-coupled receptor activity; olfactory receptor activity; signal transducer activity
Cellular component	integral component of membrane; plasma membrane; membrane
Biological process	sensory perception of smell; detection of chemical stimulus involved in sensory perception of smell; signal transduction; response to stimulus; G protein-coupled receptor signaling pathway
Sources:Amigo / QuickGO
Orthologs
Databases	NCBI: entry; OMA: entry
Species	Human	Mouse
Entrez	343169	258614
Ensembl	ENSG00000169214	ENSMUSG00000054498
UniProt	Q8NGZ6	Q8VFP2
RefSeq (mRNA)	NM_001005286	NM_146621
RefSeq (protein)	NP_001005286	NP_666832
Location (UCSC)	Chr 1: 247.71 – 247.72 Mb	Chr 7: 85.97 – 85.97 Mb
PubMed search
- Wikidata
View/Edit Human	View/Edit Mouse

Olfactory receptor 6F1 is a protein that in humans is encoded by the OR6F1 gene.

Olfactory receptors interact with odorant molecules in the nose, to initiate a neuronal response that triggers the perception of a smell. The olfactory receptor proteins are members of a large family of G-protein-coupled receptors (GPCR) arising from single coding-exon genes. Olfactory receptors share a 7-transmembrane domain structure with many neurotransmitter and hormone receptors and are responsible for the recognition and G protein-mediated transduction of odorant signals. The olfactory receptor gene family is the largest in the genome. The nomenclature assigned to the olfactory receptor genes and proteins for this organism is independent of other organisms.

== See also ==
- Olfactory receptor
