= OR10A3 =

Protein-coding gene in the species Homo sapiens

Identifiers
- Aliases: OR10A3, HSHTPCRX12, HTPCRX12, olfactory receptor family 10 subfamily A member 3
- External IDs: MGI: 3030352; GeneCards: OR10A3

Gene location (Human)
Chr.	Chromosome 11 (human)
Band	11p15.4	Start	7,937,171 bp
Band	11p15.4	End	7,941,708 bp

Gene location (Mouse)
Chr.	Chromosome 7 (mouse)
Band	7|7 E3	Start	108,479,395 bp
Band	7|7 E3	End	108,484,213 bp
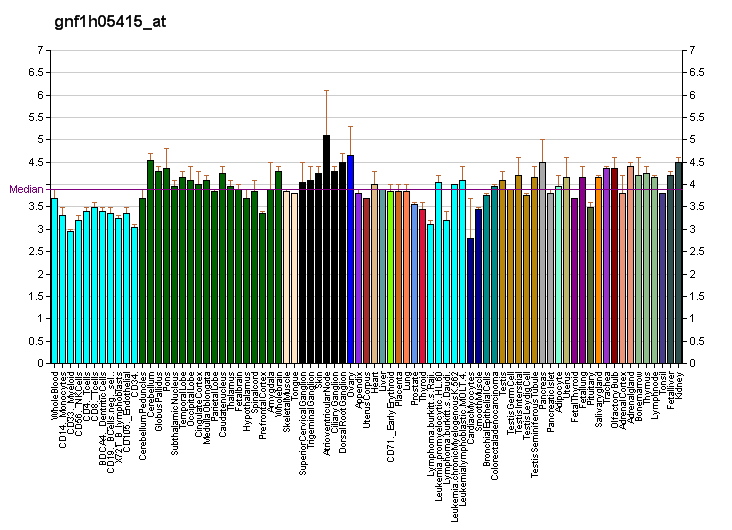
RNA expression pattern
Bgee	Human / Mouse (ortholog); Top expressed in: skin of leg; skin of abdomen; placenta / n/a; More reference expression data
BioGPS	More reference expression data
Gene ontology
Molecular function	G protein-coupled receptor activity; olfactory receptor activity; signal transducer activity
Cellular component	integral component of membrane; plasma membrane; membrane
Biological process	sensory perception of smell; signal transduction; response to stimulus; detection of chemical stimulus involved in sensory perception of smell; G protein-coupled receptor signaling pathway
Sources:Amigo / QuickGO
Orthologs
Databases	NCBI: entry; OMA: entry
Species	Human	Mouse
Entrez	26496	258303
Ensembl	ENSG00000273953; ENSG00000170683; ENSG00000281680	ENSMUSG00000046431
UniProt	P58181	Q8VEW1
RefSeq (mRNA)	NM_001003745	NM_146306
RefSeq (protein)	NP_001003745	NP_666418
Location (UCSC)	Chr 11: 7.94 – 7.94 Mb	Chr 7: 108.48 – 108.48 Mb
PubMed search
- Wikidata
View/Edit Human	View/Edit Mouse

Olfactory receptor 10A3 is a protein that in humans is encoded by the OR10A3 gene.

Olfactory receptors interact with odorant molecules in the nose, to initiate a neuronal response that triggers the perception of a smell. The olfactory receptor proteins are members of a large family of G-protein-coupled receptors (GPCR) arising from single coding-exon genes. Olfactory receptors share a 7-transmembrane domain structure with many neurotransmitter and hormone receptors and are responsible for the recognition and G protein-mediated transduction of odorant signals. The olfactory receptor gene family is the largest in the genome. The nomenclature assigned to the olfactory receptor genes and proteins for this organism is independent of other organisms.

== See also ==
- Olfactory receptor
