= OR52A1 =

Protein-coding gene in humans

Identifiers
- Aliases: OR52A1, HPFH1OR, olfactory receptor family 52 subfamily A member 1
- External IDs: MGI: 1341790; GeneCards: OR52A1

Gene location (Human)
Chr.	Chromosome 11 (human)
Band	11p15.4	Start	5,146,824 bp
Band	11p15.4	End	5,154,757 bp

Gene location (Mouse)
Chr.	Chromosome 7 (mouse)
Band	7|7 E3	Start	103,423,565 bp
Band	7|7 E3	End	103,428,905 bp
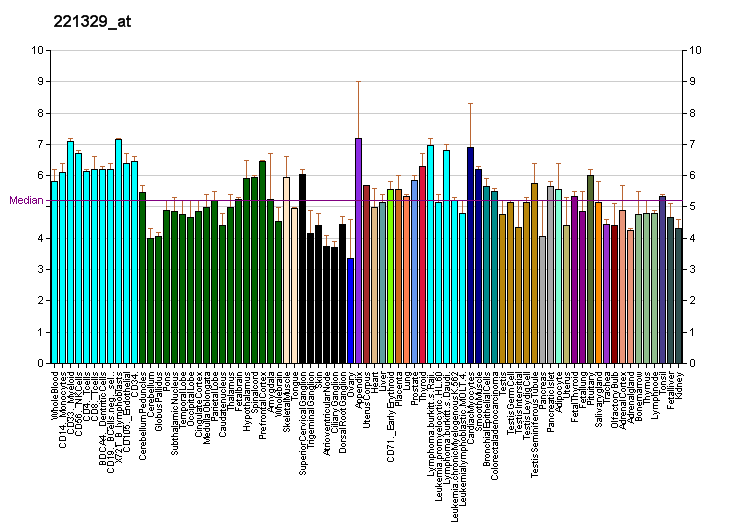
RNA expression pattern
Bgee	Human / Mouse (ortholog); Top expressed in: testicle; skin of thigh / Top expressed in: supraoptic nucleus; More reference expression data
BioGPS	More reference expression data
Gene ontology
Molecular function	G protein-coupled receptor activity; olfactory receptor activity; transmembrane signaling receptor activity; signal transducer activity
Cellular component	integral component of membrane; plasma membrane; integral component of plasma membrane; membrane
Biological process	sensory perception of smell; signal transduction; response to stimulus; detection of chemical stimulus involved in sensory perception of smell; G protein-coupled receptor signaling pathway
Sources:Amigo / QuickGO
Orthologs
Databases	NCBI: entry; OMA: entry
Species	Human	Mouse
Entrez	23538	18369
Ensembl	ENSG00000182070	ENSMUSG00000061626
UniProt	Q9UKL2	E9PYY2
RefSeq (mRNA)	NM_012375	NM_013620
RefSeq (protein)	NP_036507	NP_038648
Location (UCSC)	Chr 11: 5.15 – 5.15 Mb	Chr 7: 103.42 – 103.43 Mb
PubMed search
- Wikidata
View/Edit Human	View/Edit Mouse

Olfactory receptor 52A1 is a protein that in humans is encoded by the OR52A1 gene.

Olfactory receptors interact with odorant molecules in the nose, to initiate a neuronal response that triggers the perception of a smell. The olfactory receptor proteins are members of a large family of G-protein-coupled receptors (GPCR) arising from single coding-exon genes. Olfactory receptors share a 7-transmembrane domain structure with many neurotransmitter and hormone receptors and are responsible for the recognition and G protein-mediated transduction of odorant signals. The olfactory receptor gene family is the largest in the genome. The nomenclature assigned to the olfactory receptor genes and proteins for this organism is independent of other organisms.

== See also ==
- Olfactory receptor
