= PIGU =

Protein-coding gene in the species Homo sapiens

Identifiers
- Aliases: PIGU, CDC91L1, GAB1, phosphatidylinositol glycan anchor biosynthesis class U, GPIBD21, NEDBSS
- External IDs: OMIM: 608528; MGI: 3039607; HomoloGene: 6553; GeneCards: PIGU; OMA:PIGU - orthologs

Gene location (Human)
| Chr. | Chromosome 20 (human) |
| Band | 20q11.22 | Start | 34,560,542 bp |
| Band | 20q11.22 | End | 34,698,790 bp |

Gene location (Mouse)
| Chr. | Chromosome 2 (mouse) |
| Band | 2|2 H1 | Start | 155,120,163 bp |
| Band | 2|2 H1 | End | 155,199,350 bp |
RNA expression pattern
| Bgee | Human / Mouse (ortholog); Top expressed in: mucosa of transverse colon; ganglionic eminence; ventricular zone; islet of Langerhans; C1 segment; oocyte; tibialis anterior muscle; gonad; rectum; right uterine tube / Top expressed in: external carotid artery; internal carotid artery; genital tubercle; tail of embryo; muscle of thigh; yolk sac; right kidney; proximal tubule; conjunctival fornix; primary oocyte; More reference expression data |
| BioGPS | n/a |
Gene ontology
| Molecular function | GPI-anchor transamidase activity; GPI anchor binding |
| Cellular component | integral component of membrane; integral component of endoplasmic reticulum membrane; plasma membrane; endoplasmic reticulum membrane; membrane; endoplasmic reticulum; GPI-anchor transamidase complex |
| Biological process | GPI anchor biosynthetic process; regulation of receptor signaling pathway via JAK-STAT; attachment of GPI anchor to protein; protein localization to cell surface |
Sources:Amigo / QuickGO
Orthologs
| Species | Human | Mouse |
| Entrez | 128869 | 228812 |
| Ensembl | ENSG00000101464 | ENSMUSG00000038383 |
| UniProt | Q9H490 | Q3TAA8 |
| RefSeq (mRNA) | NM_080476 | NM_001004721 |
| RefSeq (protein) | NP_536724 | NP_001004721 |
| Location (UCSC) | Chr 20: 34.56 – 34.7 Mb | Chr 2: 155.12 – 155.2 Mb |
| PubMed search |
- Wikidata
| View/Edit Human | View/Edit Mouse |

Phosphatidylinositol glycan anchor biosynthesis class U protein is a protein that in humans is encoded by the PIGU gene.

The protein encoded by this gene shares similarity with Saccharomyces cerevisiae Cdc91, a predicted integral membrane protein that may function in cell division control. The protein encoded by this gene is the fifth subunit of GPI transamidase that attaches GPI-anchors to proteins.
