= PRPF40B =

Protein-coding gene in the species Homo sapiens

Identifiers
- Aliases: PRPF40B, HYPC, pre-mRNA processing factor 40 homolog B
- External IDs: MGI: 1925583; HomoloGene: 81828; GeneCards: PRPF40B; OMA:PRPF40B - orthologs

Gene location (Human)
Chr.	Chromosome 12 (human)
Band	12q13.12	Start	49,568,218 bp
Band	12q13.12	End	49,644,666 bp

Gene location (Mouse)
Chr.	Chromosome 15 (mouse)
Band	15|15 F1	Start	99,295,087 bp
Band	15|15 F1	End	99,317,018 bp
RNA expression pattern
Bgee	Human / Mouse (ortholog); Top expressed in: right lobe of thyroid gland; left lobe of thyroid gland; anterior pituitary; left testis; sural nerve; right testis; left ovary; right uterine tube; right ovary; canal of the cervix / Top expressed in: neural layer of retina; primary visual cortex; ventricular zone; superior frontal gyrus; genital tubercle; tail of embryo; dentate gyrus of hippocampal formation granule cell; spermatocyte; muscle of thigh; cerebellar cortex; More reference expression data
BioGPS	n/a
Gene ontology
Molecular function	RNA binding
Cellular component	U1 snRNP; nuclear speck; U2-type prespliceosome; nucleus
Biological process	mRNA splicing, via spliceosome; mRNA processing; RNA splicing; mRNA cis splicing, via spliceosome
Sources:Amigo / QuickGO
Orthologs
Species	Human	Mouse
Entrez	25766	54614
Ensembl	ENSG00000110844	ENSMUSG00000023007
UniProt	Q6NWY9	Q80W14
RefSeq (mRNA)	NM_001031698; NM_012272; NM_001363607; NM_001379030; NM_001379031 NM_001379032; NM_001379033; NM_001379034; NM_001379035; NM_001379036; NM_001379037	NM_018786; NM_001348256
RefSeq (protein)	NP_001026868; NP_036404; NP_001350536; NP_001365959; NP_001365960 NP_001365961; NP_001365962; NP_001365963; NP_001365964; NP_001365965; NP_001365966	NP_061256; NP_001335185; NP_001357561; NP_001357562; NP_001357563 NP_001357564
Location (UCSC)	Chr 12: 49.57 – 49.64 Mb	Chr 15: 99.3 – 99.32 Mb
PubMed search
- Wikidata
View/Edit Human	View/Edit Mouse

Pre-mRNA-processing factor 40 homolog B is a protein that in humans that is encoded by the PRPF40B gene.
