= OR56A3 =

Protein-coding gene in the species Homo sapiens

Identifiers
- Aliases: OR56A3, OR56A2P, OR56A3P, OR56A6, olfactory receptor family 56 subfamily A member 3
- External IDs: MGI: 3030515; GeneCards: OR56A3

Gene location (Human)
Chr.	Chromosome 11 (human)
Band	11p15.4	Start	5,938,751 bp
Band	11p15.4	End	5,951,347 bp

Gene location (Mouse)
Chr.	Chromosome 7 (mouse)
Band	7|7 E3	Start	104,766,043 bp
Band	7|7 E3	End	104,774,730 bp
RNA expression pattern
Bgee	Human / Mouse (ortholog); Top expressed in: testicle; gonad; placenta; left testis; right testis; myeloid leukocyte; monocyte; islet of Langerhans; prefrontal cortex; liver / Top expressed in: respiratory epithelium; nasal epithelium; olfactory epithelium; More reference expression data
BioGPS	n/a
Gene ontology
Molecular function	G protein-coupled receptor activity; olfactory receptor activity; signal transducer activity
Cellular component	integral component of membrane; plasma membrane; membrane
Biological process	sensory perception of smell; signal transduction; response to stimulus; detection of chemical stimulus involved in sensory perception of smell; G protein-coupled receptor signaling pathway
Sources:Amigo / QuickGO
Orthologs
Databases	NCBI: entry; OMA: entry
Species	Human	Mouse
Entrez	390083	404318
Ensembl	ENSG00000184478	ENSMUSG00000095248
UniProt	Q8NH54	Q3SXH8
RefSeq (mRNA)	NM_001003443	NM_207557
RefSeq (protein)	NP_001003443	NP_997440
Location (UCSC)	Chr 11: 5.94 – 5.95 Mb	Chr 7: 104.77 – 104.77 Mb
PubMed search
- Wikidata
View/Edit Human	View/Edit Mouse

Olfactory receptor 56A3 is a protein that in humans is encoded by the OR56A3 gene.

Olfactory receptors interact with odorant molecules in the nose, to initiate a neuronal response that triggers the perception of a smell. The olfactory receptor proteins are members of a large family of G-protein-coupled receptors (GPCR) arising from single coding-exon genes. Olfactory receptors share a 7-transmembrane domain structure with many neurotransmitter and hormone receptors and are responsible for the recognition and G protein-mediated transduction of odorant signals. The olfactory receptor gene family is the largest in the genome. The nomenclature assigned to the olfactory receptor genes and proteins for this organism is independent of other organisms.

== See also ==
- Olfactory receptor
