= OR8G5 =

Protein-coding gene in the species Homo sapiens

Identifiers
- Aliases: OR8G5, OR11-298, OR8G5P, OR8G6, olfactory receptor family 8 subfamily G member 5
- External IDs: MGI: 3030769; GeneCards: OR8G5

Gene location (Human)
Chr.	Chromosome 11 (human)
Band	11q24.2	Start	124,256,376 bp
Band	11q24.2	End	124,266,224 bp

Gene location (Mouse)
Chr.	Chromosome 9 (mouse)
Band	9|9 A5.1	Start	38,905,267 bp
Band	9|9 A5.1	End	38,910,979 bp
RNA expression pattern
Bgee	Human / Mouse (ortholog); Top expressed in: gonad; testicle; left testis; right testis; placenta; duodenum; transverse colon; urinary bladder; upper lobe of left lung; subcutaneous adipose tissue / Top expressed in: blastocyst; More reference expression data
BioGPS	n/a
Gene ontology
Molecular function	G protein-coupled receptor activity; odorant binding; olfactory receptor activity; signal transducer activity
Cellular component	integral component of membrane; plasma membrane; membrane
Biological process	sensory perception of smell; signal transduction; response to stimulus; detection of chemical stimulus involved in sensory perception of smell; G protein-coupled receptor signaling pathway
Sources:Amigo / QuickGO
Orthologs
Databases	NCBI: entry; OMA: entry
Species	Human	Mouse
Entrez	219865	258741
Ensembl	ENSG00000255298	ENSMUSG00000059595
UniProt	Q8NG78	Q8VG16
RefSeq (mRNA)	NM_001005198	NM_146746
RefSeq (protein)	NP_001005198	NP_666957
Location (UCSC)	Chr 11: 124.26 – 124.27 Mb	Chr 9: 38.91 – 38.91 Mb
PubMed search
- Wikidata
View/Edit Human	View/Edit Mouse

Olfactory receptor 8G5 is a protein that in humans is encoded by the OR8G5 gene.

Olfactory receptors interact with odorant molecules in the nose, to initiate a neuronal response that triggers the perception of a smell. The olfactory receptor proteins are members of a large family of G-protein-coupled receptors (GPCR) arising from single coding-exon genes. Olfactory receptors share a 7-transmembrane domain structure with many neurotransmitter and hormone receptors and are responsible for the recognition and G protein-mediated transduction of odorant signals. The olfactory receptor gene family is the largest in the genome. The nomenclature assigned to the olfactory receptor genes and proteins for this organism is independent of other organisms.

== See also ==
- Olfactory receptor
