= OR8G1 =

Protein-coding gene in the species Homo sapiens

Identifiers
- Aliases: OR8G1, HSTPCR25, OR8G1P, TPCR25, olfactory receptor family 8 subfamily G member 1 (gene/pseudogene), olfactory receptor family 8 subfamily G member 1
- External IDs: MGI: 3030801; GeneCards: OR8G1

Gene location (Human)
Chr.	Chromosome 11 (human)
Band	11q24.2	Start	124,241,095 bp
Band	11q24.2	End	124,254,364 bp

Gene location (Mouse)
Chr.	Chromosome 9 (mouse)
Band	9|9 A5.1	Start	39,657,545 bp
Band	9|9 A5.1	End	39,662,789 bp
RNA expression pattern
Bgee	Human / Mouse (ortholog); Top expressed in: testicle; secondary oocyte; gonad / n/a; More reference expression data
BioGPS	n/a
Gene ontology
Molecular function	G protein-coupled receptor activity; odorant binding; olfactory receptor activity; signal transducer activity
Cellular component	integral component of membrane; plasma membrane; membrane
Biological process	sensory perception of smell; signal transduction; response to stimulus; detection of chemical stimulus involved in sensory perception of smell; G protein-coupled receptor signaling pathway
Sources:Amigo / QuickGO
Orthologs
Databases	NCBI: entry; OMA: entry
Species	Human	Mouse
Entrez	26494	258086
Ensembl	ENSG00000197849	ENSMUSG00000055820
UniProt	Q15617	Q7TRA6
RefSeq (mRNA)	NM_001002905; NM_012379	NM_001011826
RefSeq (protein)	NP_001002905	NP_001011826
Location (UCSC)	Chr 11: 124.24 – 124.25 Mb	Chr 9: 39.66 – 39.66 Mb
PubMed search
- Wikidata
View/Edit Human	View/Edit Mouse

Olfactory receptor 8G1 is a protein that in humans is encoded by the OR8G1 gene.

Olfactory receptors interact with odorant molecules in the nose, to initiate a neuronal response that triggers the perception of a smell. The olfactory receptor proteins are members of a large family of G-protein-coupled receptors (GPCR) arising from single coding-exon genes. Olfactory receptors share a 7-transmembrane domain structure with many neurotransmitter and hormone receptors and are responsible for the recognition and G protein-mediated transduction of odorant signals. The olfactory receptor gene family is the largest in the genome. The nomenclature assigned to the olfactory receptor genes and proteins for this organism is independent of other organisms.

== See also ==
- Olfactory receptor
