= OR6K2 =

Protein-coding gene in humans

Identifiers
- Aliases: OR6K2, OR1-17, olfactory receptor family 6 subfamily K member 2
- External IDs: MGI: 3030254; GeneCards: OR6K2

Gene location (Human)
Chr.	Chromosome 1 (human)
Band	1q23.1	Start	158,699,678 bp
Band	1q23.1	End	158,700,652 bp

Gene location (Mouse)
Chr.	Chromosome 1 (mouse)
Band	1|1 H3	Start	173,983,199 bp
Band	1|1 H3	End	173,989,761 bp
RNA expression pattern
Bgee	Human / Mouse (ortholog); Top expressed in: prefrontal cortex; right auricle of heart / Top expressed in: bone marrow; abdomen; liver; More reference expression data
BioGPS	n/a
Gene ontology
Molecular function	G protein-coupled receptor activity; olfactory receptor activity; transmembrane signaling receptor activity; signal transducer activity
Cellular component	integral component of membrane; plasma membrane; membrane
Biological process	sensory perception of smell; detection of chemical stimulus involved in sensory perception of smell; detection of chemical stimulus involved in sensory perception; signal transduction; response to stimulus; G protein-coupled receptor signaling pathway
Sources:Amigo / QuickGO
Orthologs
Databases	NCBI: entry; OMA: entry
Species	Human	Mouse
Entrez	81448	258302
Ensembl	ENSG00000196171	ENSMUSG00000055033
UniProt	Q8NGY2	n/a
RefSeq (mRNA)	NM_001005279	NM_146305
RefSeq (protein)	NP_001005279	n/a
Location (UCSC)	Chr 1: 158.7 – 158.7 Mb	Chr 1: 173.98 – 173.99 Mb
PubMed search
- Wikidata
View/Edit Human	View/Edit Mouse

Olfactory receptor 6K2 is a protein that in humans is encoded by the OR6K2 gene.

Olfactory receptors interact with odorant molecules in the nose, to initiate a neuronal response that triggers the perception of a smell. The olfactory receptor proteins are members of a large family of G-protein-coupled receptors (GPCR) arising from single coding-exon genes. Olfactory receptors share a 7-transmembrane domain structure with many neurotransmitter and hormone receptors and are responsible for the recognition and G protein-mediated transduction of odorant signals. The olfactory receptor gene family is the largest in the genome. The nomenclature assigned to the olfactory receptor genes and proteins for this organism is independent of other organisms.

== See also ==
- Olfactory receptor
