= OR51Q1 =

Protein-coding gene in the species Homo sapiens

Identifiers
- Aliases: OR51Q1, olfactory receptor family 51 subfamily Q member 1 (gene/pseudogene), olfactory receptor family 51 subfamily Q member 1
- External IDs: MGI: 3030472; GeneCards: OR51Q1

Gene location (Human)
Chr.	Chromosome 11 (human)
Band	11p15.4	Start	5,422,111 bp
Band	11p15.4	End	5,423,206 bp

Gene location (Mouse)
Chr.	Chromosome 7 (mouse)
Band	7|7 E3	Start	103,647,953 bp
Band	7|7 E3	End	103,653,564 bp
RNA expression pattern
Bgee	Human / Mouse (ortholog); Top expressed in: sural nerve; gallbladder / n/a; More reference expression data
BioGPS	n/a
Gene ontology
Molecular function	G protein-coupled receptor activity; olfactory receptor activity; signal transducer activity
Cellular component	integral component of membrane; plasma membrane; membrane
Biological process	sensory perception of smell; signal transduction; response to stimulus; detection of chemical stimulus involved in sensory perception of smell; G protein-coupled receptor signaling pathway
Sources:Amigo / QuickGO
Orthologs
Databases	NCBI: entry; OMA: entry
Species	Human	Mouse
Entrez	390061	259124
Ensembl	ENSG00000167360	ENSMUSG00000094063
UniProt	Q8NH59	Q8VH20
RefSeq (mRNA)	NM_001004757	NM_147120
RefSeq (protein)	NP_001004757	NP_667331
Location (UCSC)	Chr 11: 5.42 – 5.42 Mb	Chr 7: 103.65 – 103.65 Mb
PubMed search
- Wikidata
View/Edit Human	View/Edit Mouse

Olfactory receptor 51Q1 is a protein that in humans is encoded by the OR51Q1 gene.

== Function ==
Olfactory receptors interact with odorant molecules in the nose, to initiate a neuronal response that triggers the perception of a smell. The olfactory receptor proteins are members of a large family of G-protein-coupled receptors (GPCR) arising from single coding-exon genes. Olfactory receptors share a 7-transmembrane domain structure with many neurotransmitter and hormone receptors and are responsible for the recognition and G protein-mediated transduction of odorant signals. The olfactory receptor gene family is the largest in the genome. The nomenclature assigned to the olfactory receptor genes and proteins for this organism is independent of other organisms.

== See also ==
- Olfactory receptor
