= OR6N2 =

Protein-coding gene in humans

Identifiers
- Aliases: OR6N2, OR1-23, olfactory receptor family 6 subfamily N member 2
- External IDs: MGI: 3030264; GeneCards: OR6N2

Gene location (Human)
Chr.	Chromosome 1 (human)
Band	1q23.1	Start	158,774,222 bp
Band	1q23.1	End	158,781,204 bp

Gene location (Mouse)
Chr.	Chromosome 1 (mouse)
Band	1|1 H3	Start	173,894,171 bp
Band	1|1 H3	End	173,899,839 bp
RNA expression pattern
Bgee	Human / Mouse (ortholog); Top expressed in: bone marrow; bone marrow cell / n/a; More reference expression data
BioGPS	n/a
Gene ontology
Molecular function	G protein-coupled receptor activity; olfactory receptor activity; transmembrane signaling receptor activity; signal transducer activity
Cellular component	integral component of membrane; plasma membrane; membrane
Biological process	sensory perception of smell; detection of chemical stimulus involved in sensory perception of smell; detection of chemical stimulus involved in sensory perception; signal transduction; response to stimulus; G protein-coupled receptor signaling pathway
Sources:Amigo / QuickGO
Orthologs
Databases	NCBI: entry; OMA: entry
Species	Human	Mouse
Entrez	81442	258713
Ensembl	ENSG00000188340	ENSMUSG00000050134
UniProt	Q8NGY6	E9Q5F1
RefSeq (mRNA)	NM_001005278	NM_146718
RefSeq (protein)	NP_001005278	NP_666929
Location (UCSC)	Chr 1: 158.77 – 158.78 Mb	Chr 1: 173.89 – 173.9 Mb
PubMed search
- Wikidata
View/Edit Human	View/Edit Mouse

Olfactory receptor 6N2 is a protein that in humans is encoded by the OR6N2 gene.

Olfactory receptors interact with odorant molecules in the nose, to initiate a neuronal response that triggers the perception of a smell. The olfactory receptor proteins are members of a large family of G-protein-coupled receptors (GPCR) arising from single coding-exon genes. Olfactory receptors share a 7-transmembrane domain structure with many neurotransmitter and hormone receptors and are responsible for the recognition and G protein-mediated transduction of odorant signals. The olfactory receptor gene family is the largest in the genome. The nomenclature assigned to the olfactory receptor genes and proteins for this organism is independent of other organisms.

== See also ==
- Olfactory receptor
