= OR51M1 =

Protein-coding gene in the species Homo sapiens

Identifiers
- Aliases: OR51M1, HOR5'Beta7, OR11-40, olfactory receptor family 51 subfamily M member 1
- External IDs: MGI: 3030465; GeneCards: OR51M1

Gene location (Human)
Chr.	Chromosome 11 (human)
Band	11p15.4	Start	5,383,812 bp
Band	11p15.4	End	5,393,263 bp

Gene location (Mouse)
Chr.	Chromosome 7 (mouse)
Band	7|7 E3	Start	103,578,032 bp
Band	7|7 E3	End	103,578,991 bp
RNA expression pattern
Bgee	Human / Mouse (ortholog); Top expressed in: testicle; apex of heart / n/a; More reference expression data
BioGPS	n/a
Gene ontology
Molecular function	G protein-coupled receptor activity; olfactory receptor activity; signal transducer activity
Cellular component	integral component of membrane; plasma membrane; membrane
Biological process	sensory perception of smell; signal transduction; response to stimulus; detection of chemical stimulus involved in sensory perception of smell; G protein-coupled receptor signaling pathway
Sources:Amigo / QuickGO
Orthologs
Databases	NCBI: entry; OMA: entry
Species	Human	Mouse
Entrez	390059	258961
Ensembl	ENSG00000184698	ENSMUSG00000042219
UniProt	Q9H341	F8VPJ9
RefSeq (mRNA)	NM_001004756	NM_001271020; NM_146959
RefSeq (protein)	NP_001004756	NP_001257949
Location (UCSC)	Chr 11: 5.38 – 5.39 Mb	Chr 7: 103.58 – 103.58 Mb
PubMed search
- Wikidata
View/Edit Human	View/Edit Mouse

Olfactory receptor 51M1 is a protein that in humans is encoded by the OR51M1 gene.

== Function ==
Olfactory receptors interact with odorant molecules in the nose, to initiate a neuronal response that triggers the perception of a smell. The olfactory receptor proteins are members of a large family of G-protein-coupled receptors (GPCR) arising from single coding-exon genes. Olfactory receptors share a 7-transmembrane domain structure with many neurotransmitter and hormone receptors and are responsible for the recognition and G protein-mediated transduction of odorant signals. The olfactory receptor gene family is the largest in the genome. The nomenclature assigned to the olfactory receptor genes and proteins for this organism is independent of other organisms.

== See also ==
- Olfactory receptor
