= OR10A5 =

Protein-coding gene in the species Homo sapiens

Identifiers
- Aliases: OR10A5, JCG6, OR10A1, OR11-403, olfactory receptor family 10 subfamily A member 5
- External IDs: OMIM: 608493; MGI: 3030547; GeneCards: OR10A5

Gene location (Human)
Chr.	Chromosome 11 (human)
Band	11p15.4	Start	6,845,683 bp
Band	11p15.4	End	6,846,636 bp

Gene location (Mouse)
Chr.	Chromosome 7 (mouse)
Band	7|7 E3	Start	106,630,381 bp
Band	7|7 E3	End	106,640,201 bp
RNA expression pattern
Bgee	Human / Mouse (ortholog); Top expressed in: testicle; corpus callosum / n/a; More reference expression data
BioGPS	n/a
Gene ontology
Molecular function	G protein-coupled receptor activity; olfactory receptor activity; signal transducer activity
Cellular component	integral component of membrane; plasma membrane; membrane
Biological process	sensory perception of smell; signal transduction; response to stimulus; detection of chemical stimulus involved in sensory perception of smell; G protein-coupled receptor signaling pathway
Sources:Amigo / QuickGO
Orthologs
Databases	NCBI: entry; OMA: entry
Species	Human	Mouse
Entrez	144124	259036
Ensembl	ENSG00000166363	ENSMUSG00000073898
UniProt	Q9H207	n/a
RefSeq (mRNA)	NM_178168	NM_147034
RefSeq (protein)	NP_835462	n/a
Location (UCSC)	Chr 11: 6.85 – 6.85 Mb	Chr 7: 106.63 – 106.64 Mb
PubMed search
- Wikidata
View/Edit Human	View/Edit Mouse

Olfactory receptor 10A5 (OR10A5) is a protein that in humans is encoded by the OR10A5 gene.

Olfactory receptors interact with odorant molecules in the nose, to initiate a neuronal response that triggers the perception of a smell. The olfactory receptor proteins are members of a large family of G-protein-coupled receptors (GPCR) arising from single coding-exon genes. Olfactory receptors share a 7-transmembrane domain structure with many neurotransmitter and hormone receptors and are responsible for the recognition and G protein-mediated transduction of odorant signals. The olfactory receptor gene family is the largest in the genome. The nomenclature assigned to the olfactory receptor genes and proteins for this organism is independent of other organisms.

== See also ==
- Olfactory receptor
