= OR5M8 =

Protein-coding gene in the species Homo sapiens

Identifiers
- Aliases: OR5M8, OR11-194, olfactory receptor family 5 subfamily M member 8
- External IDs: MGI: 3030865; GeneCards: OR5M8

Gene location (Human)
Chr.	Chromosome 11 (human)
Band	11q12.1	Start	56,490,435 bp
Band	11q12.1	End	56,491,370 bp

Gene location (Mouse)
Chr.	Chromosome 2 (mouse)
Band	2|2 D	Start	85,820,648 bp
Band	2|2 D	End	85,824,048 bp
RNA expression pattern
Bgee	Human / Mouse (ortholog); Top expressed in: thoracic aorta; ascending aorta; testicle / n/a; More reference expression data
BioGPS	n/a
Gene ontology
Molecular function	G protein-coupled receptor activity; odorant binding; olfactory receptor activity; signal transducer activity
Cellular component	integral component of membrane; plasma membrane; membrane
Biological process	sensory perception of smell; signal transduction; response to stimulus; detection of chemical stimulus involved in sensory perception of smell; G protein-coupled receptor signaling pathway
Sources:Amigo / QuickGO
Orthologs
Databases	NCBI: entry; OMA: entry
Species	Human	Mouse
Entrez	219484	257916
Ensembl	ENSG00000181371	ENSMUSG00000043267
UniProt	Q8NGP6	Q7TR87
RefSeq (mRNA)	NM_001005282	NM_001011759
RefSeq (protein)	NP_001005282	NP_001011759
Location (UCSC)	Chr 11: 56.49 – 56.49 Mb	Chr 2: 85.82 – 85.82 Mb
PubMed search
- Wikidata
View/Edit Human	View/Edit Mouse

Olfactory receptor 5M8 is a protein that in humans is encoded by the OR5M8 gene.

Olfactory receptors interact with odorant molecules in the nose, to initiate a neuronal response that triggers the perception of a smell. The olfactory receptor proteins are members of a large family of G-protein-coupled receptors (GPCR) arising from single coding-exon genes. Olfactory receptors share a 7-transmembrane domain structure with many neurotransmitter and hormone receptors and are responsible for the recognition and G protein-mediated transduction of odorant signals. The olfactory receptor gene family is the largest in the genome. The nomenclature assigned to the olfactory receptor genes and proteins for this organism is independent of other organisms.

== See also ==
- Olfactory receptor
