= OR7G1 =

Protein-coding gene in the species Homo sapiens

Identifiers
- Aliases: OR7G1, OR19-15, OR19-8, OR7G1P, olfactory receptor family 7 subfamily G member 1
- External IDs: MGI: 3030688; GeneCards: OR7G1

Gene location (Human)
Chr.	Chromosome 19 (human)
Band	19p13.2	Start	9,114,828 bp
Band	19p13.2	End	9,115,763 bp

Gene location (Mouse)
Chr.	Chromosome 9 (mouse)
Band	9|9 A2	Start	19,477,731 bp
Band	9|9 A2	End	19,478,678 bp
RNA expression pattern
Bgee	Human / Mouse (ortholog); Top expressed in: blood; multicellular organism / n/a; More reference expression data
BioGPS	n/a
Gene ontology
Molecular function	G protein-coupled receptor activity; signal transducer activity; olfactory receptor activity
Cellular component	plasma membrane; membrane; integral component of membrane
Biological process	sensory perception of smell; detection of chemical stimulus involved in sensory perception of smell; signal transduction; response to stimulus; G protein-coupled receptor signaling pathway
Sources:Amigo / QuickGO
Orthologs
Databases	NCBI: entry; OMA: entry
Species	Human	Mouse
Entrez	125962	258515
Ensembl	ENSG00000161807	ENSMUSG00000095667
UniProt	Q8NGA0	n/a
RefSeq (mRNA)	NM_001005192	NM_146522
RefSeq (protein)	NP_001005192	n/a
Location (UCSC)	Chr 19: 9.11 – 9.12 Mb	Chr 9: 19.48 – 19.48 Mb
PubMed search
- Wikidata
View/Edit Human	View/Edit Mouse

Olfactory receptor 7G1 is a protein that in humans is encoded by the OR7G1 gene.

Olfactory receptors interact with odorant molecules in the nose, to initiate a neuronal response that triggers the perception of a smell. The olfactory receptor proteins are members of a large family of G-protein-coupled receptors (GPCR) arising from single coding-exon genes. Olfactory receptors share a 7-transmembrane domain structure with many neurotransmitter and hormone receptors and are responsible for the recognition and G protein-mediated transduction of odorant signals. The olfactory receptor gene family is the largest in the genome. The nomenclature assigned to the olfactory receptor genes and proteins for this organism is independent of other organisms.

== See also ==
- Olfactory receptor
