= OR8J1 =

Protein-coding gene in the species Homo sapiens

Identifiers
- Aliases: OR8J1, OR11-183, olfactory receptor family 8 subfamily J member 1
- External IDs: MGI: 3030891; GeneCards: OR8J1

Gene location (Human)
Chr.	Chromosome 11 (human)
Band	11q12.1	Start	56,354,291 bp
Band	11q12.1	End	56,361,511 bp

Gene location (Mouse)
Chr.	Chromosome 2 (mouse)
Band	2|2 D	Start	86,202,905 bp
Band	2|2 D	End	86,208,737 bp
RNA expression pattern
Bgee	Human / Mouse (ortholog); Top expressed in: gonad / n/a; More reference expression data
BioGPS	n/a
Gene ontology
Molecular function	G protein-coupled receptor activity; odorant binding; olfactory receptor activity; signal transducer activity
Cellular component	integral component of membrane; plasma membrane; membrane
Biological process	sensory perception of smell; signal transduction; response to stimulus; detection of chemical stimulus involved in sensory perception of smell; G protein-coupled receptor signaling pathway
Sources:Amigo / QuickGO
Orthologs
Databases	NCBI: entry; OMA: entry
Species	Human	Mouse
Entrez	219477	404325
Ensembl	ENSG00000262796; ENSG00000172487	ENSMUSG00000075187
UniProt	Q8NGP2	Q7TR75
RefSeq (mRNA)	NM_001005205	NM_207563
RefSeq (protein)	NP_001005205	NP_997446
Location (UCSC)	Chr 11: 56.35 – 56.36 Mb	Chr 2: 86.2 – 86.21 Mb
PubMed search
- Wikidata
View/Edit Human	View/Edit Mouse

Olfactory receptor 8J1 is a protein that in humans is encoded by the OR8J1 gene.

Olfactory receptors interact with odorant molecules in the nose, to initiate a neuronal response that triggers the perception of a smell. The olfactory receptor proteins are members of a large family of G-protein-coupled receptors (GPCR) arising from single coding-exon genes. Olfactory receptors share a 7-transmembrane domain structure with many neurotransmitter and hormone receptors and are responsible for the recognition and G protein-mediated transduction of odorant signals. The olfactory receptor gene family is the largest in the genome. The nomenclature assigned to the olfactory receptor genes and proteins for this organism is independent of other organisms.

== See also ==
- Olfactory receptor
