= OR6C3 =

Protein-coding gene in the species Homo sapiens

Identifiers
- Aliases: OR6C3, OST709, olfactory receptor family 6 subfamily C member 3
- External IDs: MGI: 3030637; GeneCards: OR6C3

Gene location (Human)
Chr.	Chromosome 12 (human)
Band	12q13.2	Start	55,330,043 bp
Band	12q13.2	End	55,332,687 bp

Gene location (Mouse)
Chr.	Chromosome 10 (mouse)
Band	10|10 D3	Start	129,526,490 bp
Band	10|10 D3	End	129,530,155 bp
RNA expression pattern
Bgee	Human / Mouse (ortholog); Top expressed in: gonad; fundus / n/a; More reference expression data
BioGPS	n/a
Gene ontology
Molecular function	signal transducer activity; G protein-coupled receptor activity; olfactory receptor activity
Cellular component	plasma membrane; membrane; integral component of membrane
Biological process	signal transduction; response to stimulus; sensory perception of smell; detection of chemical stimulus involved in sensory perception of smell; G protein-coupled receptor signaling pathway
Sources:Amigo / QuickGO
Orthologs
Databases	NCBI: entry; OMA: entry
Species	Human	Mouse
Entrez	254786	258547
Ensembl	ENSG00000205329	ENSMUSG00000046041
UniProt	Q9NZP0	Q8VFI3
RefSeq (mRNA)	NM_054104; NM_001388498	NM_146554
RefSeq (protein)	NP_473445	NP_666765
Location (UCSC)	Chr 12: 55.33 – 55.33 Mb	Chr 10: 129.53 – 129.53 Mb
PubMed search
- Wikidata
View/Edit Human	View/Edit Mouse

Olfactory receptor 6C3 is a protein that in humans is encoded by the OR6C3 gene.

Olfactory receptors interact with odorant molecules in the nose, to initiate a neuronal response that triggers the perception of a smell. The olfactory receptor proteins are members of a large family of G-protein-coupled receptors (GPCR) arising from single coding-exon genes. Olfactory receptors share a 7-transmembrane domain structure with many neurotransmitter and hormone receptors and are responsible for the recognition and G protein-mediated transduction of odorant signals. The olfactory receptor gene family is the largest in the genome. The nomenclature assigned to the olfactory receptor genes and proteins for this organism is independent of other organisms.

== See also ==
- Olfactory receptor
