= OR51B5 =

Protein-coding gene in the species Homo sapiens

Identifiers
- Aliases: OR51B5, HOR5'Beta5, OR11-37, olfactory receptor family 51 subfamily B member 5
- External IDs: GeneCards: OR51B5

Gene location (Human)
Chr.	Chromosome 11 (human)
Band	11p15.4	Start	5,303,444 bp
Band	11p15.4	End	5,505,652 bp
RNA expression pattern
Bgee	Human / Mouse (ortholog); Top expressed in: gonad; testicle; secondary oocyte; right ovary; right uterine tube; Achilles tendon; left ovary; cervix; right adrenal cortex; olfactory zone of nasal mucosa / n/a; More reference expression data
BioGPS	n/a
Gene ontology
Molecular function	signal transducer activity; olfactory receptor activity; G protein-coupled receptor activity
Cellular component	membrane; integral component of membrane; plasma membrane
Biological process	sensory perception of smell; signal transduction; response to stimulus; detection of chemical stimulus involved in sensory perception of smell; G protein-coupled receptor signaling pathway
Sources:Amigo / QuickGO
Orthologs
Databases	NCBI: entry; OMA: entry
Species	Human	Mouse
Entrez	282763	n/a
Ensembl	ENSG00000167355	n/a
UniProt	Q9H339	n/a
RefSeq (mRNA)	NM_001005567; NM_001395252	n/a
RefSeq (protein)	NP_001005567	n/a
Location (UCSC)	Chr 11: 5.3 – 5.51 Mb	n/a
PubMed search		n/a
- Wikidata
View/Edit Human

Olfactory receptor 51B5 is a protein that in humans is encoded by the OR51B5 gene.

Olfactory receptors interact with odorant molecules in the nose, to initiate a neuronal response that triggers the perception of a smell. The olfactory receptor proteins are members of a large family of G-protein-coupled receptors (GPCR) arising from single coding-exon genes. Olfactory receptors share a 7-transmembrane domain structure with many neurotransmitter and hormone receptors and are responsible for the recognition and G protein-mediated transduction of odorant signals. The olfactory receptor gene family is the largest in the genome. The nomenclature assigned to the olfactory receptor genes and proteins for this organism is independent of other organisms.

== See also ==
- Olfactory receptor
