= OR5B3 =

Protein-coding gene in the species Homo sapiens

Identifiers
- Aliases: OR5B3, OR11-239, OR5B13, OST129, olfactory receptor family 5 subfamily B member 3
- External IDs: MGI: 3031297; GeneCards: OR5B3

Gene location (Human)
Chr.	Chromosome 11 (human)
Band	11q12.1	Start	58,402,464 bp
Band	11q12.1	End	58,406,874 bp

Gene location (Mouse)
Chr.	Chromosome 19 (mouse)
Band	19|19 A	Start	13,208,692 bp
Band	19|19 A	End	13,213,764 bp
Gene ontology
Molecular function	G protein-coupled receptor activity; odorant binding; olfactory receptor activity; signal transducer activity
Cellular component	integral component of membrane; plasma membrane; membrane
Biological process	sensory perception of smell; signal transduction; response to stimulus; detection of chemical stimulus involved in sensory perception of smell; G protein-coupled receptor signaling pathway
Sources:Amigo / QuickGO
Orthologs
Databases	NCBI: entry; OMA: entry
Species	Human	Mouse
Entrez	441608	258120
Ensembl	ENSG00000172769	ENSMUSG00000096365
UniProt	Q8NH48	Q7TQR3
RefSeq (mRNA)	NM_001005469	NM_001011840
RefSeq (protein)	NP_001005469	NP_001011840
Location (UCSC)	Chr 11: 58.4 – 58.41 Mb	Chr 19: 13.21 – 13.21 Mb
PubMed search
- Wikidata
View/Edit Human	View/Edit Mouse

Olfactory receptor 5B3 is a protein that in humans is encoded by the OR5B3 gene.

Olfactory receptors interact with odorant molecules in the nose, to initiate a neuronal response that triggers the perception of a smell. The olfactory receptor proteins are members of a large family of G-protein-coupled receptors (GPCR) arising from single coding-exon genes. Olfactory receptors share a 7-transmembrane domain structure with many neurotransmitter and hormone receptors and are responsible for the recognition and G-protein-mediated transduction of odorant signals. The olfactory receptor gene family is the largest in the genome. The nomenclature assigned to the olfactory receptor genes and proteins for this organism is independent of other organisms.

== See also ==
- Olfactory receptor
