= OR8I2 =

Protein-coding gene in the species Homo sapiens

Identifiers
- Aliases: OR8I2, OR11-170, olfactory receptor family 8 subfamily I member 2
- External IDs: MGI: 3030938; GeneCards: OR8I2

Gene location (Human)
Chr.	Chromosome 11 (human)
Band	11q12.1	Start	56,093,308 bp
Band	11q12.1	End	56,094,240 bp

Gene location (Mouse)
Chr.	Chromosome 2 (mouse)
Band	2|2 D	Start	86,851,047 bp
Band	2|2 D	End	86,857,424 bp
Gene ontology
Molecular function	G protein-coupled receptor activity; signal transducer activity; olfactory receptor activity; odorant binding
Cellular component	integral component of membrane; plasma membrane; membrane
Biological process	response to stimulus; signal transduction; sensory perception of smell; detection of chemical stimulus involved in sensory perception of smell; G protein-coupled receptor signaling pathway
Sources:Amigo / QuickGO
Orthologs
Databases	NCBI: entry; OMA: entry
Species	Human	Mouse
Entrez	120586	258763
Ensembl	ENSG00000172154	ENSMUSG00000075166
UniProt	Q8N0Y5	A2AVB5
RefSeq (mRNA)	NM_001003750	NM_146767
RefSeq (protein)	NP_001003750	NP_666978
Location (UCSC)	Chr 11: 56.09 – 56.09 Mb	Chr 2: 86.85 – 86.86 Mb
PubMed search
- Wikidata
View/Edit Human	View/Edit Mouse

Olfactory receptor 8I2 is a protein that in humans is encoded by the OR8I2 gene.

Olfactory receptors interact with odorant molecules in the nose, to initiate a neuronal response that triggers the perception of a smell. The olfactory receptor proteins are members of a large family of G-protein-coupled receptors (GPCR) arising from single coding-exon genes. Olfactory receptors share a 7-transmembrane domain structure with many neurotransmitter and hormone receptors and are responsible for the recognition and G protein-mediated transduction of odorant signals. The olfactory receptor gene family is the largest in the genome. The nomenclature assigned to the olfactory receptor genes and proteins for this organism is independent of other organisms.

== See also ==
- Olfactory receptor
