= Protein phosphatase =

Class of enzymes

A protein phosphatase is a phosphatase enzyme that removes a phosphate group from the phosphorylated amino acid residue of its substrate protein. Protein phosphorylation is one of the most common forms of reversible protein posttranslational modification (PTM), with up to 30% of all proteins being phosphorylated at any given time. Protein kinases (PKs) are the effectors of phosphorylation and catalyse the transfer of a γ-phosphate from ATP to specific amino acids on proteins. Several hundred PKs exist in mammals and are classified into distinct super-families. Proteins are phosphorylated predominantly on Ser, Thr and Tyr residues, which account for 79.3, 16.9 and 3.8% respectively of the phosphoproteome, at least in mammals. In contrast, protein phosphatases (PPs) are the primary effectors of dephosphorylation and can be grouped into three main classes based on sequence, structure and catalytic function. The largest class of PPs is the phosphoprotein phosphatase (PPP) family comprising PP1, PP2A, PP2B, PP4, PP5, PP6 and PP7, and the protein phosphatase Mg^{2+}- or Mn^{2+}-dependent (PPM) family, composed primarily of PP2C. The protein Tyr phosphatase (PTP) super-family forms the second group, and the aspartate-based protein phosphatases the third. The protein pseudophosphatases form part of the larger phosphatase family, and in most cases are thought to be catalytically inert, instead functioning as phosphate-binding proteins, integrators of signalling or subcellular traps. Examples of membrane-spanning protein phosphatases containing both active (phosphatase) and inactive (pseudophosphatase) domains linked in tandem are known, conceptually similar to the kinase and pseudokinase domain polypeptide structure of the JAK pseudokinases. A complete comparative analysis of human phosphatases and pseudophosphatases has been completed by Manning and colleagues, forming a companion piece to the ground-breaking analysis of the human kinome, which encodes the complete set of ~536 human protein kinases.

== Mechanism ==
Phosphorylation involves the transfer of phosphate groups from ATP to the enzyme, the energy for which comes from hydrolysing ATP into ADP or AMP. However, dephosphorylation releases phosphates into solution as free ions, because attaching them back to ATP would require energy input.

Cysteine-dependent phosphatases (CDPs) catalyse the hydrolysis of a phosphoester bond via a phospho-cysteine intermediate.

Mechanism of Tyrosine dephosphorylation by a CDP

The free cysteine nucleophile forms a bond with the phosphorus atom of the phosphate moiety, and the P-O bond linking the phosphate group to the tyrosine is protonated, either by a suitably positioned acidic amino acid residue (Asp in the diagram below) or a water molecule. The phospho-cysteine intermediate is then hydrolysed by another water molecule, thus regenerating the active site for another dephosphorylation reaction.

Metallo-phosphatases (e.g. PP2C) co-ordinate 2 catalytically essential metal ions within their active site. There is currently some confusion of the identity of these metal ions, as successive attempts to identify them yield different answers. There is currently evidence that these metals could be magnesium, manganese, iron, zinc, or any combination thereof. It is thought that a hydroxyl ion bridging the two metal ions takes part in nucleophilic attack on the phosphorus ion.

== Sub-types ==
Phosphatases can be subdivided based upon their substrate specificity.

Class	Example	Substrate	Reference
Tyrosine-specific phosphatases	PTP1B	Phosphotyrosine	
Serine-/threonine-specific phosphatases	PP2C (PPP2CA)	Phosphoserine/-threonine	
Dual specificity phosphatases	VHR, DUSP1–DUSP28	Phosphotyrosine/-serine/-threonine	
Histidine phosphatase	PHP	Phospho-Histidine	

=== Serine/threonine PP (PPM/PPP) families ===
Protein Ser/Thr phosphatases were originally classified using biochemical assays as either, type 1 (PP1) or type 2 (PP2), and were further subdivided based on metal-ion requirement (PP2A, no metal ion; PP2B, Ca^{2+} stimulated; PP2C, Mg^{2+} dependent) (Moorhead et al., 2007). The protein Ser/Thr phosphatases PP1, PP2A and PP2B of the PPP family, together with PP2C of the PPM family, account for the majority of Ser/Thr PP activity in vivo (Barford et al., 1998). In the brain, they are present in different subcellular compartments in neuronal and glial cells, and contribute to different neuronal functions.

=== PPM ===
The PPM family, which includes PP2C and pyruvate dehydrogenase phosphatase, are enzymes with Mn^{2+}/Mg^{2+} metal ions that are resistant to classic inhibitors and toxins of the PPP family. Unlike most PPPs, PP2C exists in only one subunit but, like PTPs, it displays a wide variety of structural domains that confer unique functions. In addition, PP2C does not seem to be evolutionarily related to the major family of Ser/Thr PPs and has no sequence homology to ancient PPP enzymes. The current assumption is that PPMs evolved separately from PPPs but converged during evolutionary development.

=== Class I: Cys-based PTPs ===
Class I PTPs constitute the largest family. They contain the well-known classical receptor (a) and non-receptor PTPs (b), which are strictly tyrosine-specific, and the DSPs (c) which target Ser/Thr as well as Tyr and are the most diverse in terms of substrate specificity.

=== Class III: Cys-based PTPs ===
The third class of PTPs contains three cell cycle regulators, CDC25A, CDC25B and CDC25C, which dephosphorylate CDKs at their N-terminal, a reaction required to drive progression of the cell cycle. They are themselves regulated by phosphorylation and are degraded in response to DNA damage to prevent chromosomal abnormalities.

=== Class IV: Asp-based DSPs ===
The haloacid dehalogenase (HAD) superfamily is a further PP group that uses Asp as a nucleophile and was recently shown to have dual-specificity. These PPs can target both Ser and Tyr, but are thought to have greater specificity towards Tyr. A subfamily of HADs, the Eyes Absent Family (Eya), are also transcription factors and can therefore regulate their own phosphorylation and that of transcriptional cofactor/s, and contribute to the control of gene transcription. The combination of these two functions in Eya reveals a greater complexity of transcriptional gene control than previously thought . A further member of this class is the RNA polymerase II C-terminal domain phosphatase. While this family remains poorly understood, it is known to play important roles in development and nuclear morphology.

== Alternative Structural Classification ==
Many phosphatases are promiscuous with respect to substrate type, or can evolve quickly to change substrate. An alternative structural classification notes that 20 distinct protein folds have phosphatase activity, and 10 of these contain protein phosphatases.

- The CC1 fold is the most common, and includes tyrosine-specific (PTP), dual-specific (DSP) and even lipid-specific (PTEN) families.
- The major serine/threonine-specific folds are PPM (PP2C) and PPPL (PPP).
- The only known histidine phosphatases is in the PHP fold.
- Other folds encode phosphatases that act on various combination of pSer, pThr, pTyr, and non-protein substrates (CC2, CC3, HAD, HP, AP, RTR1).

== Physiological relevance ==
Phosphatases act in opposition to kinases/phosphorylases, which add phosphate groups to proteins. The addition of a phosphate group may activate or de-activate an enzyme (e.g., kinase signalling pathways) or enable a protein-protein interaction to occur (e.g., SH2 domains); therefore phosphatases are integral to many signal transduction pathways. Phosphate addition and removal do not necessarily correspond to enzyme activation or inhibition, and that several enzymes have separate phosphorylation sites for activating or inhibiting functional regulation. CDK, for example, can be either activated or deactivated depending on the specific amino acid residue being phosphorylated. Phosphates are important in signal transduction because they regulate the proteins to which they are attached. To reverse the regulatory effect, the phosphate is removed. This occurs on its own by hydrolysis, or is mediated by protein phosphatases.

Protein phosphorylation plays a crucial role in biological functions and controls nearly every cellular process, including metabolism, gene transcription and translation, cell-cycle progression, cytoskeletal rearrangement, protein-protein interactions, protein stability, cell movement, and apoptosis. These processes depend on the highly regulated and opposing actions of PKs and PPs, through changes in the phosphorylation of key proteins. Histone phosphorylation, along with methylation, ubiquitination, sumoylation and acetylation, also regulates access to DNA through chromatin reorganisation.

One of the major switches for neuronal activity is the activation of PKs and PPs by elevated intracellular calcium. The degree of activation of the various isoforms of PKs and PPs is controlled by their individual sensitivities to calcium. Furthermore, a wide range of specific inhibitors and targeting partners such as scaffolding, anchoring, and adaptor proteins also contribute to the control of PKs and PPs and recruit them into signalling complexes in neuronal cells. Such signalling complexes typically act to bring PKs and PPs in close proximity with target substrates and signalling molecules as well as enhance their selectivity by restricting accessibility to these substrate proteins. Phosphorylation events, therefore, are controlled not only by the balanced activity of PKs and PPs but also by their restricted localisation. Regulatory subunits and domains serve to restrict specific proteins to particular subcellular compartments and to modulate protein specificity. These regulators are essential for maintaining the coordinated action of signalling cascades, which in neuronal cells include short-term (synaptic) and long-term (nuclear) signalling. These functions are, in part, controlled by allosteric modification by secondary messengers and reversible protein phosphorylation.

It is thought that around 30% of known PPs are present in all tissues, with the rest showing some level of tissue restriction. While protein phosphorylation is a cell-wide regulatory mechanism, recent quantitative proteomics studies have shown that phosphorylation preferentially targets nuclear proteins. Many PPs that regulate nuclear events, are often enriched or exclusively present in the nucleus. In neuronal cells, PPs are present in multiple cellular compartments and play a critical role at both pre- and post-synapses, in the cytoplasm and in the nucleus where they regulate gene expression.

Phosphoprotein phosphatase is activated by the hormone insulin, which indicates that there is a high concentration of glucose in the blood. The enzyme then acts to dephosphorylate other enzymes, such as phosphorylase kinase, glycogen phosphorylase, and glycogen synthase. This leads to phosphorylase kinase and glycogen phosphorylase's becoming inactive, while glycogen synthase is activated. As a result, glycogen synthesis is increased and glycogenolysis is decreased, and the net effect is for energy to enter and be stored inside the cell.

== Learning and memory ==
In the adult brain, PPs are essential for synaptic functions and are involved in the negative regulation of higher-order brain functions such as learning and memory. Dysregulation of their activity has been linked to several disorders including cognitive ageing and neurodegeneration, as well as cancer, diabetes and obesity.

== Examples ==
Human genes that encode proteins with phosphoprotein phosphatase activity include:

=== Protein serine/threonine phosphatase ===
- PPP1CA, PPP1CB, PPP1CC, PPP2CA, PPP2CB, PPP3CA, PPP3CB, PPP3CC, PPP4C
- PPP5C, PPP6C

=== Protein tyrosine phosphatase ===
- CDC14s: CDC14A, CDC14B, CDC14C, CDKN3
- Phosphatase and tensin homologs: PTEN
- slingshot: SSH1, SSH2, SSH3

=== Dual-specificity phosphatase ===
- DUSP1, DUSP2, DUSP3, DUSP4, DUSP5, DUSP6, DUSP7, DUSP8, DUSP9
- DUSP10, DUSP11, DUSP12, DUSP13A, DUSP13B, DUSP14, DUSP15, DUSP16, DUSP18, DUSP19
- DUSP21, DUSP22, DUSP23, DUSP26, DUSP27, DUSP28

=== Ungrouped ===
- CTDP1
- CTDSP1, CTDSP2, CTDSPL
- DULLARD
- EPM2A
- ILKAP
- MDSP
- PGAM5
- PHLPP1, PHLPP2
- PPEF1, PPEF2
- PPM1A, PPM1B, PPM1D, PPM1E, PPM1F, PPM1G, PPM1H, PPM1J, PPM1K, PPM1L, PPM1M, PPM1N
- PPTC7
- PTPMT1
- SSU72
- UBLCP1
