= MAPK phosphatase =

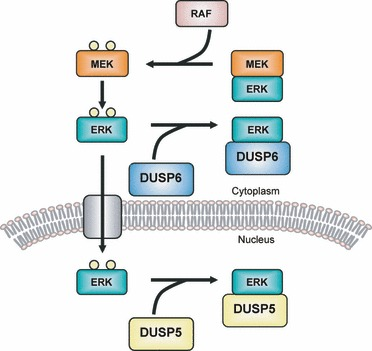
The figure shows the interaction and cooperation of MEK, DUSP5 and DUSP6/MKP-3 within the cytoplasmic region and the nucleus. RAF activates MEK. Activated MEK phoshorylates ERK which can now be transported across the cell membrane by a transporter. Dephosphorylated ERK cannot leave the nucleus.

MAPK phosphatases (MKPs) are the largest class of phosphatases involved in down-regulating Mitogen-activated protein kinases (MAPK) signaling. MAPK signalling pathways regulate multiple features of development and homeostasis. This can involve gene regulation, cell proliferation, programmed cell death and stress responses. MAPK phosphatases are therefore important regulator components of these pathways.

== Function ==
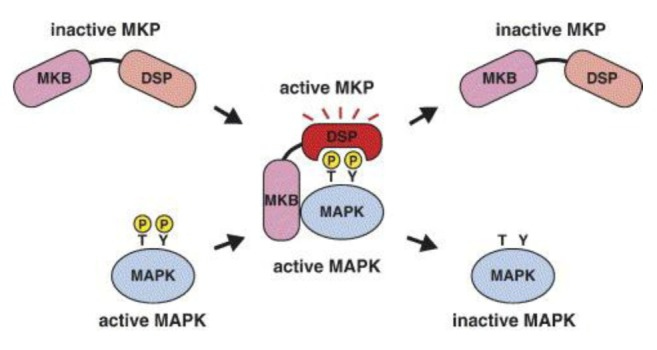
When activated MAPK binds to MKB this causes a conformational change of the DUSP region which activates MKP and activated MKP dephosphorylates MAPK thereby inactivating it.

MAPK phosphatases are only found in eukaryotes and negatively regulate MAP kinases to act as negative feedback. MKPs are also known as dual-specificity phosphatases (DUSPs) because they deactivate MAPK by dephosphorylating the Threonine and the Tyrosine residues residing in MAPKs activation site. MKPs have a catalytic region at their C-terminus and a regulatory region at their N-terminus. The position where the MAPK binds to MKP is found near the N-terminus of MKP. The binding is due to the electrostatic interactions of the positively charged residues on the MKP binding portion with the negatively charged residues on the MAPK binding site.

== Classification ==
There are 10 main MKPs that can be further broken down into three sub-classes which are representative of either their genomic structure or the type of substrate (MAPK) they bind to. These include DUSP1, DUSP2, DUSP4 and DUSP5 that belong to subgroup 1. DUSP6, DUSP7, DUSP9 and DUSP10 belong to subgroup 2. DUSP8 and DUSP16 belong to subgroup 3, these subgroups are based on the genomic structure of the MKPs. The newest MKP-8 brings the total MKPs to 11, MKP-8 plays a role in inhibiting p38 kinase.

Dual specificity phosphatases (DUSPs) also belong to the family of protein tyrosine phosphatases. MKPs are grouped into type I, II and III; in which type I MKPs are located in the nuclear region, type II are located in the cytoplasmic region and type III are located in both the nuclear and cytoplasmic region. The different locations of these three types of MKPs allow for them to cause different types of signaling. For example, MKP-1 (a type I MKP) controls gene expression by inactivating the subcellular group of MAPKs. Note that without the LXXLL motif (GFP-MKP-1_{47-367}) the MKP-1 cannot localize inside the nucleus and it comes before the CH2A domain. The newest MKP, MKP-8, belongs to group I because it is located in the nuclear region of the cell A recent study shows that histone deacetylase isoforms (HDAC1, -2, and -3) deacetylate MKP-1 and that this post-translational modification increases MAPK signaling and innate immune signaling.

Although the N-terminal region is the quite distinct between each MKP, they all normally contain CH2 domains. In MKP-1, MAPK binds to the active site that is between the CH2A and CHB domains located in the N-terminal.

An example of a type II MKP is MKP-3 which, regulates the activity of ERK2 by deposphorylating it and holding it in the cytoplasmic region. MKP-3 also binds to ERK2 regardless of whether it is phosphorylated or not. MKP-4 is another MKP that belongs to Type I and, is distinct from other MKPs in this subgroup because it is only found in placenta, kidney and embryonic liver cells. MKP-5 is a type III MKP that binds specifically to p38 and SPK/JNK and is found both in the cytoplasmic and nuclear regions of a cell. MKP-5 is only located in the heart, lung, liver, kidney and skeletal muscle cells. There are also MKPs that belong to a group called Atypical MKPs. For example, Vaccina H1-related (VHR) is an atypical MKP because it only has the DUSP region. VHR is only found in lymphoid and hematopoietic cells, and it inactivates the ERK1/2 and JNKs in T-cell receptors. VHR also induces cell cycle arrest.

Name	Alt. name	Sub Group
DUSP1	MKP-1	I
DUSP2		I
DUSP4	MKP-2	I
DUSP5		I
DUSP6	MKP-3	II
DUSP7		II
DUSP8		III
DUSP9	MKP-4	II
DUSP10	MKP-5	?
DUSP14	MKP-6	?
DUSP16	MKP-7	III
DUSP26	MKP-8	I
