= Rhodanese =

Mitochondrial enzyme which breaks down cyanide

Rhodanese-like domain
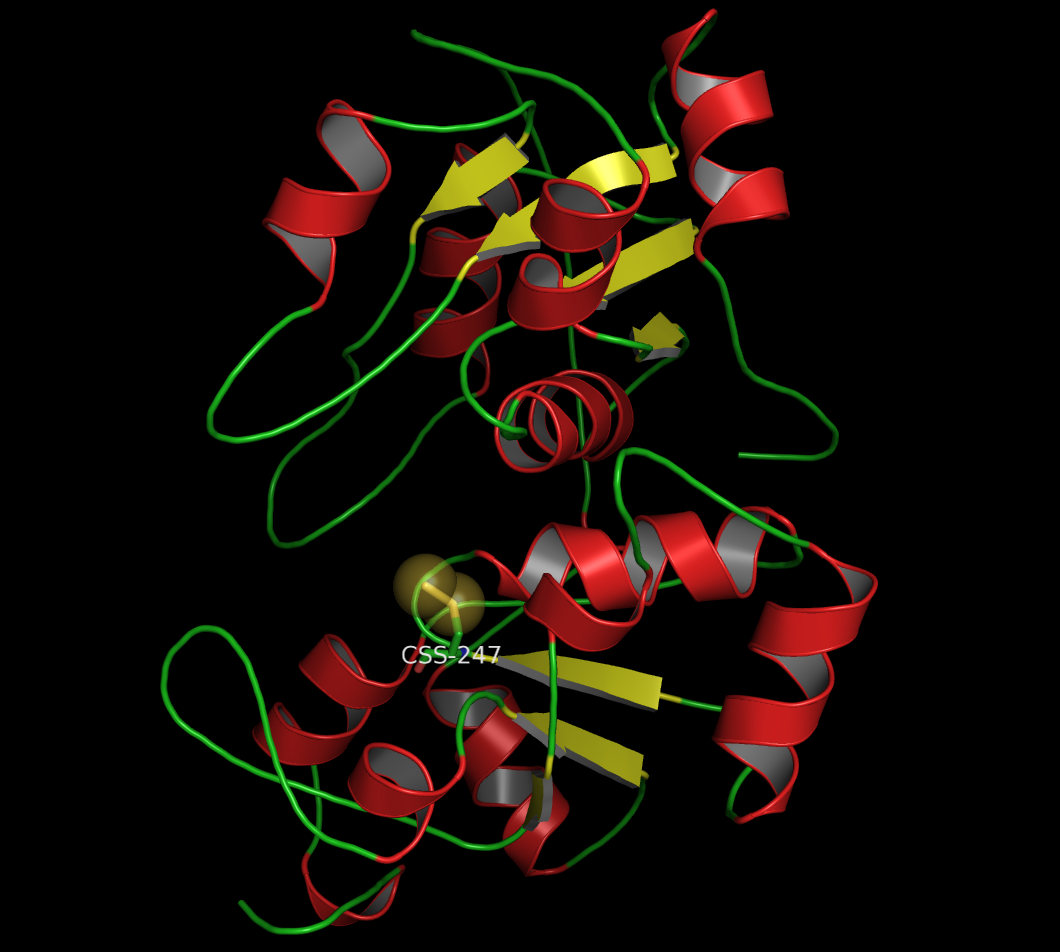
- Crystallographically-determined structure of rhodanese (PDB: 1BOH)

Identifiers
- Symbol: Rhodanese
- Pfam: PF00581
- InterPro: IPR001763
- PROSITE: PDOC00322
- SCOP2: 2ora / SCOPe / SUPFAM
- OPM superfamily: 413
- OPM protein: 2mpn
- CDD: cd00158
- Membranome: 571
Available protein structures:
- PDB: IPR001763 PF00581 (ECOD; PDBsum)
- AlphaFold: IPR001763; PF00581

thiosulfate sulfurtransferase

Identifiers
- EC no.: 2.8.1.1
- CAS no.: 9026-04-4

Databases
- BRENDA: enzyme data
- ExPASy: NiceZyme view
- KEGG: enzyme entry
- MetaCyc: metabolic pathway
- Rhea: reactions
- PDB structures: RCSB PDB PDBe PDBsum
- Gene Ontology: AmiGO / QuickGO
Search
- PMC: articles
- PubMed: articles
- NCBI: proteins

Rhodanese is a mitochondrial enzyme that detoxifies cyanide (CN^{−}) by converting it to thiocyanate (SCN^{−}, also known as "rhodanate"). In enzymatology, the common name is listed as thiosulfate sulfurtransferase (EC 2.8.1.1). It catalyzes the following reaction:

thiosulfate + cyanide $\rightleftharpoons$ sulfite + thiocyanate

== Structure and mechanism ==
This reaction takes place in two steps. In the first step, thiosulfate is reduced by the thiol group on cysteine-247 (1), to form a hydropersulfide and a sulfite (2). In the second step, the persulfide reacts with cyanide to produce thiocyanate, re-generating the cysteine thiol (1).

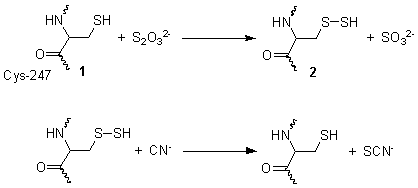

Rhodanese shares evolutionary relationship with a large family of proteins, including:

- Cdc25 phosphatase catalytic domain
- non-catalytic domains of eukaryotic dual-specificity MAPK-phosphatases
- non-catalytic domains of yeast PTP-type MAPK-phosphatases
- non-catalytic domains of yeast Ubp4, Ubp5, Ubp7
- non-catalytic domains of mammalian Ubp-Y
- Drosophila heat shock protein HSP-67BB
- several bacterial cold-shock and phage shock proteins
- plant senescence associated proteins
- catalytic and non-catalytic domains of rhodanese

Rhodanese has an internal duplication. This domain is found as a single copy in other proteins, including phosphatases and ubiquitin C-terminal hydrolases.

While cyanide is the most well-characterized sulfur acceptor from rhodanese, biological thiols such as glutathione are capable of acting as acceptors to form free low-molecular weight hydropersulfides such as glutathione hydropersulfide.

== Clinical relevance ==
This reaction is important for the treatment of exposure to cyanide, since the thiocyanate formed is around 1 / 200 as toxic.^{:p. 15938} The use of thiosulfate solution as an antidote for cyanide poisoning is based on the activation of this enzymatic cycle.

== Human proteins ==
The human mitochondrial rhodanese gene is TST.

The following other human genes match the "Rhodanese-like" domain on InterPro, but are not the rodanase with its catalytic activity (see also the list of related families in #Structure and mechanism):

- M-phase inducer phosphatase: CDC25A; CDC25B; CDC25C;
- Dual specificity protein phosphatase: DUSP; DUSP1; DUSP2; DUSP4; DUSP5; DUSP6; DUSP7; DUSP10; DUSP16, aka MKP7;
- Thiosulfate:glutathione sulfurtransferase: KAT, now known as "TSTD1";
- Adenylyltransferase and sulfurtransferase: MOCS3;
- 3-mercaptopyruvate sulfurtransferase: MPST, also known as "TSTD2"
- Not an enzyme: TBCK; TSGA14;
- Ubiquitin carboxyl-terminal hydrolase: USP8;
- Unknown activity: TSTD3

== Nomenclature ==
Although the standard nomenclature rules for enzymes indicate that their names are to end with the letters "-ase", rhodanese was first described in 1933, prior to the 1955 establishment of the Enzyme Commission; as such, the older name had already attained widespread usage.

The systematic name of this enzyme class is "thiosulfate:cyanide sulfurtransferase". Other names in common use include "thiosulfate cyanide transsulfurase", "thiosulfate thiotransferase", "rhodanese", and "rhodanase".

Probably from ῥόδον (ródon), meaning rose, in reference to rhodanic acid which has a red colour with ferric salts.
