= Phosphopyruvate dehydrogenase phosphatase =

Phosphopyruvate dehydrogenase phosphatase may refer to:

- (pyruvate dehydrogenase (acetyl-transferring))-phosphatase, an enzyme
- Phosphoprotein phosphatase, an enzyme
