= PPP1R27 =

Protein-coding gene in the species Homo sapiens

Identifiers
- Aliases: PPP1R27, DYSFIP1, protein phosphatase 1 regulatory subunit 27
- External IDs: MGI: 1915951; GeneCards: PPP1R27

Gene location (Human)
Chr.	Chromosome 17 (human)
Band	17q25.3	Start	81,833,492 bp
Band	17q25.3	End	81,835,050 bp

Gene location (Mouse)
Chr.	Chromosome 11 (mouse)
Band	11|11 E2	Start	120,440,805 bp
Band	11|11 E2	End	120,441,958 bp
RNA expression pattern
Bgee	Human / Mouse (ortholog); Top expressed in: muscle of thigh; gastrocnemius muscle; skeletal muscle tissue; pituitary gland; anterior pituitary; bone marrow; left testis; right adrenal gland; right adrenal cortex; right testis / Top expressed in: soleus muscle; knee joint; temporal muscle; medial head of gastrocnemius muscle; quadriceps femoris muscle; vastus lateralis muscle; triceps brachii muscle; intercostal muscle; sternocleidomastoid muscle; otolith organ; More reference expression data
BioGPS	n/a
Orthologs
Databases	NCBI: entry; OMA: entry
Species	Human	Mouse
Entrez	116729	68701
Ensembl	ENSG00000182676; ENSG00000288186	ENSMUSG00000025129
UniProt	Q86WC6	Q9D119
RefSeq (mRNA)	NM_001007533	NM_026814
RefSeq (protein)	NP_001007534	NP_081090
Location (UCSC)	Chr 17: 81.83 – 81.84 Mb	Chr 11: 120.44 – 120.44 Mb
PubMed search
- Wikidata
View/Edit Human	View/Edit Mouse

Protein phosphatase 1, regulatory subunit 27 is a protein in humans that is encoded by the PPP1R27 gene.

== See also ==
- Protein phosphatase
  - Protein phosphatase 1
