= PABIR1 =

Protein-coding gene in the species Homo sapiens

Identifiers
- Aliases: PABIR1, C9orf42, family with sequence similarity 122A, PP2A Aalpha (PPP2R1A) and B55A (PPP2R2A) interacting phosphatase regulator 1, FAM122A
- External IDs: OMIM: 617249; MGI: 1915284; GeneCards: PABIR1

Gene location (Human)
| Chr. | Chromosome 9 (human) |
| Band | 9q21.11 | Start | 68,780,065 bp |
| Band | 9q21.11 | End | 68,785,566 bp |

Gene location (Mouse)
| Chr. | Chromosome 19 (mouse) |
| Band | 19|19 B | Start | 24,453,866 bp |
| Band | 19|19 B | End | 24,454,720 bp |
RNA expression pattern
| Bgee | Human / Mouse (ortholog); Top expressed in: secondary oocyte; pancreatic epithelial cell; tibialis anterior muscle; biceps brachii; Skeletal muscle tissue of biceps brachii; deltoid muscle; right ventricle; popliteal artery; tibial arteries; retinal pigment epithelium / Top expressed in: retinal pigment epithelium; Rostral migratory stream; secondary oocyte; zygote; Epithelium of choroid plexus; primary oocyte; internal carotid artery; islet of Langerhans; external carotid artery; ciliary body; More reference expression data |
| BioGPS | n/a |
Orthologs
| Databases | NCBI: entry; OMA: entry |
| Species | Human | Mouse |
| Entrez | 116224 | 68034 |
| Ensembl | ENSG00000187866 | ENSMUSG00000074922 |
| UniProt | Q96E09 | Q9DB52 |
| RefSeq (mRNA) | NM_138333 | NM_026520 |
| RefSeq (protein) | NP_612206 | NP_080796 |
| Location (UCSC) | Chr 9: 68.78 – 68.79 Mb | Chr 19: 24.45 – 24.45 Mb |
| PubMed search |
- Wikidata
| View/Edit Human | View/Edit Mouse |

PPP2R1A-PPP2R2A-interacting phosphatase regulator 1 is a protein that in humans is encoded by the PABIR1 gene. The PABIR1 protein acts to promote cell growth and the progression of mitosis (specifically the G2/M checkpoint). It does this by inhibiting the protein phosphatase PP2A by binding to PPP2R2A and PPP2CA, and blocking their substrate binding site and active site respectively.

== See also ==
- PABIR2
- PABIR3
