= DSAP =

DSAP may refer to:

- Destination Service Access Point, a part of the IEEE 802.2 standard for local area network communication
- Defense Satellite Application Program, a series of American military weather satellites, later renamed to Defense Meteorological Satellite Program
- Disseminated superficial actinic porokeratosis, a human skin condition possibly related to mutations in the gene SSH1
- Durational Shortage Area Permit, a form of temporary teacher certification for subject areas with teacher shortages
- Deputy Sheriffs' Association of Pennsylvania
- Deutsche Sozialistische Arbeiterpartei in Polen, the German Socialist Workers' Party in Poland
- German Social Democratic Workers Party in the Czechoslovak Republic (DSAP, Deutsche sozialdemokratische Arbeiterpartei in der Tschechoslowakischen Republik)
