= TST (gene) =

Protein-coding gene in the species Homo sapiens

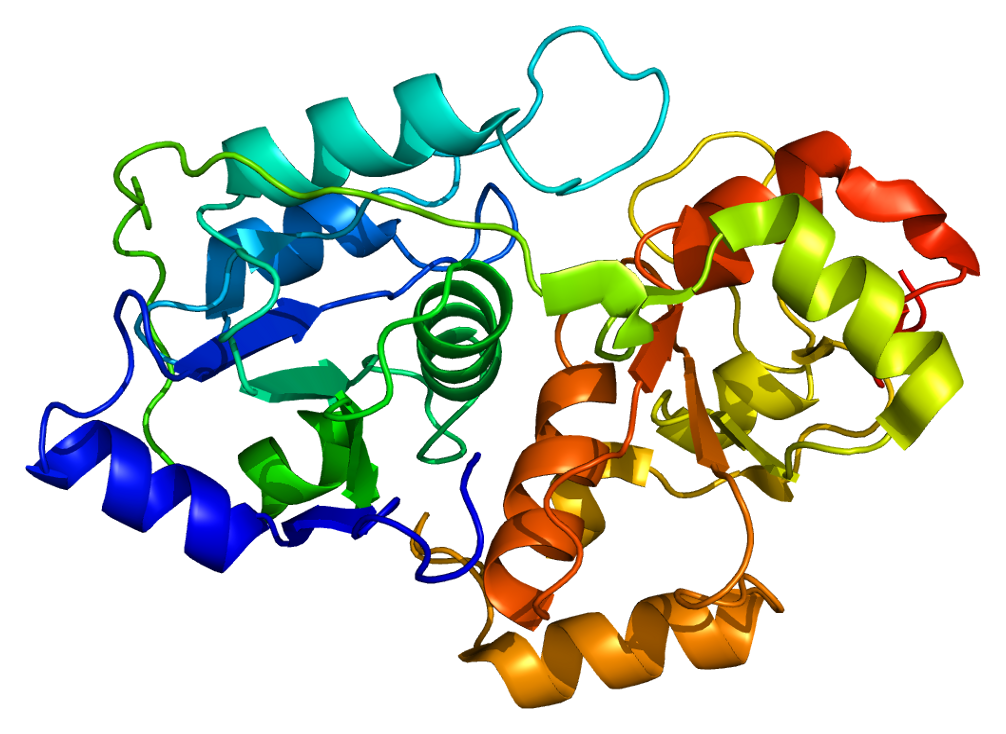

Identifiers
- Aliases: TST, RDS, thiosulfate sulfurtransferase
- External IDs: OMIM: 180370; MGI: 98852; HomoloGene: 37759; GeneCards: TST; OMA:TST - orthologs

Gene location (Human)
Chr.	Chromosome 22 (human)
Band	22q12.3	Start	37,010,859 bp
Band	22q12.3	End	37,020,183 bp

Gene location (Mouse)
Chr.	Chromosome 15 (mouse)
Band	15 E1|15 37.47 cM	Start	78,283,756 bp
Band	15 E1|15 37.47 cM	End	78,290,107 bp
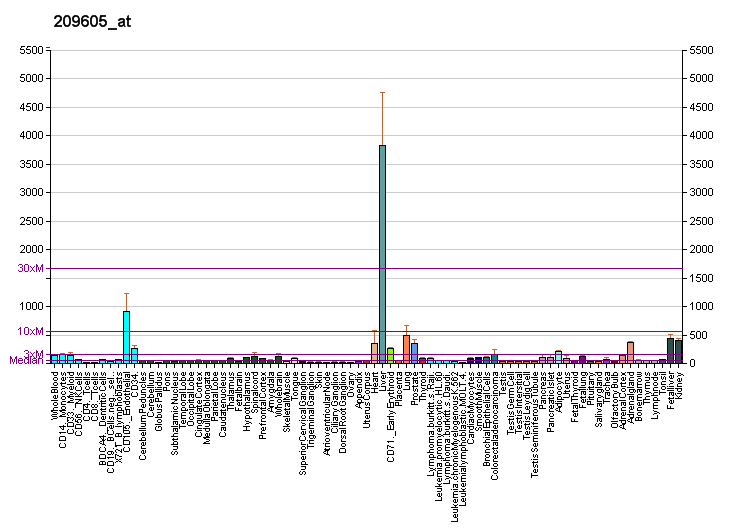
RNA expression pattern
Bgee	Human / Mouse (ortholog); Top expressed in: mucosa of transverse colon; right lobe of liver; mucosa of sigmoid colon; mucosa of ileum; right adrenal cortex; jejunal mucosa; duodenum; left adrenal gland; left adrenal cortex; kidney tubule / Top expressed in: olfactory epithelium; left lobe of liver; pyloric antrum; gastric mucosa; mucous cell of stomach; epithelium of stomach; esophagus; adrenal gland; left colon; optic nerve; More reference expression data
BioGPS	More reference expression data
Gene ontology
Molecular function	transferase activity; 5S rRNA binding; thiosulfate sulfurtransferase activity; RNA binding
Cellular component	mitochondrial inner membrane; extracellular exosome; mitochondrion; mitochondrial matrix; extracellular space
Biological process	rRNA transport; rRNA import into mitochondrion; epithelial cell differentiation; cyanate catabolic process; sulfur amino acid catabolic process
Sources:Amigo / QuickGO
Orthologs
Species	Human	Mouse
Entrez	7263	22117
Ensembl	ENSG00000128311	ENSMUSG00000044986
UniProt	Q16762	P52196
RefSeq (mRNA)	NM_003312; NM_001270483	NM_009437
RefSeq (protein)	NP_001257412; NP_003303	NP_033463
Location (UCSC)	Chr 22: 37.01 – 37.02 Mb	Chr 15: 78.28 – 78.29 Mb
PubMed search
- Wikidata
View/Edit Human	View/Edit Mouse

Thiosulfate sulfurtransferase is an enzyme that in humans is encoded by the TST gene.

The product of this gene is a mitochondrial matrix enzyme that is encoded by the nucleus. It may play roles in cyanide detoxification, the formation of iron-sulfur proteins, and the modification of sulfur-containing enzymes.

The gene product contains two highly conservative domains (rhodanese homology domains), suggesting these domains have a common evolutionary origin.
