= PABIR family member 2 =

Protein-coding gene in the species Homo sapiens

PABIR2

Identifiers
- Aliases: PABIR2, SPACIA2, family with sequence similarity 122B, PABIR family member 2, FAM122B
- External IDs: MGI: 1926005; GeneCards: PABIR2

Gene location (Human)
Chr.	X chromosome (human)
Band	Xq26.3	Start	134,769,566 bp
Band	Xq26.3	End	134,797,232 bp

Gene location (Mouse)
Chr.	X chromosome (mouse)
Band	X|X A5	Start	52,332,292 bp
Band	X|X A5	End	52,358,682 bp
RNA expression pattern
Bgee	Human / Mouse (ortholog); Top expressed in: endothelial cell; germinal epithelium; pancreatic epithelial cell; Brodmann area 23; thymus; epithelium of nasopharynx; mucosa of ileum; secondary oocyte; palpebral conjunctiva; primary visual cortex / Top expressed in: superior cervical ganglion; atrioventricular valve; zygote; umbilical cord; lumbar spinal ganglion; toe; secondary oocyte; atrium; dermis; second toe; More reference expression data
BioGPS	n/a
Orthologs
Databases	NCBI: entry; OMA: entry
Species	Human	Mouse
Entrez	159090	78755
Ensembl	ENSG00000156504	ENSMUSG00000036022
UniProt	Q7Z309	Q6NZE7
RefSeq (mRNA)	NM_001166599; NM_001166600; NM_001170756; NM_001170757; NM_145284 NM_001331088; NM_001331089; NM_001331090; NM_001331091; NM_001331092; NM_001331093; NM_001331094; NM_001387468; NM_001387469	NM_001166365; NM_001166583; NM_030167
RefSeq (protein)	NP_001160071; NP_001160072; NP_001164227; NP_001164228; NP_001318017 NP_001318018; NP_001318019; NP_001318020; NP_001318021; NP_001318022; NP_001318023; NP_660327	NP_001159837; NP_001160055; NP_084443
Location (UCSC)	Chr X: 134.77 – 134.8 Mb	Chr X: 52.33 – 52.36 Mb
PubMed search
- Wikidata
View/Edit Human	View/Edit Mouse

PABIR family member 2 is a protein that in humans is encoded by the PABIR2 gene (previously FAM122B). Not much has been reported about the function of this protein, but it is predicted to act as a collagen trimer.

== See also ==
- PABIR1
- PABIR3
