= STYXL2 =

Protein-coding gene in humans

Identifiers
- Aliases: STYXL2, dual specificity phosphatase 27 (putative), dual specificity phosphatase 27, atypical, serine/threonine/tyrosine interacting like 2, DUSP27
- External IDs: MGI: 2685055; GeneCards: STYXL2

Gene location (Human)
Chr.	Chromosome 1 (human)
Band	1q24.1	Start	167,094,075 bp
Band	1q24.1	End	167,129,165 bp

Gene location (Mouse)
Chr.	Chromosome 1 (mouse)
Band	1|1 H2.3	Start	165,925,717 bp
Band	1|1 H2.3	End	165,955,491 bp
RNA expression pattern
Bgee	Human / Mouse (ortholog); Top expressed in: myocardium of left ventricle; cardiac muscle tissue of right atrium; tibialis anterior muscle; Skeletal muscle tissue of rectus abdominis; deltoid muscle; apex of heart; right ventricle; quadriceps femoris muscle; vastus lateralis muscle; biceps brachii / Top expressed in: interventricular septum; knee joint; medial head of gastrocnemius muscle; soleus muscle; muscle of thigh; quadriceps femoris muscle; skeletal muscle tissue; tibialis anterior muscle; temporal muscle; triceps brachii muscle; More reference expression data
BioGPS	n/a
Gene ontology
Molecular function	protein tyrosine/serine/threonine phosphatase activity; phosphatase activity
Cellular component	cytoplasm; sarcomere
Biological process	protein dephosphorylation; dephosphorylation
Sources:Amigo / QuickGO
Orthologs
Databases	NCBI: entry; OMA: entry
Species	Human	Mouse
Entrez	92235	240892
Ensembl	ENSG00000198842	ENSMUSG00000026564
UniProt	Q5VZP5	Q148W8
RefSeq (mRNA)	NM_001080426	NM_001033344; NM_001160049
RefSeq (protein)	NP_001073895	NP_001028516; NP_001153521
Location (UCSC)	Chr 1: 167.09 – 167.13 Mb	Chr 1: 165.93 – 165.96 Mb
PubMed search
- Wikidata
View/Edit Human	View/Edit Mouse

Serine/threonine/tyrosine-interacting-like 2 is a protein that in humans is encoded by the STYXL2 gene (previously DUSP27). Though it is homologous to certain dual-specificity phosphatases, a conserved cysteine in the putative active site has been replaced by a serine, suggesting that it may no longer function as a phosphatase.
