= PABIR family member 3 =

Protein-coding gene in the species Homo sapiens

PABIR3

Identifiers
- Aliases: PABIR3, family with sequence similarity 122C, PABIR family member 3, FAM122C
- External IDs: GeneCards: PABIR3

Gene location (Human)
Chr.	X chromosome (human)
Band	Xq26.3	Start	134,796,395 bp
Band	Xq26.3	End	134,854,835 bp
RNA expression pattern
Bgee	Human / Mouse (ortholog); Top expressed in: gonad; left ovary; bone marrow cell; right ovary; testicle; monocyte; right testis; left testis; ventricular zone; ganglionic eminence / n/a; More reference expression data
BioGPS	n/a
Orthologs
Databases	NCBI: entry; OMA: entry
Species	Human	Mouse
Entrez	159091	n/a
Ensembl	ENSG00000156500	n/a
UniProt	Q6P4D5	n/a
RefSeq (mRNA)	NM_001170779; NM_001170780; NM_001170781; NM_001170782; NM_001170783 NM_001170784; NM_138819; NM_001365743; NM_001365744; NM_001365745; NM_001365746; NM_001365747; NM_001365748; NM_001388440; NM_001388441; NM_001388442; NM_001388443; NM_001388444; NM_001388445; NM_001388446; NM_001388447; NM_001388448; NM_001388449	n/a
RefSeq (protein)	NP_001164250; NP_001164251; NP_001164252; NP_001164253; NP_001164254 NP_001164255; NP_620174; NP_001352672; NP_001352673; NP_001352674; NP_001352675; NP_001352676; NP_001352677	n/a
Location (UCSC)	Chr X: 134.8 – 134.85 Mb	n/a
PubMed search		n/a
- Wikidata
View/Edit Human

PABIR family member 3 is a protein that in humans is encoded by the PABNIR3 gene (previously FAM122C).

== See also ==
- PABIR1
- PABIR2
