= DUSP15 =

Protein-coding gene in the species Homo sapiens

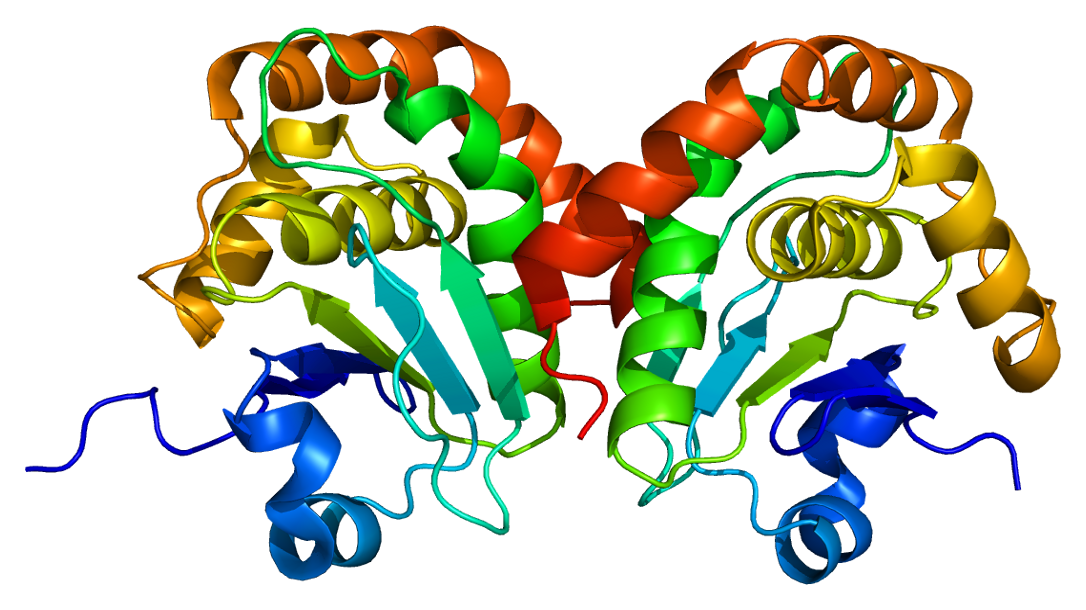

Identifiers
- Aliases: DUSP15, VHY, C20orf57, dual specificity phosphatase 15
- External IDs: OMIM: 616776; MGI: 1934928; GeneCards: DUSP15
Available structures
PDB	Ortholog search: PDBe RCSB
PDB	List of PDB id codes 1YZ4
Enzyme activity
EC #	BRENDA	ExPASy	KEGG	MetaCyc
3.1.3.16	↗	↗	↗	↗
3.1.3.48	↗	↗	↗	↗

Gene location (Human)
Chr.	Chromosome 20 (human)
Band	20q11.21	Start	31,847,637 bp
Band	20q11.21	End	31,870,664 bp

Gene location (Mouse)
Chr.	Chromosome 2 (mouse)
Band	2|2 H1	Start	152,782,917 bp
Band	2|2 H1	End	152,793,618 bp
RNA expression pattern
Bgee	Human / Mouse (ortholog); Top expressed in: left testis; right testis; tibial nerve; human kidney; sperm; testicle; C1 segment; Descending thoracic aorta; right coronary artery; vena cava / Top expressed in: sciatic nerve; spermatocyte; spermatid; seminiferous tubule; deep cerebellar nuclei; pontine nuclei; epithelium of lens; cerebellar cortex; anterior horn of spinal cord; medial vestibular nucleus; More reference expression data
BioGPS	n/a
Gene ontology
Molecular function	phosphoprotein phosphatase activity; hydrolase activity; protein binding; phosphatase activity; protein tyrosine phosphatase activity; protein tyrosine/serine/threonine phosphatase activity
Cellular component	membrane; cytoplasm; cytosol; plasma membrane
Biological process	positive regulation of JNK cascade; transforming growth factor beta receptor signaling pathway; protein dephosphorylation; regulation of cell population proliferation; peptidyl-tyrosine dephosphorylation; dephosphorylation; regulation of oligodendrocyte differentiation
Sources:Amigo / QuickGO
Orthologs
Databases	NCBI: entry; OMA: entry
Species	Human	Mouse
Entrez	128853	252864
Ensembl	ENSG00000149599	ENSMUSG00000042662
UniProt	Q9H1R2	Q8R4V2
RefSeq (mRNA)	NM_177991; NM_001012644; NM_080611; NM_001320478; NM_001320479	NM_001159376; NM_145744
RefSeq (protein)	NP_001012662; NP_001307407; NP_001307408; NP_542178; NP_817130	NP_001152848; NP_665687
Location (UCSC)	Chr 20: 31.85 – 31.87 Mb	Chr 2: 152.78 – 152.79 Mb
PubMed search
- Wikidata
View/Edit Human	View/Edit Mouse

Dual specificity protein phosphatase 15 is an enzyme that in humans is encoded by the DUSP15 gene.

The protein encoded by this gene belongs to the non-receptor class of the protein-tyrosine phosphatase family. The encoded protein has both protein-tyrosine phosphatase activity and serine/threonine-specific phosphatase activity, and therefore is known as a dual specificity phosphatase. Three transcript variants, encoding two different isoforms have been found for this gene.
