= DUSP12 =

Protein-coding gene in humans

Identifiers
- Aliases: DUSP12, DUSP1, YVH1, dual specificity phosphatase 12
- External IDs: OMIM: 604835; MGI: 1890614; GeneCards: DUSP12
Available structures
| PDB | Ortholog search: PDBe RCSB |
| PDB | List of PDB id codes 4JNB, 4KI9 |
Enzyme activity
| EC # | BRENDA | ExPASy | KEGG | MetaCyc |
|---|---|---|---|---|
| 3.1.3.16 | ↗ | ↗ | ↗ | ↗ |
| 3.1.3.48 | ↗ | ↗ | ↗ | ↗ |

Gene location (Human)
| Chr. | Chromosome 1 (human) |
| Band | 1q23.3 | Start | 161,749,758 bp |
| Band | 1q23.3 | End | 161,757,238 bp |

Gene location (Mouse)
| Chr. | Chromosome 1 (mouse) |
| Band | 1|1 H3 | Start | 170,873,498 bp |
| Band | 1|1 H3 | End | 170,885,540 bp |
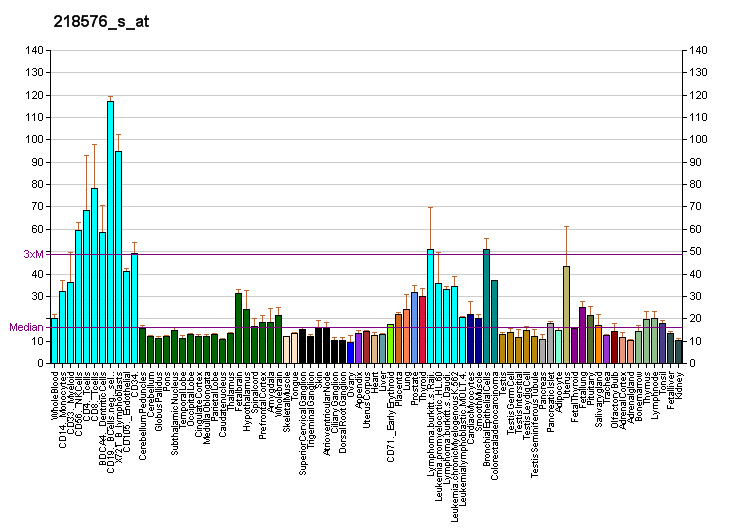
RNA expression pattern
| Bgee | Human / Mouse (ortholog); Top expressed in: oocyte; cerebellar hemisphere; right hemisphere of cerebellum; granulocyte; embryo; cerebellar vermis; ganglionic eminence; body of uterus; left ovary; gonad / Top expressed in: primary oocyte; zygote; embryo; secondary oocyte; embryo; neural layer of retina; morula; morula; neural tube; epiblast; More reference expression data |
| BioGPS | More reference expression data |
Gene ontology
| Molecular function | protein tyrosine phosphatase activity; protein binding; phosphoprotein phosphatase activity; hydrolase activity; protein tyrosine/serine/threonine phosphatase activity; metal ion binding; zinc ion binding; phosphatase activity; nucleic acid binding; kinase binding |
| Cellular component | cytosol; nucleus; cytoplasm |
| Biological process | protein dephosphorylation; positive regulation of glucokinase activity; peptidyl-tyrosine dephosphorylation; dephosphorylation |
Sources:Amigo / QuickGO
Orthologs
| Databases | NCBI: entry; OMA: entry |
| Species | Human | Mouse |
| Entrez | 11266 | 80915 |
| Ensembl | ENSG00000081721 | ENSMUSG00000026659 |
| UniProt | Q9UNI6 | Q9D0T2 |
| RefSeq (mRNA) | NM_007240 | NM_023173 |
| RefSeq (protein) | NP_009171 | NP_075662; NP_001343414; NP_001343415 |
| Location (UCSC) | Chr 1: 161.75 – 161.76 Mb | Chr 1: 170.87 – 170.89 Mb |
| PubMed search |
- Wikidata
| View/Edit Human | View/Edit Mouse |

Dual specificity protein phosphatase 12 is an enzyme that in humans is encoded by the DUSP12 gene.

The protein encoded by this gene is a member of the dual specificity protein phosphatase subfamily. These phosphatases inactivate their target kinases by dephosphorylating both the phosphoserine/threonine and phosphotyrosine residues. They negatively regulate members of the mitogen-activated protein (MAP) kinase superfamily (MAPK/ERK, SAPK/JNK, p38), which is associated with cellular proliferation and differentiation.

Different members of the family of dual specificity phosphatases show distinct substrate specificities for various MAP kinases, different tissue distribution and subcellular localization, and different modes of inducibility of their expression by extracellular stimuli.

This gene product is the human ortholog of the Saccharomyces cerevisiae YVH1 protein tyrosine phosphatase. It is localized predominantly in the nucleus, and is novel in that it contains, and is regulated by a zinc finger domain.
