= (pyruvate dehydrogenase (acetyl-transferring))-phosphatase =

Class of enzymes

[pyruvate dehydrogenase (lipoamide)] phosphatase

Identifiers
- EC no.: 3.1.3.43
- CAS no.: 9073-70-5

Databases
- BRENDA: enzyme data
- ExPASy: NiceZyme view
- KEGG: enzyme entry
- MetaCyc: metabolic pathway
- Rhea: reactions
- PDB structures: RCSB PDB PDBe PDBsum
- Gene Ontology: AmiGO / QuickGO
Search
- PMC: articles
- PubMed: articles
- NCBI: proteins

The enzyme [pyruvate dehydrogenase (acetyl-transferring)]-phosphatase (EC 3.1.3.43) catalyzes the reaction

[pyruvate dehydrogenase (acetyl-transferring)] phosphate + H_{2}O $\rightleftharpoons$ [pyruvate dehydrogenase (acetyl-transferring)] + phosphate

This enzyme belongs to the family of hydrolases, specifically those acting on phosphoric monoester bonds. The systematic name is [pyruvate dehydrogenase (acetyl-transferring)]-phosphate phosphohydrolase. Other names in common use include pyruvate dehydrogenase phosphatase, phosphopyruvate dehydrogenase phosphatase, [pyruvate dehydrogenase (lipoamide)]-phosphatase, and [pyruvate dehydrogenase (lipoamide)]-phosphate phosphohydrolase.

== Structural studies ==
As of late 2007, only one structure has been solved for this class of enzymes, with the PDB accession code PDB: 2PNQ.
