= DUSP13A =

Protein-coding gene in the species Homo sapiens

Identifiers
- Aliases: DUSP13A, dual specificity phosphatase 13A, BEDP, MDSP, DUSP13
- External IDs: GeneCards: DUSP13A
Enzyme activity
EC #	BRENDA	ExPASy	KEGG	MetaCyc
3.1.3.16	↗	↗	↗	↗
3.1.3.48	↗	↗	↗	↗
Gene ontology
Molecular function	protein tyrosine phosphatase activity; phosphoprotein phosphatase activity; hydrolase activity; protein tyrosine/serine/threonine phosphatase activity; phosphatase activity
Cellular component	cytoplasm
Biological process	protein dephosphorylation; peptidyl-tyrosine dephosphorylation; dephosphorylation
Sources:Amigo / QuickGO
Orthologs
Databases	NCBI: entry; OMA: entry
Species	Human	Mouse
Entrez	128854680	n/a
Ensembl	ENSG00000293543	n/a
UniProt	Q6B8I1	n/a
RefSeq (mRNA)	NM_001007271	n/a
RefSeq (protein)	NP_001007272	n/a
Location (UCSC)	n/a	n/a
PubMed search		n/a
- Wikidata
View/Edit Human

Dual specificity protein phosphatase 13A is an enzyme that in humans is encoded by the DUSP13A gene. This gene has previously been considered part of DUSP13, but that term includes the related gene, DUSP13B. This protein has also been called "muscle-restricted dual-specificity phosphatase" (MDSP) to distinguish it from DUSP13B, which has been called "Testis- and skeletal-muscle-specific phosphatase" or "TMDP".

== Function ==
Members of the protein tyrosine phosphatase superfamily cooperate with protein kinases to regulate cell proliferation and differentiation. This gene encodes a dual specificity phosphatase that acts on both phosphotyrosine and phosphoserine/threonine residues. The encoded protein is expressed in skeletal muscle.
