= PPM1K =

Protein-coding gene in the species Homo sapiens

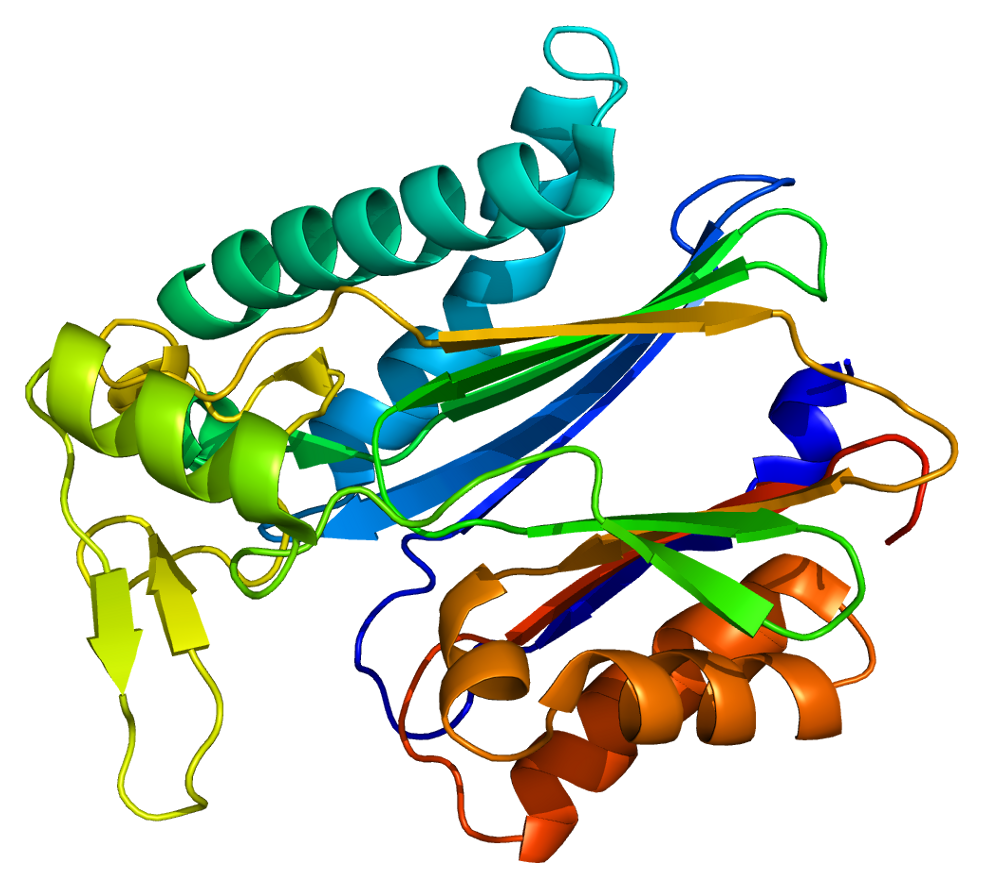

Identifiers
- Aliases: PPM1K, BDP, MSUDMV, PP2Ckappa, PP2Cm, PTMP, UG0882E07, protein phosphatase, Mg2+/Mn2+ dependent 1K
- External IDs: OMIM: 611065; MGI: 2442111; GeneCards: PPM1K
Available structures
PDB	Ortholog search: PDBe RCSB
PDB	List of PDB id codes 2IQ1, 4DA1
Enzyme activity
EC #	BRENDA	ExPASy	KEGG	MetaCyc
3.1.3.16	↗	↗	↗	↗
3.1.3.52	↗	↗	↗	↗

Gene location (Human)
Chr.	Chromosome 4 (human)
Band	4q22.1	Start	88,257,620 bp
Band	4q22.1	End	88,284,769 bp

Gene location (Mouse)
Chr.	Chromosome 6 (mouse)
Band	6|6 B3	Start	57,506,502 bp
Band	6|6 B3	End	57,535,468 bp
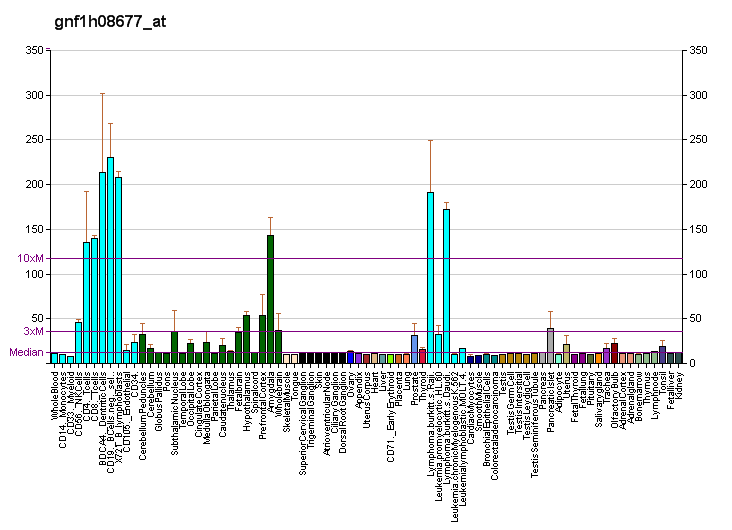
RNA expression pattern
Bgee	Human / Mouse (ortholog); Top expressed in: myocardium of left ventricle; cardiac muscle tissue of right atrium; right ventricle; postcentral gyrus; middle temporal gyrus; internal globus pallidus; superior frontal gyrus; palpebral conjunctiva; pars compacta; pars reticulata / Top expressed in: piriform cortex; interventricular septum; medial geniculate nucleus; left lobe of liver; Region I of hippocampus proper; globus pallidus; myocardium of ventricle; inferior colliculi; lateral geniculate nucleus; parotid gland; More reference expression data
BioGPS	More reference expression data
Gene ontology
Molecular function	protein serine/threonine phosphatase activity; protein binding; catalytic activity; phosphoprotein phosphatase activity; hydrolase activity; metal ion binding; cation binding
Cellular component	mitochondrial matrix; mitochondrion
Biological process	protein dephosphorylation; branched-chain amino acid catabolic process; positive regulation of pyruvate dehydrogenase activity
Sources:Amigo / QuickGO
Orthologs
Databases	NCBI: entry; OMA: entry
Species	Human	Mouse
Entrez	152926	243382
Ensembl	ENSG00000163644	ENSMUSG00000037826
UniProt	Q8N3J5	Q8BXN7
RefSeq (mRNA)	NM_152542	NM_175523
RefSeq (protein)	NP_689755	NP_780732
Location (UCSC)	Chr 4: 88.26 – 88.28 Mb	Chr 6: 57.51 – 57.54 Mb
PubMed search
- Wikidata
View/Edit Human	View/Edit Mouse

Protein phosphatase 1K, mitochondrial is an enzyme that in humans is encoded by the PPM1K gene.
