= DUSP13B =

Protein-coding gene in the species Homo sapiens

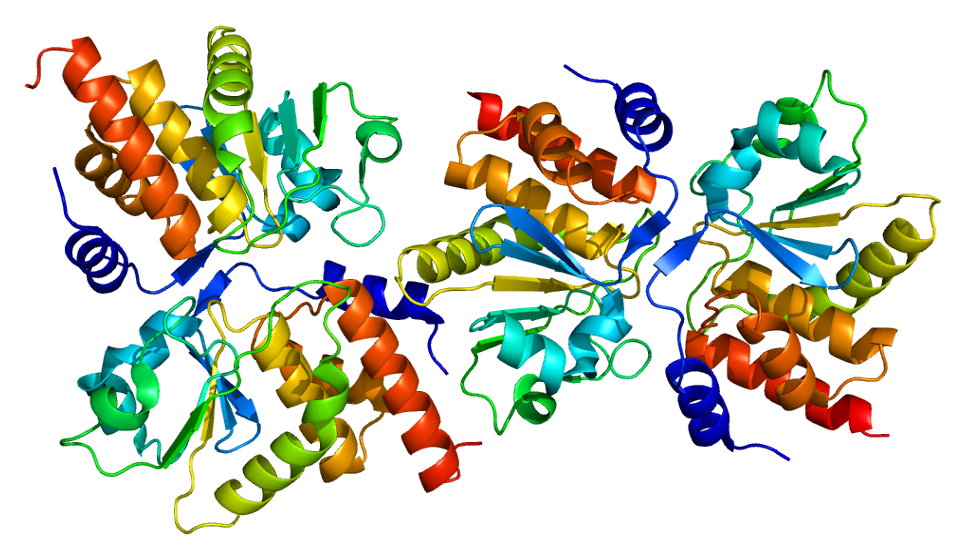

Identifiers
- Aliases: DUSP13B, MDSP, SKRP4, TMDP, dual specificity phosphatase 13, DUSP13, dual specificity phosphatase 13B
- External IDs: OMIM: 613191; MGI: 1351599; GeneCards: DUSP13B
Available structures
PDB	Ortholog search: PDBe RCSB
PDB	List of PDB id codes 2GWO, 2PQ5
Enzyme activity
EC #	BRENDA	ExPASy	KEGG	MetaCyc
3.1.3.16	↗	↗	↗	↗
3.1.3.48	↗	↗	↗	↗

Gene location (Human)
Chr.	Chromosome 10 (human)
Band	10q22.2	Start	75,094,432 bp
Band	10q22.2	End	75,109,221 bp

Gene location (Mouse)
Chr.	Chromosome 14 (mouse)
Band	14|14 A3	Start	21,783,462 bp
Band	14|14 A3	End	21,801,249 bp
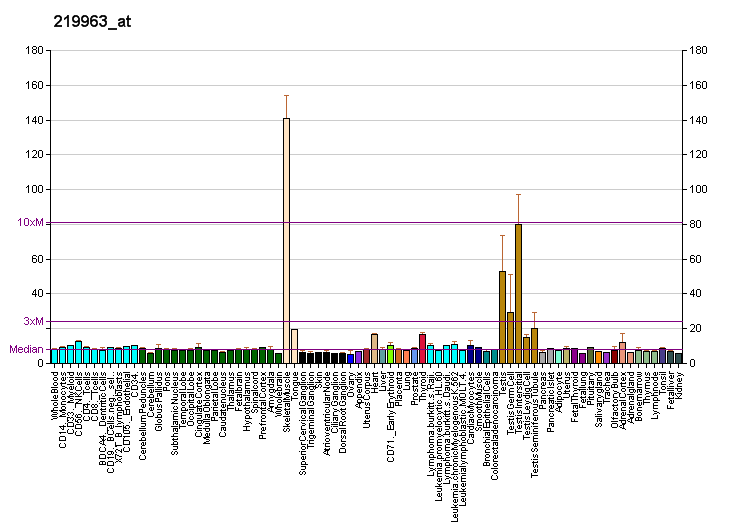
RNA expression pattern
Bgee	Human / Mouse (ortholog); Top expressed in: muscle of thigh; gastrocnemius muscle; triceps brachii muscle; glutes; Skeletal muscle tissue of rectus abdominis; biceps brachii; vastus lateralis muscle; Skeletal muscle tissue of biceps brachii; thoracic diaphragm; deltoid muscle / Top expressed in: spermatid; muscle of thigh; triceps brachii muscle; seminiferous tubule; temporal muscle; skeletal muscle tissue; extraocular muscle; sternocleidomastoid muscle; medial head of gastrocnemius muscle; digastric muscle; More reference expression data
BioGPS	More reference expression data
Orthologs
Databases	NCBI: entry; OMA: entry
Species	Human	Mouse
Entrez	51207	27389
Ensembl	ENSG00000079393	ENSMUSG00000021768
UniProt	Q9UII6	Q6B8I0; Q9QYJ7
RefSeq (mRNA)	NM_001007272; NM_001007273; NM_001007274; NM_001007275; NM_016364 NM_001320842; NM_001320843; NM_001363514	NM_001007268; NM_013849; NM_001374075; NM_001374077; NM_001374078 NM_001374079
RefSeq (protein)	NP_057448.3; NP_001307772.1; NP_001350443	NP_001007269; NP_038877; NP_001361004; NP_001361006; NP_001361007 NP_001361008; NP_038877.2
Location (UCSC)	Chr 10: 75.09 – 75.11 Mb	Chr 14: 21.78 – 21.8 Mb
PubMed search
- Wikidata
View/Edit Human	View/Edit Mouse

Dual specificity protein phosphatase 13B (also called TMDB) is an enzyme that in humans is encoded by the DUSP13B gene. This gene has previously been denoted DUSP13, but that term has also included the related gene, DUSP13A.

== Function ==
Members of the protein tyrosine phosphatase superfamily cooperate with protein kinases to regulate cell proliferation and differentiation. This superfamily is separated into two families based on the substrate that is dephosphorylated. One family, the dual specificity phosphatases (DSPs) acts on both phosphotyrosine and phosphoserine/threonine residues. This gene encodes different but related DSP proteins through the use of non-overlapping open reading frames, alternate splicing, and presumed different transcription promoters. Expression of the distinct proteins from this gene has been found to be tissue specific and the proteins may be involved in postnatal development of specific tissues. A protein encoded by the upstream ORF was found in skeletal muscle, whereas the encoded protein from the downstream ORF was found only in testis. In mouse, a similar pattern of expression was found. Multiple alternatively spliced transcript variants were described, but the full-length sequence of only some were determined.
