= Dual-specificity phosphatase =

Protein family

Dual-specificity phosphatase (DUSP; DSP) is a form of phosphatase that can act upon tyrosine or serine/threonine residues.

There are several families of dual-specificity phosphatase enzymes in mammals. All share a similar catalytic mechanism, by which a conserved cysteine residue forms a covalent intermediate with the phosphate group to be eliminated. The residues surrounding their catalytic core obey a rather strict consensus: His-Cys-x-x-x-x-x-Arg-Ser. The serine side chain and an additional conserved aspartate play a central role in the elimination of the Cys-linked intermediate, thus completing their enzymatic cycle. The main difference between tyrosine-specific phosphatases and dual-specificity phosphatases lies in the width of the latter enzymes' catalytic pocket: thus they can accommodate phosphorylated serine or threonine side chains as well as phosphorylated tyrosines.

== Classification ==
The human genome encodes at least 61 different DUSP proteins. The following major groups or families of DUSPs were identified:

- Slingshot phosphatases:

There are three members of this family (SSH1L, SSH2L and SSH3L) with broad specificity. They contain SH3-binding motifs as well as F-actin binding motifs, thus they are generally believed to play a role in the regulation of cytoskeletal rearrangements. In accordance with their proposed rule, proteins like ADF, cofilin and LIMK1 are slingshot substrates.

- Phosphatases of Regenerating Liver (PRLs):

Three PRL genes were described in mammals (PRL-1, PRL-2 and PRL-3). They share a high sequence identity and possess an N-terminal prenylation sequence (CAAX box). Despite their up-regulation in colorectal cancer, the role and substrate specificity of PRLs is poorly known.

- Cdc14 phosphatases:

The four mammalian Cdc14 proteins (named KAP, Cdc14A, Cdc14B and PTP9Q22) play a crucial role in cell cycle regulation by dephosphorylating cyclin-dependent kinases, most importantly CDK2.

- PTEN and myotubularin phosphatases

There are five PTEN-like phosphatases encoded in the human genome. Though structurally related to other DUSPs, these are not strictly phosphorotein-phosphatases, since their most important substrates are phosphorylated inositol lipids. Myotubularins similarly display a preference towards certain phosphatidyl inositols.

- Mitogen-activated protein Kinase Phosphatases (MKPs)

MKPs form a rather large family, with some 11 well-characterized members. They are responsible for the dephosphorylation of active mitogen-activated protein kinases (MAPKs). In accordance with this role, several (but not all) MKPs contain an additional, N-terminal domain. Although structurally similar to Cdc14, this extra domain is inactive, and plays a role in substrate recruitment. The surface of this substrate-binding domain mimics the D-motifs found in intrinsically disordered substrates of MAPKs.

- In addition, there are several dual-specificity phosphatases lacking close relatives. Most of these atypical DUSPs are poorly characterized. Some of them are probably inactive, and only mediate protein-protein interactions.
