= DUSP18 =

Protein-coding gene in the species Homo sapiens

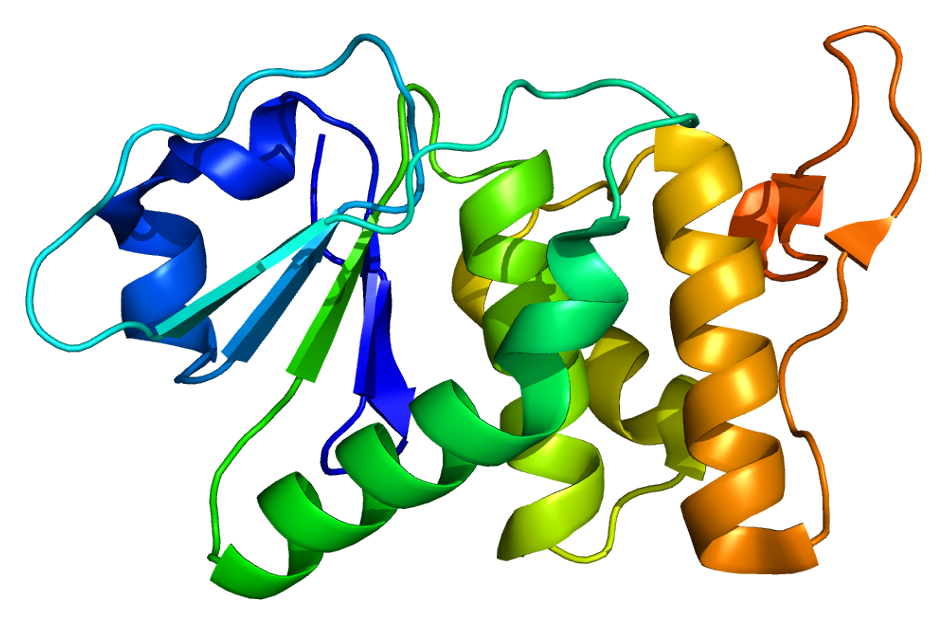

Identifiers
- Aliases: DUSP18, DSP18, DUSP20, LMWDSP20, bK963H5.1, dual specificity phosphatase 18
- External IDs: OMIM: 611446; MGI: 1922469; GeneCards: DUSP18
Available structures
PDB	Ortholog search: PDBe RCSB
PDB	List of PDB id codes 2ESB
Enzyme activity
EC #	BRENDA	ExPASy	KEGG	MetaCyc
3.1.3.16	↗	↗	↗	↗
3.1.3.48	↗	↗	↗	↗

Gene location (Human)
Chr.	Chromosome 22 (human)
Band	22q12.2	Start	30,652,051 bp
Band	22q12.2	End	30,667,887 bp

Gene location (Mouse)
Chr.	Chromosome 11 (mouse)
Band	11|11 A1	Start	3,845,240 bp
Band	11|11 A1	End	3,851,296 bp
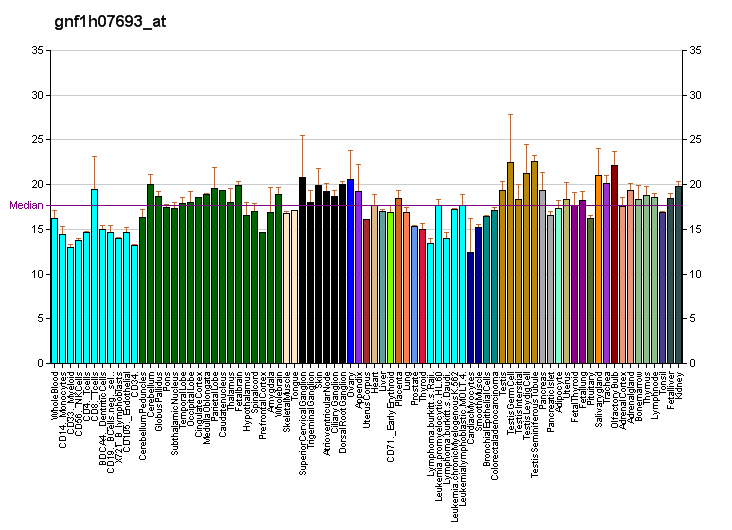
RNA expression pattern
Bgee	Human / Mouse (ortholog); Top expressed in: secondary oocyte; bronchial epithelial cell; mucosa of ileum; left testis; right testis; testicle; mucosa of paranasal sinus; sperm; right uterine tube; blood / Top expressed in: zygote; interventricular septum; secondary oocyte; myocardium of ventricle; Rostral migratory stream; dentate gyrus of hippocampal formation granule cell; lip; islet of Langerhans; soleus muscle; muscle of thigh; More reference expression data
BioGPS	More reference expression data
Gene ontology
Molecular function	protein tyrosine phosphatase activity; MAP kinase tyrosine/serine/threonine phosphatase activity; phosphoprotein phosphatase activity; hydrolase activity; phosphatase activity; protein tyrosine/serine/threonine phosphatase activity
Cellular component	cytoplasm; nucleus; nucleoplasm; mitochondrion; membrane; mitochondrial inner membrane
Biological process	protein dephosphorylation; peptidyl-tyrosine dephosphorylation; peptidyl-threonine dephosphorylation; dephosphorylation
Sources:Amigo / QuickGO
Orthologs
Databases	NCBI: entry; OMA: entry
Species	Human	Mouse
Entrez	150290	75219
Ensembl	ENSG00000167065	ENSMUSG00000047205
UniProt	Q8NEJ0	Q8VE01
RefSeq (mRNA)	NM_001304794; NM_001304795; NM_001304796; NM_152511	NM_173745
RefSeq (protein)	NP_001291723; NP_001291724; NP_001291725; NP_689724	NP_776106
Location (UCSC)	Chr 22: 30.65 – 30.67 Mb	Chr 11: 3.85 – 3.85 Mb
PubMed search
- Wikidata
View/Edit Human	View/Edit Mouse

Dual specificity protein phosphatase 18 is an enzyme that is encoded by the DUSP18 gene in humans.
