= Dual specificity phosphatase 8 =

Protein-coding gene in the species Homo sapiens

DUSP8

Identifiers
- Aliases: DUSP8, C11orf81, HB5, HVH-5, HVH8, dual specificity phosphatase 8
- External IDs: OMIM: 602038; MGI: 106626; GeneCards: DUSP8
Available structures
| PDB | Ortholog search: PDBe RCSB |
| PDB | List of PDB id codes 4JMK |
Enzyme activity
| EC # | BRENDA | ExPASy | KEGG | MetaCyc |
|---|---|---|---|---|
| 3.1.3.16 | ↗ | ↗ | ↗ | ↗ |
| 3.1.3.48 | ↗ | ↗ | ↗ | ↗ |

Gene location (Human)
| Chr. | Chromosome 11 (human) |
| Band | 11p15.5 | Start | 1,554,051 bp |
| Band | 11p15.5 | End | 1,572,271 bp |

Gene location (Mouse)
| Chr. | Chromosome 7 (mouse) |
| Band | 7 F5|7 87.59 cM | Start | 141,633,227 bp |
| Band | 7 F5|7 87.59 cM | End | 141,649,580 bp |
RNA expression pattern
| Bgee | Human / Mouse (ortholog); Top expressed in: gastric mucosa; superior frontal gyrus; primary visual cortex; right hemisphere of cerebellum; right frontal lobe; prefrontal cortex; nucleus accumbens; putamen; anterior cingulate cortex; temporal lobe / Top expressed in: subiculum; Region I of hippocampus proper; superior frontal gyrus; olfactory tubercle; dorsal tegmental nucleus; nucleus accumbens; dentate gyrus of hippocampal formation granule cell; primary visual cortex; cerebellar cortex; Rostral migratory stream; More reference expression data |
| BioGPS | n/a |
Gene ontology
| Molecular function | MAP kinase tyrosine/serine/threonine phosphatase activity; phosphoprotein phosphatase activity; hydrolase activity; protein tyrosine/serine/threonine phosphatase activity; phosphatase activity; protein tyrosine phosphatase activity |
| Cellular component | nucleus; cytoplasm; cytosol |
| Biological process | protein dephosphorylation; dephosphorylation; peptidyl-tyrosine dephosphorylation |
Sources:Amigo / QuickGO
Orthologs
| Databases | NCBI: entry; OMA: entry |
| Species | Human | Mouse |
| Entrez | 1850 | 18218 |
| Ensembl | ENSG00000184545; ENSG00000273793; ENSG00000278165 | ENSMUSG00000037887 |
| UniProt | Q13202 | O09112 |
| RefSeq (mRNA) | NM_004420 | NM_008748 |
| RefSeq (protein) | NP_004411 | NP_032774 |
| Location (UCSC) | Chr 11: 1.55 – 1.57 Mb | Chr 7: 141.63 – 141.65 Mb |
| PubMed search |
- Wikidata
| View/Edit Human | View/Edit Mouse |

Dual specificity phosphatase 8 is a protein that in humans is encoded by the DUSP8 gene.

== Function ==
The protein encoded by this gene is a member of the dual specificity protein phosphatase subfamily. These phosphatases inactivate their target kinases by dephosphorylating both the phosphoserine/threonine and phosphotyrosine residues. They negatively regulate members of the mitogen-activated protein (MAP) kinase superfamily (MAPK/ERK, SAPK/JNK, p38), which is associated with cellular proliferation and differentiation. Different members of the family of dual specificity phosphatases show distinct substrate specificities for various MAP kinases, different tissue distribution and subcellular localization, and different modes of inducibility of their expression by extracellular stimuli. This gene product inactivates SAPK/JNK and p38, is expressed predominantly in the adult brain, heart, and skeletal muscle, is localized in the cytoplasm, and is induced by nerve growth factor and insulin. An intronless pseudogene for DUSP8 is present on chromosome 10q11.2.
