= SSH2 =

Protein-coding gene in the species Homo sapiens

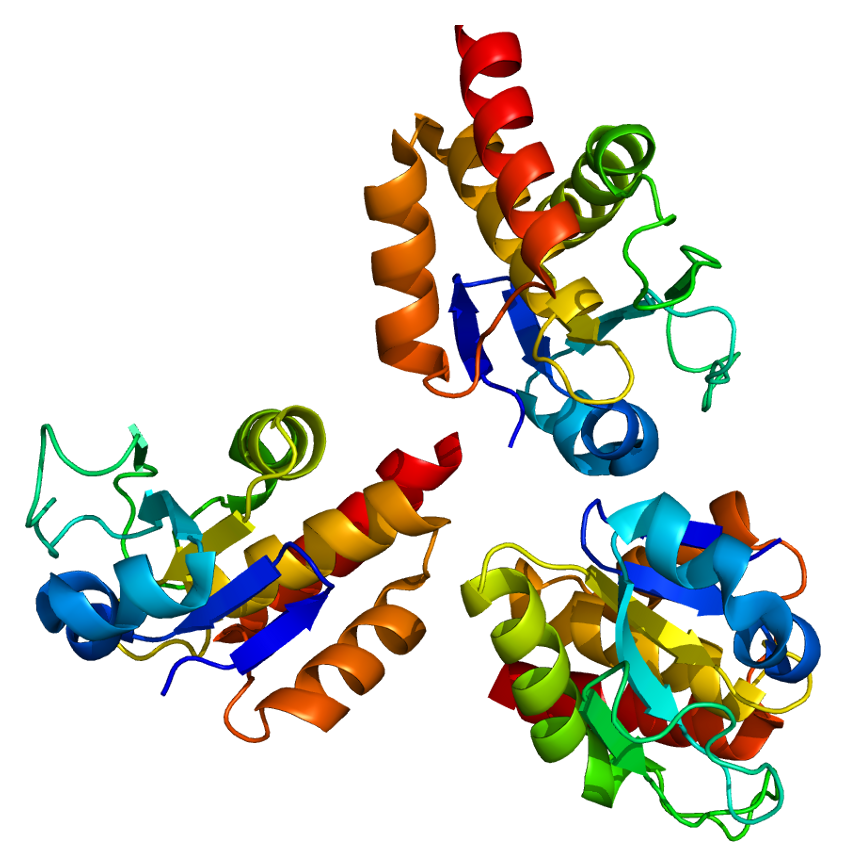

Identifiers
- Aliases: SSH2, SSH-2, SSH-2L, slingshot protein phosphatase 2
- External IDs: OMIM: 606779; MGI: 2679255; GeneCards: SSH2
Available structures
PDB	Ortholog search: PDBe RCSB
PDB	List of PDB id codes 2NT2
Enzyme activity
EC #	BRENDA	ExPASy	KEGG	MetaCyc
3.1.3.16	↗	↗	↗	↗
3.1.3.48	↗	↗	↗	↗

Gene location (Human)
Chr.	Chromosome 17 (human)
Band	17q11.2	Start	29,625,938 bp
Band	17q11.2	End	29,930,276 bp

Gene location (Mouse)
Chr.	Chromosome 11 (mouse)
Band	11|11 B5	Start	77,107,113 bp
Band	11|11 B5	End	77,351,046 bp
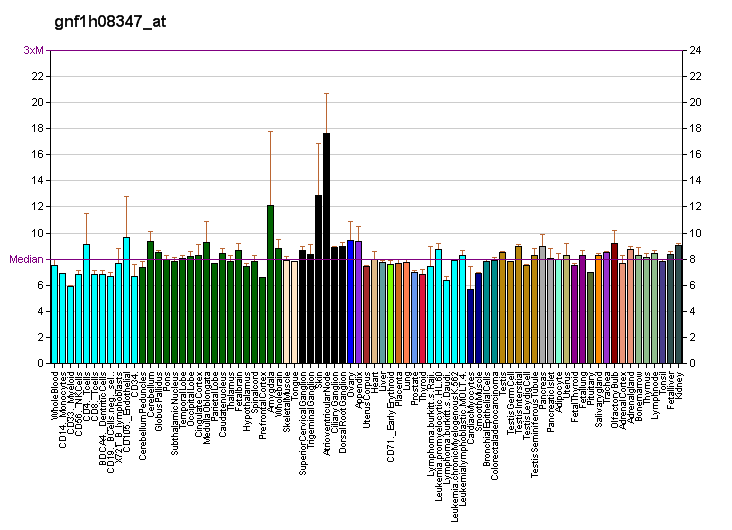
RNA expression pattern
Bgee	Human / Mouse (ortholog); Top expressed in: tibialis anterior muscle; deltoid muscle; cardiac muscle tissue of right atrium; blood; Skeletal muscle tissue of rectus abdominis; gastrocnemius muscle; quadriceps femoris muscle; Skeletal muscle tissue of biceps brachii; vastus lateralis muscle; white blood cell / Top expressed in: spermatocyte; extraocular muscle; digastric muscle; temporal muscle; sternocleidomastoid muscle; interventricular septum; soleus muscle; vastus lateralis muscle; triceps brachii muscle; lymph node; More reference expression data
BioGPS	More reference expression data
Gene ontology
Molecular function	protein tyrosine phosphatase activity; phosphatase activity; actin binding; phosphoprotein phosphatase activity; hydrolase activity; protein tyrosine/serine/threonine phosphatase activity
Cellular component	cytoplasm; cytoskeleton; extracellular space
Biological process	regulation of lamellipodium assembly; regulation of axonogenesis; regulation of actin polymerization or depolymerization; protein dephosphorylation; peptidyl-tyrosine dephosphorylation; actin cytoskeleton organization; dephosphorylation; cell morphogenesis
Sources:Amigo / QuickGO
Orthologs
Databases	NCBI: entry; OMA: entry
Species	Human	Mouse
Entrez	85464	237860
Ensembl	ENSG00000141298	ENSMUSG00000037926
UniProt	Q76I76	Q5SW75
RefSeq (mRNA)	NM_001282129; NM_001282130; NM_001282131; NM_033389	NM_001291190; NM_177710
RefSeq (protein)	NP_001269058; NP_001269059; NP_001269060; NP_203747	NP_001278119; NP_808378
Location (UCSC)	Chr 17: 29.63 – 29.93 Mb	Chr 11: 77.11 – 77.35 Mb
PubMed search
- Wikidata
View/Edit Human	View/Edit Mouse

Protein phosphatase Slingshot homolog 2 is an enzyme that in humans is encoded by the SSH2 gene.

The ADF (actin-depolymerizing factor)/cofilin family (see MIM 601442) is composed of stimulus-responsive mediators of actin dynamics. ADF/cofilin proteins are inactivated by kinases such as LIM domain kinase-1 (LIMK1; MIM 601329). The SSH family appears to play a role in actin dynamics by reactivating ADF/cofilin proteins in vivo (Niwa et al., 2002).[supplied by OMIM]
