= SSH3 =

Protein-coding gene in the species Homo sapiens

Identifiers
- Aliases: SSH3, SSH3L, slingshot protein phosphatase 3
- External IDs: OMIM: 606780; MGI: 2683546; GeneCards: SSH3
Enzyme activity
EC #	BRENDA	ExPASy	KEGG	MetaCyc
3.1.3.16	↗	↗	↗	↗
3.1.3.48	↗	↗	↗	↗

Gene location (Human)
Chr.	Chromosome 11 (human)
Band	11q13.2	Start	67,303,478 bp
Band	11q13.2	End	67,312,607 bp

Gene location (Mouse)
Chr.	Chromosome 19 (mouse)
Band	19|19 A	Start	4,311,696 bp
Band	19|19 A	End	4,319,208 bp
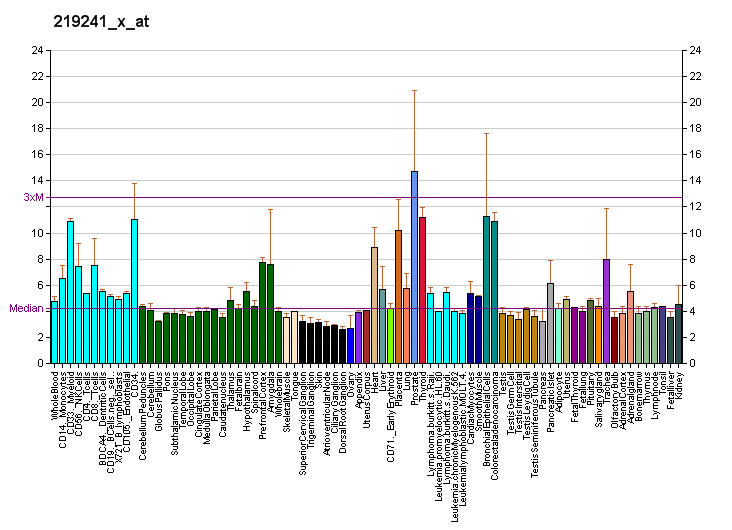

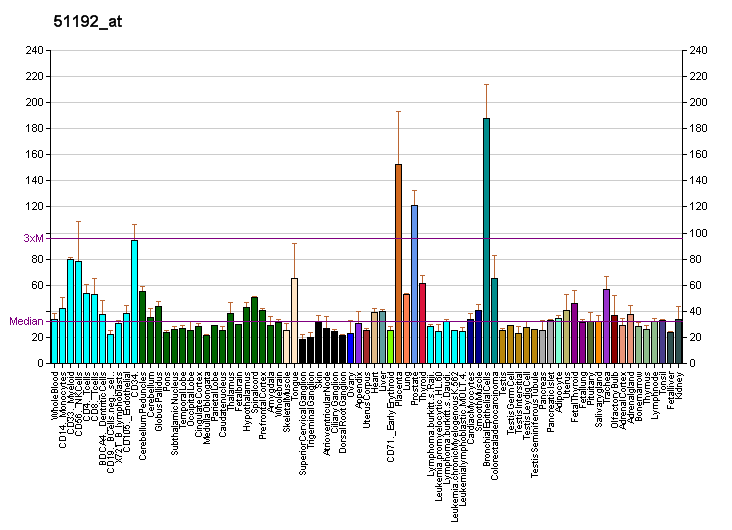

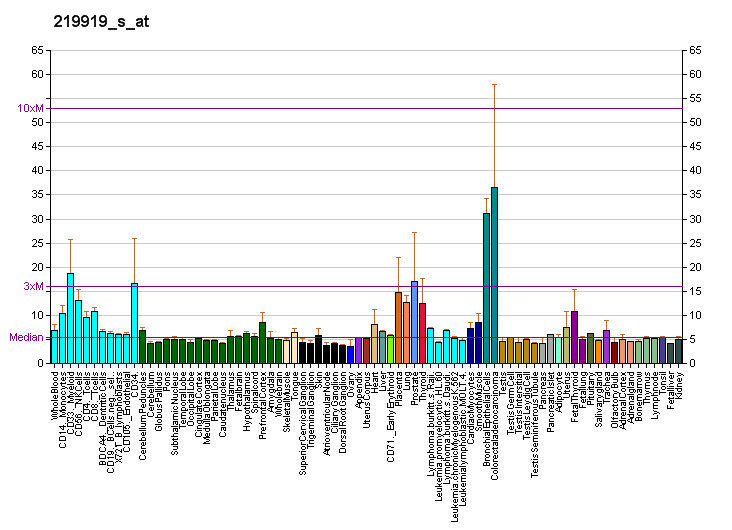
RNA expression pattern
Bgee	Human / Mouse (ortholog); Top expressed in: pancreatic ductal cell; right hemisphere of cerebellum; minor salivary glands; right uterine tube; mucosa of transverse colon; vagina; skin of leg; ectocervix; skin of abdomen; gastric mucosa / Top expressed in: granulocyte; lip; esophagus; primary visual cortex; superior frontal gyrus; cerebellar cortex; stomach; colon; neural layer of retina; duodenum; More reference expression data
BioGPS	More reference expression data
Gene ontology
Molecular function	protein tyrosine phosphatase activity; phosphatase activity; actin binding; phosphoprotein phosphatase activity; hydrolase activity; protein tyrosine/serine/threonine phosphatase activity
Cellular component	cytoplasm; cytoskeleton; nucleus
Biological process	regulation of lamellipodium assembly; regulation of axonogenesis; regulation of actin polymerization or depolymerization; protein dephosphorylation; peptidyl-tyrosine dephosphorylation; dephosphorylation; cell morphogenesis
Sources:Amigo / QuickGO
Orthologs
Databases	NCBI: entry; OMA: entry
Species	Human	Mouse
Entrez	54961	245857
Ensembl	ENSG00000172830	ENSMUSG00000034616
UniProt	Q8TE77	Q8K330
RefSeq (mRNA)	NM_017857; NM_018276	NM_198113; NM_001356620; NM_001374687
RefSeq (protein)	NP_060327	NP_932781; NP_001343549
Location (UCSC)	Chr 11: 67.3 – 67.31 Mb	Chr 19: 4.31 – 4.32 Mb
PubMed search
- Wikidata
View/Edit Human	View/Edit Mouse

Protein phosphatase Slingshot homolog 3 is an enzyme that in humans is encoded by the SSH3 gene.

== Function ==
The ADF (actin-depolymerizing factor)/cofilin family (see MIM 601442) is composed of stimulus-responsive mediators of actin dynamics. ADF/cofilin proteins are inactivated by kinases such as LIM domain kinase-1 (LIMK1; MIM 601329). The SSH family appears to play a role in actin dynamics by reactivating ADF/cofilin proteins in vivo (Niwa et al., 2002).[supplied by OMIM]
