= DUSP2 =

Protein-coding gene in the species Homo sapiens

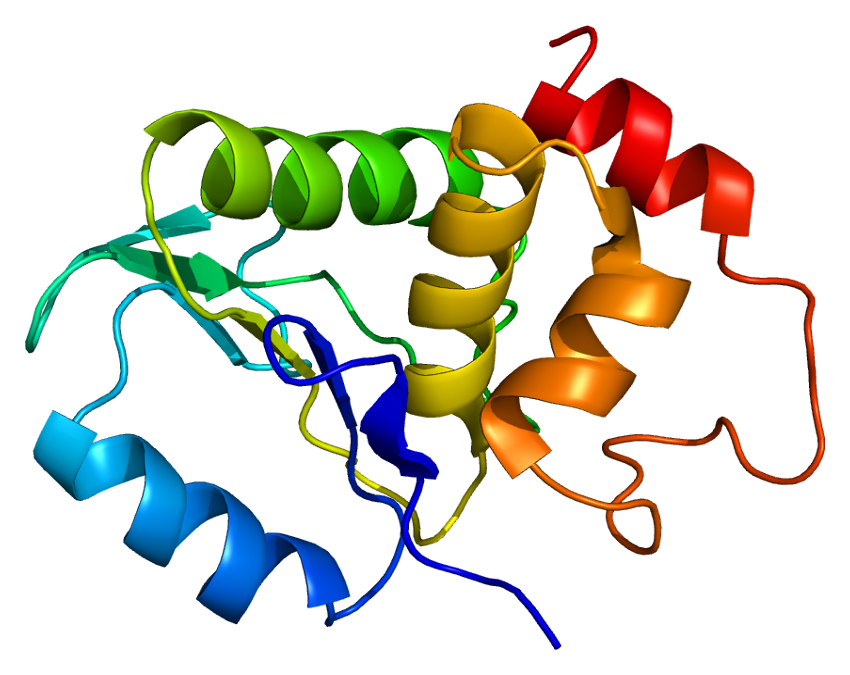

Identifiers
- Aliases: DUSP2, PAC-1, PAC1, dual specificity phosphatase 2
- External IDs: OMIM: 603068; MGI: 101911; GeneCards: DUSP2
Available structures
PDB	Ortholog search: PDBe RCSB
PDB	List of PDB id codes 1M3G
Enzyme activity
EC #	BRENDA	ExPASy	KEGG	MetaCyc
3.1.3.16	↗	↗	↗	↗
3.1.3.48	↗	↗	↗	↗

Gene location (Human)
Chr.	Chromosome 2 (human)
Band	2q11.2	Start	96,143,169 bp
Band	2q11.2	End	96,145,440 bp

Gene location (Mouse)
Chr.	Chromosome 2 (mouse)
Band	2|2 F1	Start	127,178,079 bp
Band	2|2 F1	End	127,180,296 bp
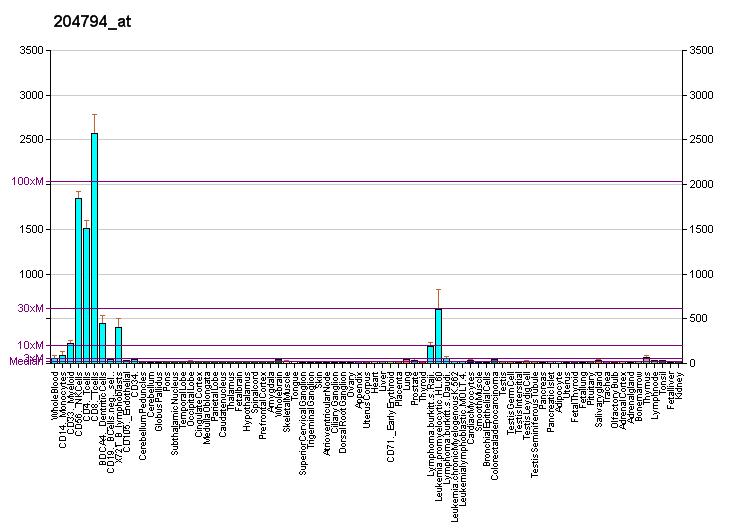
RNA expression pattern
Bgee	Human / Mouse (ortholog); Top expressed in: seminal vesicula; granulocyte; lymph node; mucosa of urinary bladder; monocyte; spleen; testicle; gallbladder; bone marrow cell; appendix / Top expressed in: mesenteric lymph nodes; thymus; spleen; trachea; blood; granulocyte; embryo; lip; tibiofemoral joint; bone marrow; More reference expression data
BioGPS	More reference expression data
Gene ontology
Molecular function	protein tyrosine phosphatase activity; phosphatase activity; MAP kinase tyrosine/serine/threonine phosphatase activity; protein tyrosine/threonine phosphatase activity; protein binding; phosphoprotein phosphatase activity; hydrolase activity; protein tyrosine/serine/threonine phosphatase activity; mitogen-activated protein kinase binding
Cellular component	nucleus; nuclear membrane; cytoplasm
Biological process	protein dephosphorylation; endoderm formation; dephosphorylation; peptidyl-tyrosine dephosphorylation
Sources:Amigo / QuickGO
Orthologs
Databases	NCBI: entry; OMA: entry
Species	Human	Mouse
Entrez	1844	13537
Ensembl	ENSG00000158050	ENSMUSG00000027368
UniProt	Q05923	Q05922
RefSeq (mRNA)	NM_004418	NM_010090
RefSeq (protein)	NP_004409	NP_034220
Location (UCSC)	Chr 2: 96.14 – 96.15 Mb	Chr 2: 127.18 – 127.18 Mb
PubMed search
- Wikidata
View/Edit Human	View/Edit Mouse

Dual specificity protein phosphatase 2 is an enzyme that in humans is encoded by the DUSP2 gene.

The protein encoded by this gene is a member of the dual specificity protein phosphatase subfamily. These phosphatases inactivate their target kinases by dephosphorylating both the phosphoserine/threonine and phosphotyrosine residues. They negatively regulate members of the mitogen-activated protein (MAP) kinase superfamily (MAPK/ERK, SAPK/JNK, p38), which are associated with cellular proliferation and differentiation.

Different members of the family of dual specificity phosphatases show distinct substrate specificities for various MAP kinases, different tissue distribution and subcellular localization, and different modes of inducibility of their expression by extracellular stimuli. This gene product inactivates ERK1 and ERK2, is predominantly expressed in hematopoietic tissues, and is localized in the nucleus.
