= DUSP5 =

Protein-coding gene in the species Homo sapiens

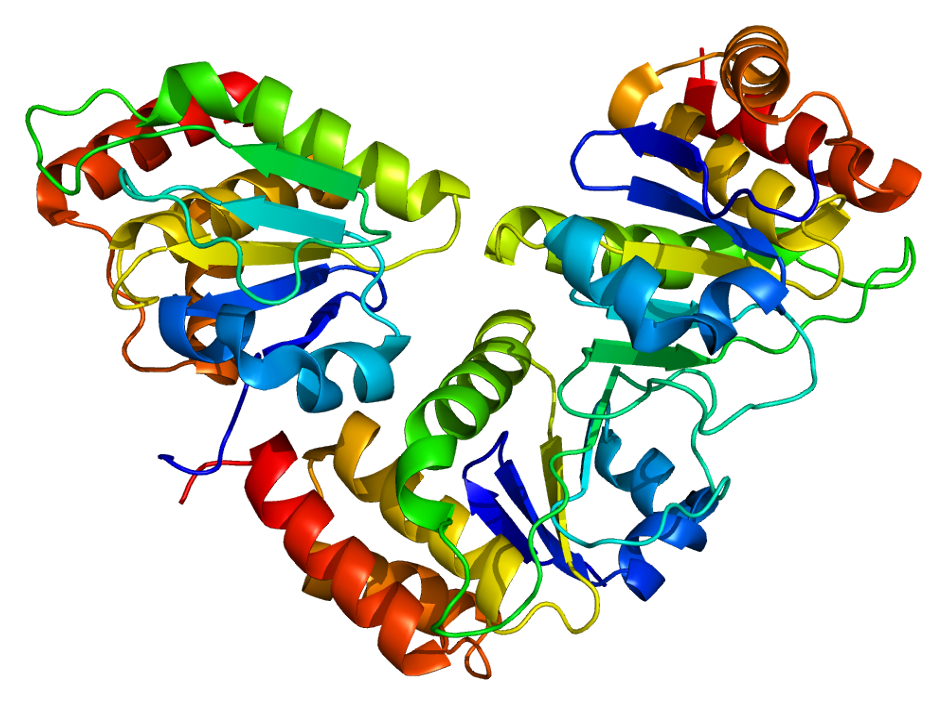

Identifiers
- Aliases: DUSP5, DUSP, HVH3, dual specificity phosphatase 5
- External IDs: OMIM: 603069; MGI: 2685183; GeneCards: DUSP5
Available structures
PDB	Ortholog search: PDBe RCSB
PDB	List of PDB id codes 2G6Z
Enzyme activity
EC #	BRENDA	ExPASy	KEGG	MetaCyc
3.1.3.16	↗	↗	↗	↗
3.1.3.48	↗	↗	↗	↗

Gene location (Human)
Chr.	Chromosome 10 (human)
Band	10q25.2	Start	110,497,907 bp
Band	10q25.2	End	110,511,533 bp

Gene location (Mouse)
Chr.	Chromosome 19 (mouse)
Band	19|19 D2	Start	53,517,540 bp
Band	19|19 D2	End	53,530,862 bp
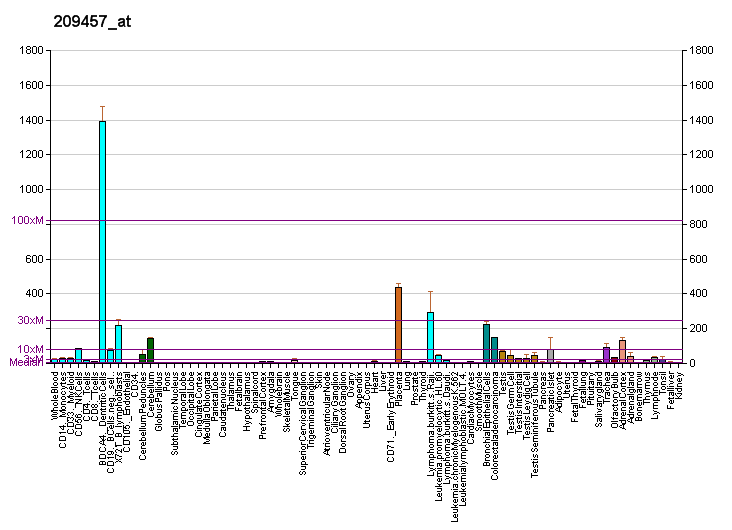
RNA expression pattern
Bgee	Human / Mouse (ortholog); Top expressed in: mucosa of urinary bladder; mucosa of pharynx; gallbladder; testicle; epithelium of esophagus; islet of Langerhans; secondary oocyte; cartilage tissue; vena cava; palpebral conjunctiva / Top expressed in: lumbar spinal ganglion; lobe of cerebellum; cerebellar vermis; parotid gland; granulocyte; mesenteric lymph nodes; decidua; lacrimal gland; islet of Langerhans; thymus; More reference expression data
BioGPS	More reference expression data
Gene ontology
Molecular function	phosphoprotein phosphatase activity; protein binding; protein tyrosine phosphatase activity; MAP kinase tyrosine/serine/threonine phosphatase activity; hydrolase activity; phosphatase activity; protein tyrosine/serine/threonine phosphatase activity
Cellular component	nucleoplasm; nucleus; cytoplasm
Biological process	protein dephosphorylation; MAPK cascade; endoderm formation; peptidyl-tyrosine dephosphorylation; dephosphorylation; peptidyl-threonine dephosphorylation
Sources:Amigo / QuickGO
Orthologs
Databases	NCBI: entry; OMA: entry
Species	Human	Mouse
Entrez	1847	240672
Ensembl	ENSG00000138166	ENSMUSG00000034765
UniProt	Q16690	Q1HL35
RefSeq (mRNA)	NM_004419	NM_001085390
RefSeq (protein)	NP_004410	NP_001078859
Location (UCSC)	Chr 10: 110.5 – 110.51 Mb	Chr 19: 53.52 – 53.53 Mb
PubMed search
- Wikidata
View/Edit Human	View/Edit Mouse

Dual specificity protein phosphatase 5 is an enzyme that in humans is encoded by the DUSP5 gene.

== Function ==
The protein encoded by this gene is a member of the dual specificity protein phosphatase subfamily. These phosphatases inactivate their target kinases by dephosphorylating both the phosphoserine/threonine and phosphotyrosine residues. They negatively regulate members of the mitogen-activated protein (MAP) kinase superfamily (MAPK/ERK, SAPK/JNK, p38), which are associated with cellular proliferation and differentiation. Different members of the family of dual specificity phosphatases show distinct substrate specificities for various MAP kinases, different tissue distribution and subcellular localization, and different modes of inducibility of their expression by extracellular stimuli. This gene product inactivates ERK1/2, is expressed in a variety of tissues with the highest levels in pancreas and brain, and is localized in the nucleus.
