= DUSP4 =

Protein-coding gene in the species Homo sapiens

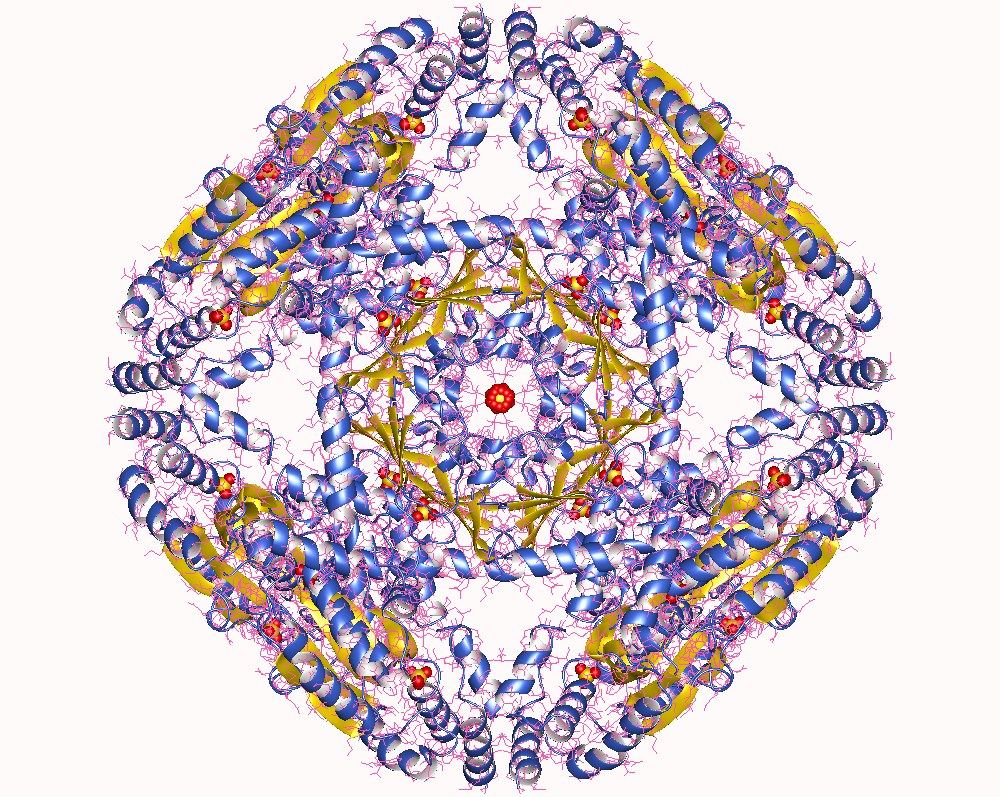
- MKP 2, homo24mer, Human

Identifiers
- Aliases: DUSP4, HVH2, MKP-2, MKP2, TYP, dual specificity phosphatase 4
- External IDs: OMIM: 602747; MGI: 2442191; GeneCards: DUSP4
Available structures
PDB	Ortholog search: PDBe RCSB
PDB	List of PDB id codes 3EZZ
Enzyme activity
EC #	BRENDA	ExPASy	KEGG	MetaCyc
3.1.3.16	↗	↗	↗	↗
3.1.3.48	↗	↗	↗	↗

Gene location (Human)
Chr.	Chromosome 8 (human)
Band	8p12	Start	29,333,064 bp
Band	8p12	End	29,350,684 bp

Gene location (Mouse)
Chr.	Chromosome 8 (mouse)
Band	8|8 A4	Start	35,274,451 bp
Band	8|8 A4	End	35,287,048 bp
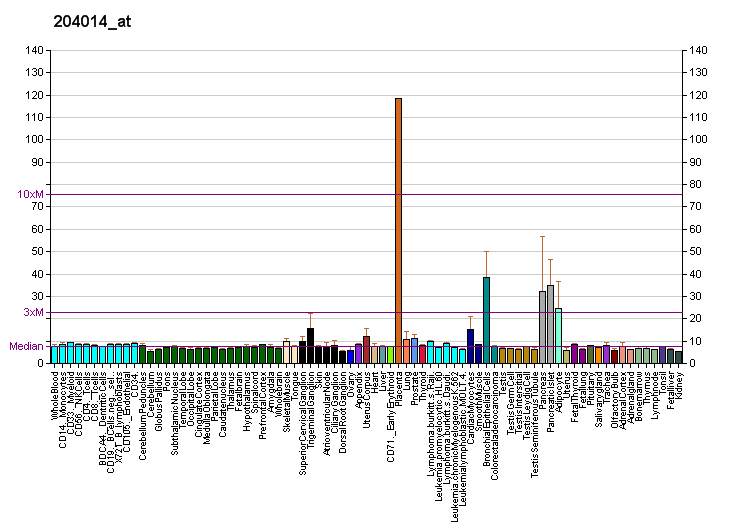

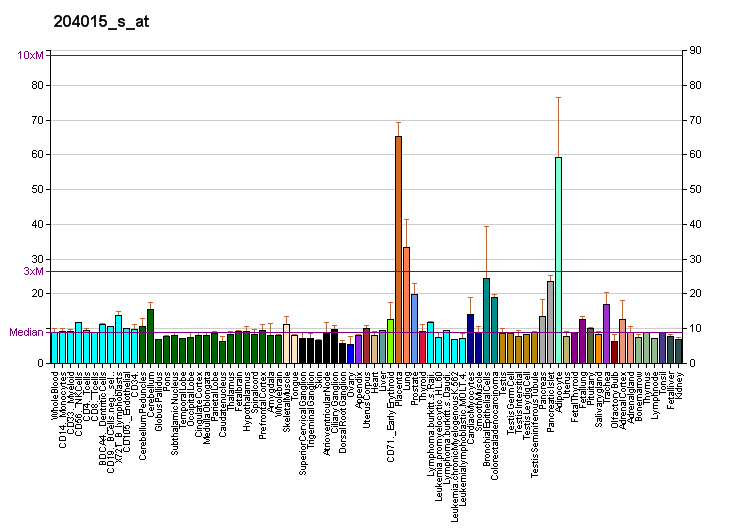
RNA expression pattern
Bgee	Human / Mouse (ortholog); Top expressed in: retinal pigment epithelium; buccal mucosa cell; lactiferous duct; seminal vesicula; palpebral conjunctiva; sperm; trachea; mucosa of urinary bladder; nipple; body of pancreas / Top expressed in: ganglionic eminence; tail of embryo; neural tube; white adipose tissue; mesencephalon; epiblast; neural layer of retina; spermatid; spinal cord; yolk sac; More reference expression data
BioGPS	More reference expression data
Gene ontology
Molecular function	phosphoprotein phosphatase activity; MAP kinase tyrosine/serine/threonine phosphatase activity; hydrolase activity; protein tyrosine/serine/threonine phosphatase activity; protein tyrosine/threonine phosphatase activity; phosphatase activity; protein tyrosine phosphatase activity; MAP kinase serine/threonine phosphatase activity; protein binding
Cellular component	nucleoplasm; nucleus; cytoplasm
Biological process	endoderm formation; protein dephosphorylation; peptidyl-threonine dephosphorylation; dephosphorylation; peptidyl-tyrosine dephosphorylation; negative regulation of ERK1 and ERK2 cascade
Sources:Amigo / QuickGO
Orthologs
Databases	NCBI: entry; OMA: entry
Species	Human	Mouse
Entrez	1846	319520
Ensembl	ENSG00000120875	ENSMUSG00000031530
UniProt	Q13115	Q8BFV3
RefSeq (mRNA)	NM_001394; NM_057158	NM_176933
RefSeq (protein)	NP_001385; NP_476499	NP_795907
Location (UCSC)	Chr 8: 29.33 – 29.35 Mb	Chr 8: 35.27 – 35.29 Mb
PubMed search
- Wikidata
View/Edit Human	View/Edit Mouse

Dual specificity protein phosphatase 4 is an enzyme that in humans is encoded by the DUSP4 gene.

== Function ==
The protein encoded by this gene is a member of the dual specificity protein phosphatase subfamily. These phosphatases inactivate their target kinases by dephosphorylating both the phosphoserine/threonine and phosphotyrosine residues. They negatively regulate members of the mitogen-activated protein (MAP) kinase superfamily (MAPK/ERK, SAPK/JNK, p38), which are associated with cellular proliferation and differentiation. Different members of the family of dual specificity phosphatases show distinct substrate specificities for various MAP kinases, different tissue distribution and subcellular localization, and different modes of inducibility of their expression by extracellular stimuli. This gene product inactivates ERK1, ERK2 and JNK, is expressed in a variety of tissues, and is localized in the nucleus. Two alternatively spliced transcript variants, encoding distinct isoforms, have been observed for this gene. In addition, multiple polyadenylation sites have been reported.

In melanocytic cells DUSP4 gene expression may be regulated by MITF.
