= DUSP7 =

Protein-coding gene in the species Homo sapiens

Identifiers
- Aliases: DUSP7, MKPX, PYST2, dual specificity phosphatase 7
- External IDs: OMIM: 602749; MGI: 2387100; GeneCards: DUSP7
Available structures
| PDB | Ortholog search: PDBe RCSB |
| PDB | List of PDB id codes 4Y2E |
Enzyme activity
| EC # | BRENDA | ExPASy | KEGG | MetaCyc |
|---|---|---|---|---|
| 3.1.3.16 | ↗ | ↗ | ↗ | ↗ |
| 3.1.3.48 | ↗ | ↗ | ↗ | ↗ |

Gene location (Human)
| Chr. | Chromosome 3 (human) |
| Band | 3p21.2 | Start | 52,048,919 bp |
| Band | 3p21.2 | End | 52,056,571 bp |

Gene location (Mouse)
| Chr. | Chromosome 9 (mouse) |
| Band | 9|9 F1 | Start | 106,245,831 bp |
| Band | 9|9 F1 | End | 106,252,923 bp |
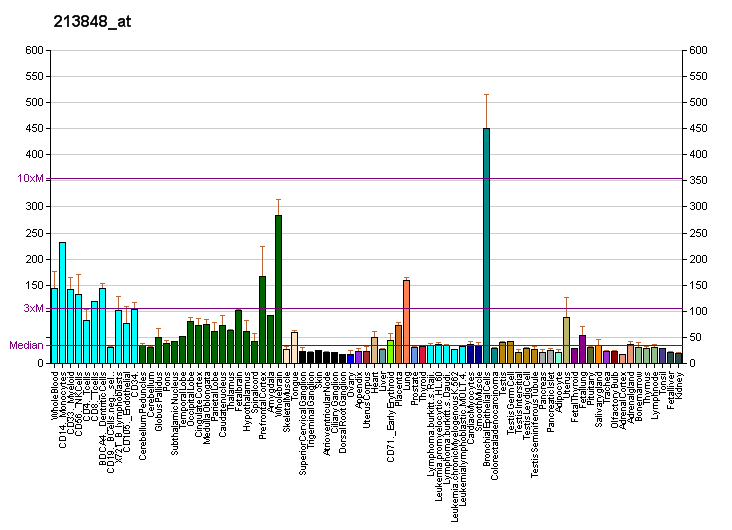

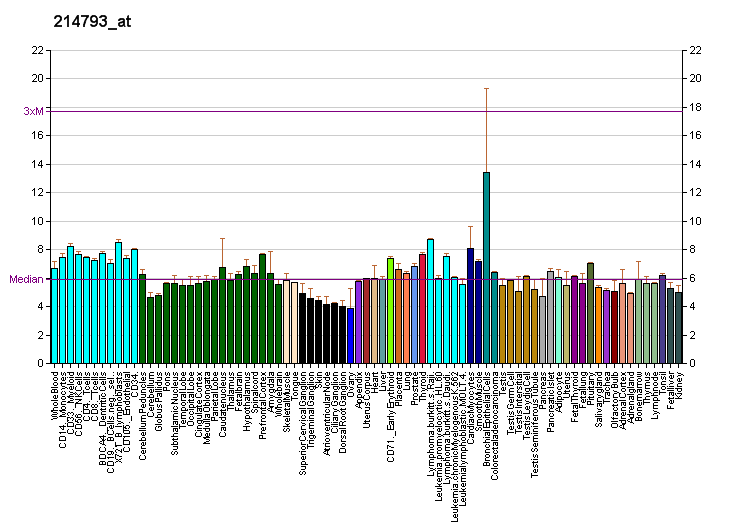
RNA expression pattern
| Bgee | Human / Mouse (ortholog); Top expressed in: oocyte; gingival epithelium; human penis; nipple; skin of thigh; mucosa of pharynx; vulva; secondary oocyte; cervix epithelium; skin of abdomen / Top expressed in: zygote; secondary oocyte; genital tubercle; primary oocyte; tail of embryo; lip; lacrimal gland; neural layer of retina; visual cortex; primary visual cortex; More reference expression data |
| BioGPS | More reference expression data |
Gene ontology
| Molecular function | phosphoprotein phosphatase activity; phosphatase activity; protein binding; MAP kinase tyrosine/serine/threonine phosphatase activity; hydrolase activity; protein tyrosine phosphatase activity; protein tyrosine/serine/threonine phosphatase activity |
| Cellular component | cytoplasm; cytosol; nucleoplasm |
| Biological process | protein dephosphorylation; MAPK cascade; negative regulation of MAP kinase activity; peptidyl-tyrosine dephosphorylation; dephosphorylation |
Sources:Amigo / QuickGO
Orthologs
| Databases | NCBI: entry; OMA: entry |
| Species | Human | Mouse |
| Entrez | 1849 | 235584 |
| Ensembl | ENSG00000164086 | ENSMUSG00000053716 |
| UniProt | Q16829 | Q91Z46 |
| RefSeq (mRNA) | NM_001947 | NM_153459 |
| RefSeq (protein) | NP_001938 | NP_703189 |
| Location (UCSC) | Chr 3: 52.05 – 52.06 Mb | Chr 9: 106.25 – 106.25 Mb |
| PubMed search |
- Wikidata
| View/Edit Human | View/Edit Mouse |

Dual specificity protein phosphatase 7 is an enzyme that in humans is encoded by the DUSP7 gene.

== Function ==
Dual-specificity phosphatases (DUSPs) constitute a large heterogeneous subgroup of the type I cysteine-based protein-tyrosine phosphatase superfamily. DUSPs are characterized by their ability to de-phosphorylate both tyrosine (EC 3.1.3.48) and serine / threonine (EC 3.1.3.16) residues. DUSP7 belongs to a class of DUSPs, designated MKPs, that dephosphorylate MAPK (mitogen-activated protein kinase) proteins ERK, JNK, and p38 with specificity distinct from that of individual MKP proteins. MKPs contain a highly conserved C-terminal catalytic domain and an N-terminal Cdc25-like (CH2) domain. MAPK activation cascades mediate various physiologic processes, including cellular proliferation, apoptosis, differentiation, and stress responses.

It is known to bind and dephosphorylate ErkII, and as it, along with the other members of the DUSP family expresses high selectively for MAP kinases, it has been suggested that it functions as a method for selectively activating/deactivating different members of that family.
