= DUSP10 =

Protein-coding gene in humans

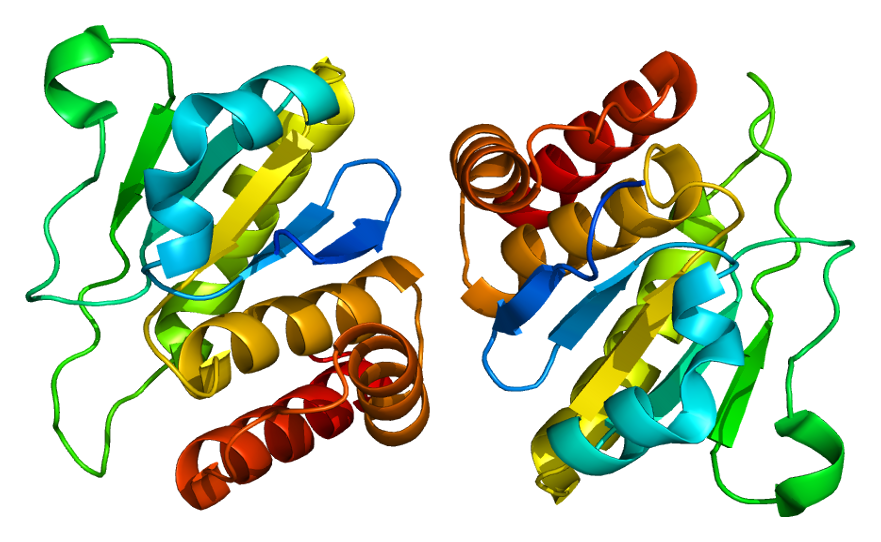

Identifiers
- Aliases: DUSP10, MKP-5, MKP5, dual specificity phosphatase 10
- External IDs: OMIM: 608867; MGI: 1927070; GeneCards: DUSP10
Available structures
PDB	Ortholog search: PDBe RCSB
PDB	List of PDB id codes 1ZZW, 2OUC, 2OUD, 3TG1
Enzyme activity
EC #	BRENDA	ExPASy	KEGG	MetaCyc
3.1.3.16	↗	↗	↗	↗
3.1.3.48	↗	↗	↗	↗

Gene location (Mouse)
Chr.	Chromosome 1 (mouse)
Band	1|1 H5	Start	183,745,499 bp
Band	1|1 H5	End	183,807,833 bp
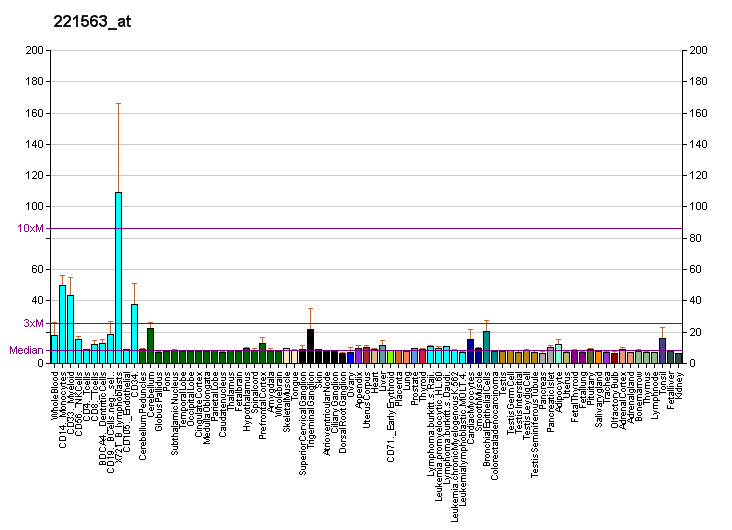

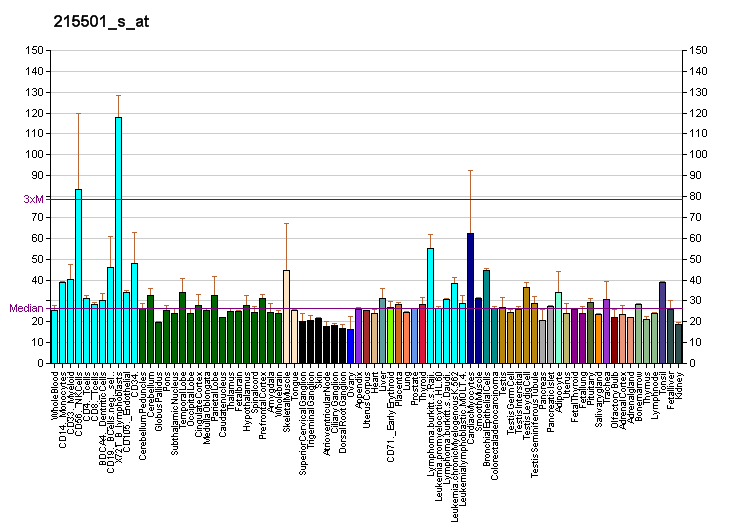
RNA expression pattern
Bgee	Human / Mouse (ortholog); Top expressed in: secondary oocyte; stromal cell of endometrium; right lobe of liver; triceps brachii muscle; vastus lateralis muscle; retinal pigment epithelium; body of pancreas; deltoid muscle; monocyte; amniotic fluid / Top expressed in: temporal muscle; triceps brachii muscle; sternocleidomastoid muscle; zygote; medial head of gastrocnemius muscle; skeletal muscle tissue; thymus; masseter muscle; digastric muscle; soleus muscle; More reference expression data
BioGPS	More reference expression data
Gene ontology
Molecular function	phosphatase activity; protein tyrosine phosphatase activity; MAP kinase tyrosine/serine/threonine phosphatase activity; hydrolase activity; protein tyrosine/serine/threonine phosphatase activity; JUN kinase binding; MAP kinase phosphatase activity; mitogen-activated protein kinase p38 binding; phosphoprotein phosphatase activity; protein tyrosine/threonine phosphatase activity; protein binding
Cellular component	Golgi apparatus; nucleoplasm; cytosol; nuclear speck; nucleus; cytoplasm
Biological process	regulation of innate immune response; regulation of adaptive immune response; oligodendrocyte differentiation; negative regulation of respiratory burst involved in inflammatory response; response to organic substance; response to lipopolysaccharide; negative regulation of oligodendrocyte differentiation; negative regulation of protein kinase activity by regulation of protein phosphorylation; negative regulation of stress-activated MAPK cascade; regulation of brown fat cell differentiation; dephosphorylation; positive regulation of regulatory T cell differentiation; protein dephosphorylation; negative regulation of epithelial cell migration; negative regulation of cell migration; peptidyl-threonine dephosphorylation; negative regulation of JUN kinase activity; negative regulation of JNK cascade; negative regulation of epithelial cell proliferation; negative regulation of ERK1 and ERK2 cascade; negative regulation of p38MAPK cascade; negative regulation of epithelium regeneration; peptidyl-tyrosine dephosphorylation involved in inactivation of protein kinase activity
Sources:Amigo / QuickGO
Orthologs
Databases	NCBI: entry
Species	Human	Mouse
Entrez	11221	63953
Ensembl	n/a	ENSMUSG00000039384
UniProt	Q9Y6W6	Q9ESS0
RefSeq (mRNA)	NM_007207; NM_144728; NM_144729	NM_022019
RefSeq (protein)	NP_009138	NP_071302
Location (UCSC)	n/a	Chr 1: 183.75 – 183.81 Mb
PubMed search
- Wikidata
View/Edit Human	View/Edit Mouse

Dual specificity protein phosphatase 10 is an enzyme that in humans is encoded by the DUSP10 gene.

Dual specificity protein phosphatases inactivate their target kinases by dephosphorylating both the phosphoserine/threonine and phosphotyrosine residues. They negatively regulate members of the MAPK superfamily (MAPK/ERK, SAPK/JNK, p38), which is associated with cellular proliferation and differentiation. Different members of this family of dual specificity phosphatases show distinct substrate specificities for MAPKs, different tissue distribution and subcellular localization, and different modes of inducibility of their expression by extracellular stimuli. This gene product binds to and inactivates p38 and SAPK/JNK, but not MAPK/ERK. Its subcellular localization is unique; it is evenly distributed in both the cytoplasm and the nucleus. This gene is widely expressed in various tissues and organs, and its expression is elevated by stress stimuli. Three transcript variants encoding two different isoforms have been found for this gene.

== Interactions ==
DUSP10 has been shown to interact with MAPK14 and MAPK8.
