= DUSP6 =

Protein-coding gene in humans

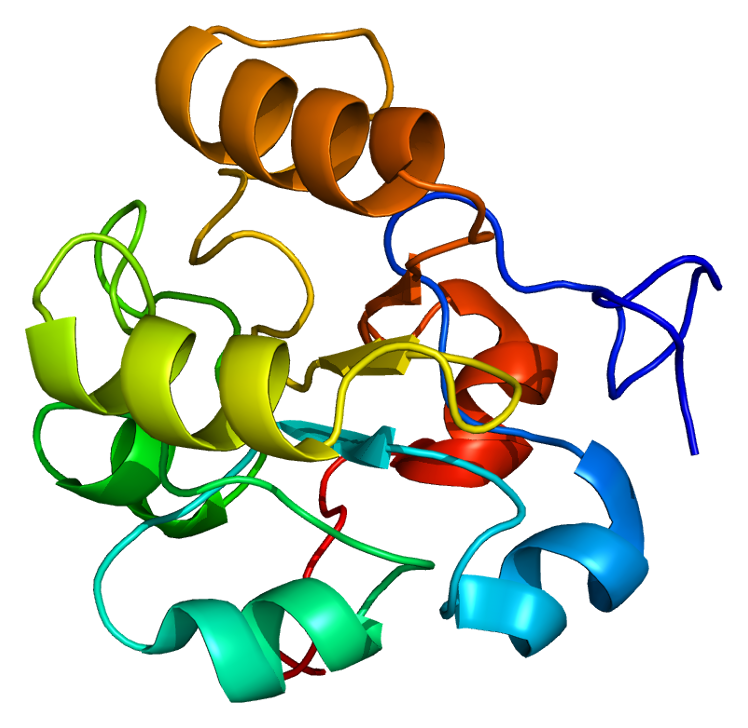

Identifiers
- Aliases: DUSP6, HH19, MKP3, PYST1, dual specificity phosphatase 6
- External IDs: OMIM: 602748; MGI: 1914853; GeneCards: DUSP6
Available structures
PDB	Ortholog search: PDBe RCSB
PDB	List of PDB id codes 1HZM, 1MKP
Enzyme activity
EC #	BRENDA	ExPASy	KEGG	MetaCyc
3.1.3.16	↗	↗	↗	↗
3.1.3.48	↗	↗	↗	↗

Gene location (Human)
Chr.	Chromosome 12 (human)
Band	12q21.33	Start	89,347,235 bp
Band	12q21.33	End	89,352,501 bp

Gene location (Mouse)
Chr.	Chromosome 10 (mouse)
Band	10|10 D1	Start	99,099,093 bp
Band	10|10 D1	End	99,103,351 bp
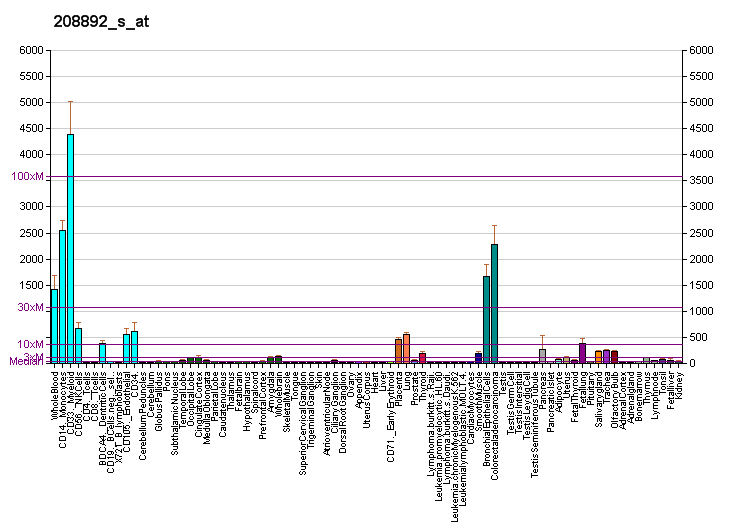

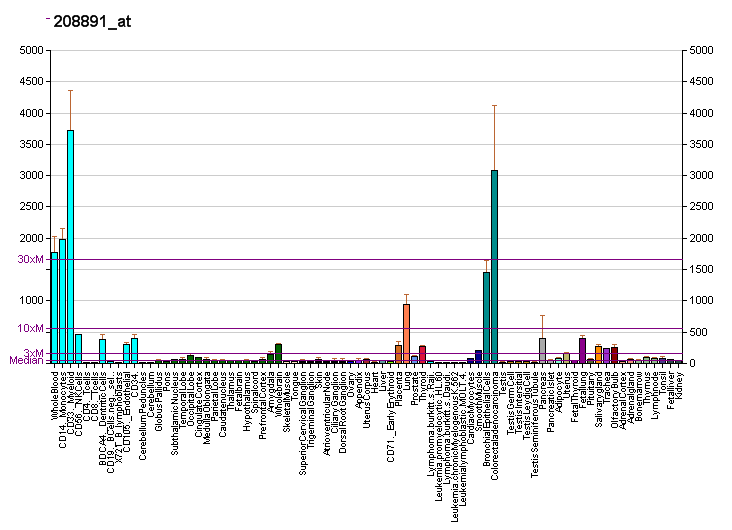

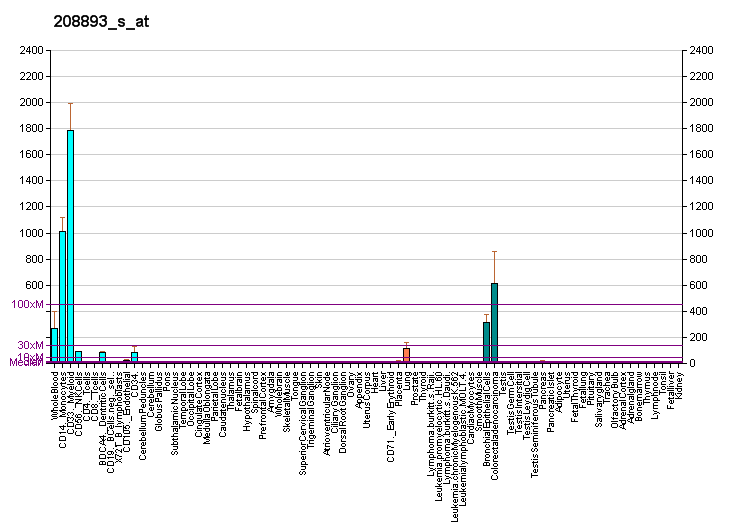
RNA expression pattern
Bgee	Human / Mouse (ortholog); Top expressed in: parotid gland; pericardium; monocyte; lactiferous duct; visceral pleura; lower lobe of lung; retinal pigment epithelium; granulocyte; parietal pleura; trachea / Top expressed in: granulocyte; left lung lobe; stroma of bone marrow; maxillary prominence; retinal pigment epithelium; parotid gland; endocardial cushion; tail of embryo; atrioventricular valve; right lung lobe; More reference expression data
BioGPS	More reference expression data
Gene ontology
Molecular function	phosphoprotein phosphatase activity; phosphatase activity; hydrolase activity; MAP kinase tyrosine/serine/threonine phosphatase activity; protein tyrosine phosphatase activity; protein tyrosine/serine/threonine phosphatase activity
Cellular component	nucleoplasm; cytosol; cytoplasm
Biological process	negative regulation of protein phosphorylation; cell differentiation; positive regulation of cell death; response to organic cyclic compound; regulation of fibroblast growth factor receptor signaling pathway; protein dephosphorylation; response to organic substance; MAPK cascade; response to nitrosative stress; positive regulation of apoptotic process; negative regulation of ERK1 and ERK2 cascade; peptidyl-tyrosine dephosphorylation; response to growth factor; dorsal/ventral pattern formation; regulation of endodermal cell fate specification; dephosphorylation; regulation of heart growth
Sources:Amigo / QuickGO
Orthologs
Databases	NCBI: entry; OMA: entry
Species	Human	Mouse
Entrez	1848	67603
Ensembl	ENSG00000139318	ENSMUSG00000019960
UniProt	Q16828	Q9DBB1
RefSeq (mRNA)	NM_022652; NM_001946	NM_026268
RefSeq (protein)	NP_001937; NP_073143	NP_080544
Location (UCSC)	Chr 12: 89.35 – 89.35 Mb	Chr 10: 99.1 – 99.1 Mb
PubMed search
- Wikidata
View/Edit Human	View/Edit Mouse

Dual specificity phosphatase 6 (DUSP6) is a phosphatase enzyme that is encoded by the DUSP6 gene in humans.

== Function ==
DUSP6 is a member of the dual specificity protein phosphatase subfamily. These phosphatases inactivate their target kinases by dephosphorylating both the phosphoserine/threonine and phosphotyrosine residues. They negatively regulate members of the mitogen-activated protein (MAP) kinase superfamily (MAPK/ERK, SAPK/JNK, p38), which are associated with cellular proliferation and differentiation.

DUSP6 inactivates ERK2 and is expressed in a variety of tissues with the highest levels in heart and pancreas and, unlike most other members of this family, is localized in the cytoplasm.

Two transcript variants encoding different isoforms have been found for this gene.

== Interactions ==
DUSP6 has been shown to interact with MAPK3.
