= DUSP1 =

Protein-coding gene in the species Homo sapiens

Identifiers
- Aliases: DUSP1, CL100, HVH1, MKP-1, MKP1, PTPN10, dual specificity phosphatase 1
- External IDs: OMIM: 600714; MGI: 105120; GeneCards: DUSP1
Enzyme activity
EC #	BRENDA	ExPASy	KEGG	MetaCyc
3.1.3.16	↗	↗	↗	↗
3.1.3.48	↗	↗	↗	↗

Gene location (Human)
Chr.	Chromosome 5 (human)
Band	5q35.1	Start	172,768,096 bp
Band	5q35.1	End	172,771,195 bp

Gene location (Mouse)
Chr.	Chromosome 17 (mouse)
Band	17 A3.3|17 13.28 cM	Start	26,724,564 bp
Band	17 A3.3|17 13.28 cM	End	26,781,102 bp
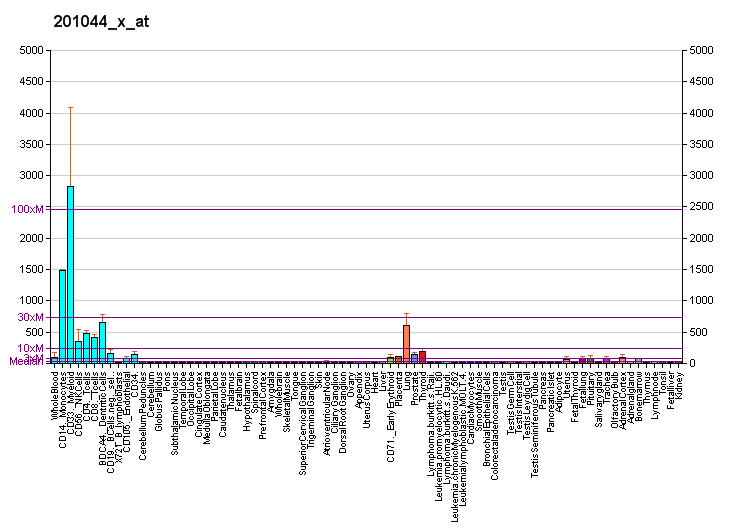

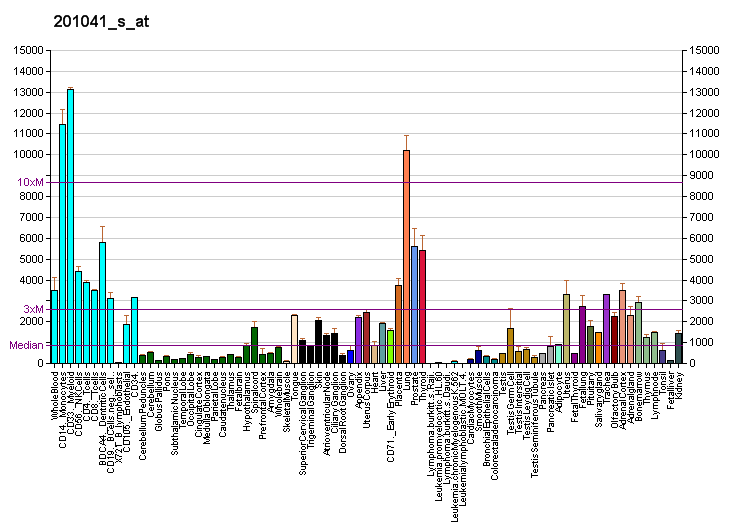
RNA expression pattern
Bgee	Human / Mouse (ortholog); Top expressed in: vena cava; nipple; urethra; mucosa of paranasal sinus; skin of thigh; mucosa of urinary bladder; cardia; lower lobe of lung; saphenous vein; trachea / Top expressed in: granulocyte; stroma of bone marrow; endothelial cell of lymphatic vessel; right lung; right lung lobe; plantaris muscle; ascending aorta; soleus muscle; ankle; left lobe of liver; More reference expression data
BioGPS	More reference expression data
Gene ontology
Molecular function	protein tyrosine/threonine phosphatase activity; phosphatase activity; protein tyrosine phosphatase activity; protein binding; phosphoprotein phosphatase activity; MAP kinase tyrosine/serine/threonine phosphatase activity; non-membrane spanning protein tyrosine phosphatase activity; hydrolase activity; protein tyrosine/serine/threonine phosphatase activity; growth factor binding; protein serine/threonine phosphatase activity; mitogen-activated protein kinase binding
Cellular component	nucleus; cytoplasm
Biological process	positive regulation of apoptotic process; response to estradiol; response to retinoic acid; response to oxidative stress; negative regulation of meiotic cell cycle; response to calcium ion; response to hydrogen peroxide; response to testosterone; protein dephosphorylation; intracellular signal transduction; negative regulation of MAP kinase activity; negative regulation of MAPK cascade; peptidyl-threonine dephosphorylation; cell cycle; response to light stimulus; negative regulation of DNA biosynthetic process; negative regulation of ERK1 and ERK2 cascade; cellular response to hormone stimulus; dephosphorylation; regulation of apoptotic process; response to glucocorticoid; endoderm formation; response to organic substance; regulation of mitotic cell cycle spindle assembly checkpoint; negative regulation of apoptotic process; response to cAMP; negative regulation of cell population proliferation; peptidyl-tyrosine dephosphorylation; peptidyl-serine dephosphorylation; negative regulation of cell adhesion; negative regulation of monocyte chemotaxis; negative regulation of p38MAPK cascade; cellular response to chemokine
Sources:Amigo / QuickGO
Orthologs
Databases	NCBI: entry; OMA: entry
Species	Human	Mouse
Entrez	1843	19252
Ensembl	ENSG00000120129	ENSMUSG00000024190
UniProt	P28562	P28563
RefSeq (mRNA)	NM_004417	NM_013642
RefSeq (protein)	NP_004408	NP_038670
Location (UCSC)	Chr 5: 172.77 – 172.77 Mb	Chr 17: 26.72 – 26.78 Mb
PubMed search
- Wikidata
View/Edit Human	View/Edit Mouse

Dual specificity protein phosphatase 1 is an enzyme that in humans is encoded by the DUSP1 gene.

== Function ==
The expression of DUSP1 gene is induced in human skin fibroblasts by oxidative/heat stress and growth factors. It specifies a protein with structural features similar to members of the non-receptor-type protein-tyrosine phosphatase family, and which has significant amino-acid sequence similarity to a Tyr/Ser-protein phosphatase encoded by the late gene H1 of vaccinia virus. The bacterially expressed and purified DUSP1 protein has intrinsic phosphatase activity, and specifically inactivates mitogen-activated protein (MAP) kinase in vitro by the concomitant dephosphorylation of both its phosphothreonine and phosphotyrosine residues. Furthermore, it suppresses the activation of MAP kinase by oncogenic ras in extracts of Xenopus oocytes. Thus, DUSP1 may play an important role in the human cellular response to environmental stress as well as in the negative regulation of cellular proliferation.

== Interactions ==
DUSP1 has been shown to interact with MAPK14, MAPK1 and MAPK8.
