= DUSP16 =

Protein-coding gene in humans

Identifiers
- Aliases: DUSP16, MKP-7, MKP7, dual specificity phosphatase 16
- External IDs: OMIM: 607175; MGI: 1917936; GeneCards: DUSP16
Available structures
| PDB | Human UniProt search: PDBe RCSB |
| PDB | List of PDB id codes 2VSW, 3TG3, 4YR8 |
Enzyme activity
| EC # | BRENDA | ExPASy | KEGG | MetaCyc |
|---|---|---|---|---|
| 3.1.3.16 | ↗ | ↗ | ↗ | ↗ |
| 3.1.3.48 | ↗ | ↗ | ↗ | ↗ |

Gene location (Human)
| Chr. | Chromosome 12 (human) |
| Band | 12p13.2 | Start | 12,473,282 bp |
| Band | 12p13.2 | End | 12,562,863 bp |

Gene location (Mouse)
| Chr. | Chromosome 6 (mouse) |
| Band | 6 G1|6 65.77 cM | Start | 134,692,431 bp |
| Band | 6 G1|6 65.77 cM | End | 134,769,588 bp |
RNA expression pattern
| Bgee | Human / Mouse (ortholog); Top expressed in: corpus callosum; ventricular zone; tonsil; right adrenal cortex; left adrenal gland; left adrenal cortex; liver; islet of Langerhans; duodenum; epithelium of colon / Top expressed in: saccule; transitional epithelium of urinary bladder; otic placode; otic vesicle; conjunctival fornix; vestibular membrane of cochlear duct; lacrimal gland; right lung lobe; epidermis; hair follicle; More reference expression data |
| BioGPS | n/a |
Gene ontology
| Molecular function | protein tyrosine phosphatase activity; MAP kinase tyrosine/serine/threonine phosphatase activity; phosphoprotein phosphatase activity; hydrolase activity; protein tyrosine/serine/threonine phosphatase activity; phosphatase activity |
| Cellular component | cytoplasm; cytosol; cytoplasmic vesicle; nucleus; nucleoplasm |
| Biological process | MAPK export from nucleus; protein dephosphorylation; peptidyl-tyrosine dephosphorylation; MAPK phosphatase export from nucleus, leptomycin B sensitive; negative regulation of MAPK cascade; dephosphorylation |
Sources:Amigo / QuickGO
Orthologs
| Databases | NCBI: entry; OMA: entry |
| Species | Human | Mouse |
| Entrez | 80824 | 70686 |
| Ensembl | ENSG00000280962; ENSG00000111266 | ENSMUSG00000030203 |
| UniProt | Q9BY84 | n/a |
| RefSeq (mRNA) | NM_030640 | NM_001048054; NM_130447; NM_181320 |
| RefSeq (protein) | NP_085143; NP_085143.1 | n/a |
| Location (UCSC) | Chr 12: 12.47 – 12.56 Mb | Chr 6: 134.69 – 134.77 Mb |
| PubMed search |
- Wikidata
| View/Edit Human | View/Edit Mouse |

Dual specificity protein phosphatase 16 is an enzyme that in humans is encoded by the DUSP16 gene.

The activation of mitogen-activated protein kinase (MAPK) cascades transduces various extracellular signals to the nucleus to induce gene expression, cell proliferation, differentiation, cell cycle arrest, and apoptosis. For full activation of MAPKs, dual-specificity kinases phosphorylate both threonine and tyrosine residues in MAPK TXY motifs. MKPs are dual-specificity phosphatases that dephosphorylate the TXY motif, thereby negatively regulating MAPK activity.[supplied by OMIM]

== Interactions ==
DUSP16 has been shown to interact with MAPK14 and MAPK8IP1.
