= SSH1 =

Protein-coding gene in the species Homo sapiens

Identifiers
- Aliases: SSH1, SSH1L, slingshot protein phosphatase 1
- External IDs: OMIM: 606778; MGI: 2686240; GeneCards: SSH1
Enzyme activity
EC #	BRENDA	ExPASy	KEGG	MetaCyc
3.1.3.16	↗	↗	↗	↗
3.1.3.48	↗	↗	↗	↗

Gene location (Human)
Chr.	Chromosome 12 (human)
Band	12q24.11	Start	108,778,191 bp
Band	12q24.11	End	108,857,590 bp

Gene location (Mouse)
Chr.	Chromosome 5 (mouse)
Band	5|5 F	Start	114,075,155 bp
Band	5|5 F	End	114,131,955 bp
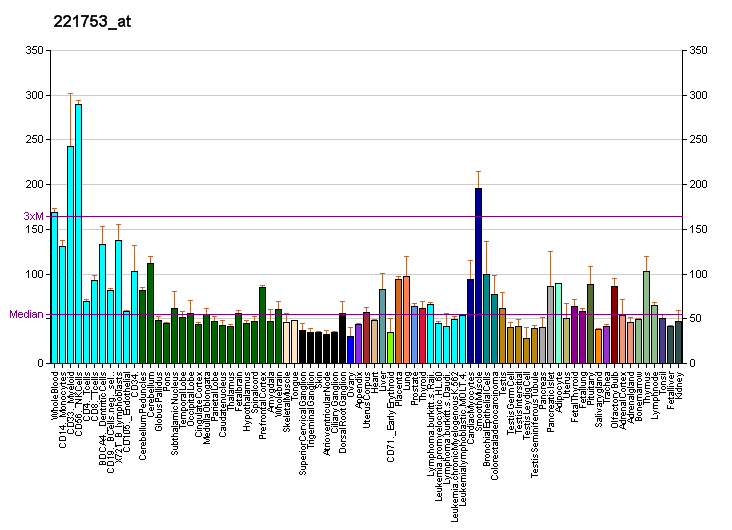
RNA expression pattern
Bgee	Human / Mouse (ortholog); Top expressed in: sural nerve; stromal cell of endometrium; saphenous vein; secondary oocyte; trigeminal ganglion; lower lobe of lung; lactiferous duct; tail of epididymis; spinal ganglia; caput epididymis / Top expressed in: internal carotid artery; Rostral migratory stream; external carotid artery; sciatic nerve; substantia nigra; fossa; blood; Gonadal ridge; ciliary body; cumulus cell; More reference expression data
BioGPS	More reference expression data
Gene ontology
Molecular function	phosphoprotein phosphatase activity; phosphatase activity; protein binding; protein tyrosine phosphatase activity; actin binding; hydrolase activity; protein tyrosine/serine/threonine phosphatase activity
Cellular component	cytoplasm; cell projection; plasma membrane; midbody; cleavage furrow; cytoskeleton; lamellipodium; cytosol; growth cone; cell leading edge; membrane; integral component of membrane
Biological process	regulation of lamellipodium assembly; protein dephosphorylation; regulation of axonogenesis; regulation of actin polymerization or depolymerization; cell morphogenesis; regulation of cellular protein metabolic process; peptidyl-tyrosine dephosphorylation; cellular response to ATP; actin cytoskeleton organization; dephosphorylation; positive regulation of synaptic plasticity; excitatory chemical synaptic transmission; positive regulation of neuron death; positive regulation of AMPA glutamate receptor clustering; positive regulation of vascular associated smooth muscle cell migration; positive regulation of excitatory postsynaptic potential
Sources:Amigo / QuickGO
Orthologs
Databases	NCBI: entry; OMA: entry
Species	Human	Mouse
Entrez	54434	231637
Ensembl	ENSG00000084112	ENSMUSG00000042121
UniProt	Q8WYL5	Q76I79
RefSeq (mRNA)	NM_001161330; NM_001161331; NM_018984	NM_198109; NM_001363469
RefSeq (protein)	NP_001154802; NP_001154803; NP_061857	NP_932777; NP_001350398
Location (UCSC)	Chr 12: 108.78 – 108.86 Mb	Chr 5: 114.08 – 114.13 Mb
PubMed search
- Wikidata
View/Edit Human	View/Edit Mouse

Protein phosphatase Slingshot homolog 1 is an enzyme that in humans is encoded by the SSH1 gene.

The ADF (actin-depolymerizing factor)/cofilin family (see MIM 601442) is composed of stimulus-responsive mediators of actin dynamics. ADF/cofilin proteins are inactivated by kinases such as LIM domain kinase-1 (LIMK1; MIM 601329). The SSH family appears to play a role in actin dynamics by reactivating ADF/cofilin proteins in vivo (Niwa et al., 2002).[supplied by OMIM]
