= Protein kinase domain =

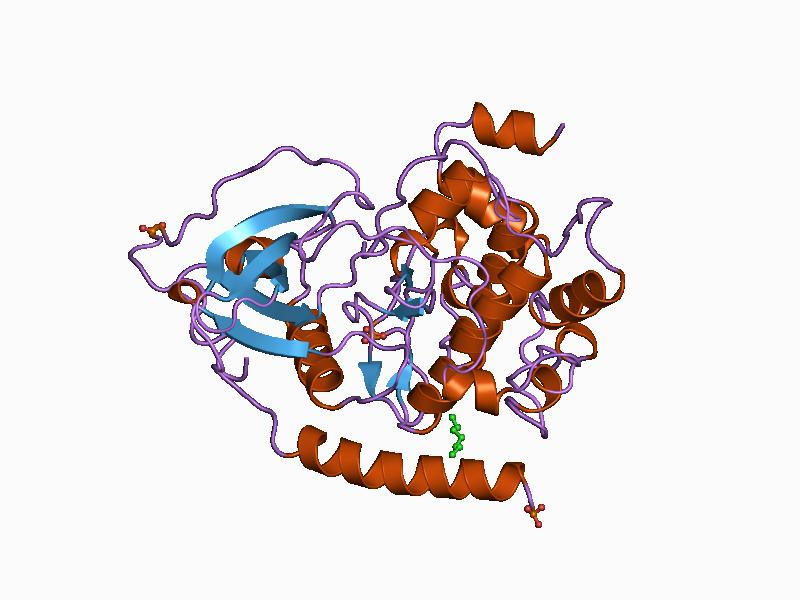
- Structure of the catalytic subunit of cAMP-dependent protein kinase.

Identifiers
- Symbol: Pkinase
- Pfam: PF00069
- InterPro: IPR000719
- SMART: TyrKc
- PROSITE: PDOC00100
- SCOP2: 1apm / SCOPe / SUPFAM
- OPM superfamily: 186
- CDD: cd00180
- Membranome: 3
Available protein structures:
- PDB: IPR000719 PF00069 (ECOD; PDBsum)
- AlphaFold: IPR000719; PF00069

The protein kinase domain is a structurally conserved protein domain containing the catalytic function of protein kinases. Protein kinases are a group of enzymes that move a phosphate group onto proteins, in a process called phosphorylation. This functions as an on/off switch for many cellular processes, including metabolism, transcription, cell cycle progression, cytoskeletal rearrangement and cell movement, apoptosis, and differentiation. They also function in embryonic development, physiological responses, and in the nervous and immune system. Abnormal phosphorylation causes many human diseases, including cancer, and drugs that affect phosphorylation can treat those diseases.

Protein kinases possess a catalytic subunit which transfers the gamma phosphate from nucleoside triphosphates (almost always ATP) to the side chain of an amino acid in a protein, resulting in a conformational and/or dynamic changes affecting protein function. These enzymes fall into two broad classes, characterised with respect to substrate specificity: serine/threonine specific and tyrosine specific.

== Function ==
Protein kinase function has been evolutionarily conserved from Escherichia coli to Homo sapiens. Protein kinases play a role in a multitude of cellular processes, including division, proliferation, apoptosis, and differentiation. Phosphorylation usually results in a functional change of the target protein by changing structure, dynamics, enzyme activity, cellular location, or association with other proteins.

== Structure ==
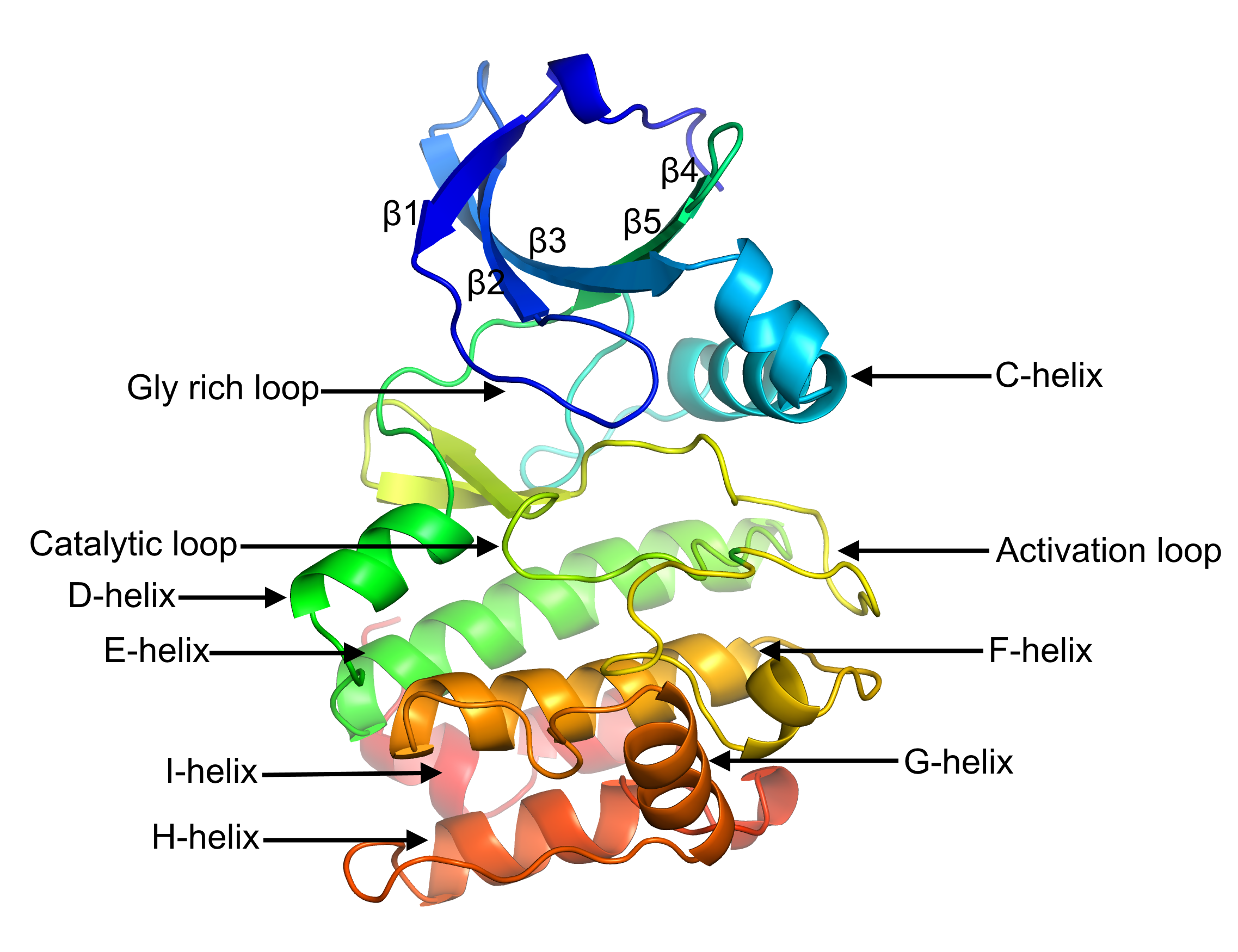
Structure of Aurora A kinase (PDB: 3E5A) with labeled elements of secondary structure

The catalytic subunits of protein kinases are highly conserved, and the structures of over 280 of the approximately 494 kinase domains from 481 human genes have been determined, leading to large screens to develop kinase-specific inhibitors for the treatments of a number of diseases. Humans have only 437 kinase domains that have catalytic activity; the rest are pseudokinases or catalyze other reactions.

Eukaryotic protein kinases are enzymes that belong to a very extensive family of proteins which share a conserved catalytic core common with both serine/threonine and tyrosine protein kinases. The domain consists of two sub-domains referred to as the N- and C-terminal domains. The N-terminal domain consists of five beta sheet strands and an alpha helix called the C-helix, and the C-terminal domain usually consists of six alpha helices (labeled D, E, F, G, H, and I). The C-terminal domain contains two long loops, called the catalytic loop and the activation loop, which are essential for catalytic activity. The catalytic loop includes the "HRD motif" (for the amino acid sequence His-Arg-Asp), whose aspartic acid residue interacts directly with the hydroxyl group of the target serine, threonine, or tyrosine residue that is phosphorylated.

The activation loop starts with the DFG motif (for the amino acid sequence Asp-Phe-Gly), which helps to bind ATP and magnesium in the active site. Broadly, the state or conformation of the kinase may be classified as DFGin or DFGout, depending on whether the Asp residue of the DFG motif is in or out of the active site. In the active form, the first few residues and last few residues of the activation loop adopt a specific conformation required for binding ATP, two magnesium ions, and substrate. Some inactive structures may adopt one of several other DFGin conformations, while other inactive structures are DFGout.

== Examples ==
The following is a list of human proteins containing the protein kinase domain:

AAK1 ; AATK ; ABL1 ; ABL2 ; ACVR1 ; ACVR1B ; ACVR1C ; ACVR2A ; ACVR2B ; ACVRL1 ; AKT1 ; AKT2 ; AKT3 ; ALK ; AMHR2 ; ANKK1 ; ARAF ; AURKA ; AURKB ; AURKC ; AXL ; BLK ; BMP2K ; BMPR1A ; BMPR1B ; BMPR2 ; BMX ; BRAF ; BRSK1 ; BRSK2 ; BTK ; BUB1 ; BUB1B ; CAMK1 ; CAMK1D ; CAMK1G ; CAMK2A ; CAMK2B ; CAMK2D ; CAMK2G ; CAMK4 ; CAMKK1 ; CAMKK2 ; CAMKV ; CASK ; CDC42BPA ; CDC42BPB ; CDC42BPG ; CDC7 ; CDK1 ; CDK10 ; CDK11A ; CDK11B ; CDK12 ; CDK13 ; CDK14 ; CDK15 ; CDK16 ; CDK17 ; CDK18 ; CDK19 ; CDK2 ; CDK20 ; CDK3 ; CDK4 ; CDK5 ; CDK6 ; CDK7 ; CDK8 ; CDK9 ; CDKL1 ; CDKL2 ; CDKL3 ; CDKL4 ; CDKL5 ; CHEK1 ; CHEK2 ; CHUK ; CIT ; CLK1 ; CLK2 ; CLK3 ; CLK4 ; CSF1R ; CSK ; CSNK1A1 ; CSNK1A1L ; CSNK1D ; CSNK1E ; CSNK1G1 ; CSNK1G2 ; CSNK1G3 ; CSNK2A1 ; CSNK2A2 ; CSNK2A3 ; DAPK1 ; DAPK2 ; DAPK3 ; DCLK1 ; DCLK2 ; DCLK3 ; DDR1 ; DDR2 ; DMPK ; DSTYK ; DYRK1A ; DYRK1B ; DYRK2 ; DYRK3 ; DYRK4 ; EGFR ; EIF2AK1 ; EIF2AK2 ; EIF2AK3 ; EIF2AK4 ; EPHA1 ; EPHA10 ; EPHA2 ; EPHA3 ; EPHA4 ; EPHA5 ; EPHA6 ; EPHA7 ; EPHA8 ; EPHB1 ; EPHB2 ; EPHB3 ; EPHB4 ; EPHB6 ; ERBB2 ; ERBB3 ; ERBB4 ; ERN1 ; ERN2 ; FER ; FES ; FGFR1 ; FGFR2 ; FGFR3 ; FGFR4 ; FGR ; FLT1 ; FLT3 ; FLT4 ; FRK ; FYN ; GAK ; GRK1 ; GRK2 ; GRK3 ; GRK4 ; GRK5 ; GRK6 ; GRK7 ; GSG2 ; GSK3A ; GSK3B ; GUCY2C ; GUCY2D ; GUCY2F ; HCK ; HIPK1 ; HIPK2 ; HIPK3 ; HIPK4 ; HUNK ; ICK ; IGF1R ; IKBKB ; IKBKE ; ILK ; INSR ; INSRR ; IRAK1 ; IRAK2 ; IRAK3 ; IRAK4 ; ITK ; JAK1 ; JAK2 ; JAK3 ; KALRN ; KDR ; KIT ; KSR1 ; KSR2 ; LATS1 ; LATS2 ; LCK ; LIMK1 ; LIMK2 ; LMTK2 ; LMTK3 ; LRRK1 ; LRRK2 ; LTK ; LYN ; MAK ; MAP2K1 ; MAP2K2 ; MAP2K3 ; MAP2K4 ; MAP2K5 ; MAP2K6 ; MAP2K7 ; MAP3K1 ; MAP3K10 ; MAP3K11 ; MAP3K12 ; MAP3K13 ; MAP3K14 ; MAP3K15 ; MAP3K19 ; MAP3K2 ; MAP3K20 ; MAP3K21 ; MAP3K3 ; MAP3K4 ; MAP3K5 ; MAP3K6 ; MAP3K7 ; MAP3K8 ; MAP3K9 ; MAP4K1 ; MAP4K2 ; MAP4K3 ; MAP4K4 ; MAP4K5 ; MAPK1 ; MAPK10 ; MAPK11 ; MAPK12 ; MAPK13 ; MAPK14 ; MAPK15 ; MAPK3 ; MAPK4 ; MAPK6 ; MAPK7 ; MAPK8 ; MAPK9 ; MAPKAPK2 ; MAPKAPK3 ; MAPKAPK5 ; MARK1 ; MARK2 ; MARK3 ; MARK4 ; MAST1 ; MAST2 ; MAST3 ; MAST4 ; MASTL ; MATK ; MELK ; MERTK ; MET ; MINK1 ; MKNK1 ; MKNK2 ; MLKL ; MOK ; MOS ; MST1R ; MUSK ; MYLK ; MYLK2 ; MYLK3 ; MYLK4 ; MYO3A ; MYO3B ; NEK1 ; NEK10 ; NEK11 ; NEK2 ; NEK3 ; NEK4 ; NEK5 ; NEK6 ; NEK7 ; NEK8 ; NEK9 ; NIM1K ; NLK ; NPR1 ; NPR2 ; NRBP1 ; NRBP2 ; NRK ; NTRK1 ; NTRK2 ; NTRK3 ; NUAK1 ; NUAK2 ; OBSCN ; OXSR1 ; PAK1 ; PAK2 ; PAK3 ; PAK4 ; PAK5 ; PAK6 ; PAN3 ; PASK ; PBK ; PDGFRA ; PDGFRB ; PDIK1L ; PDPK1 ; PDPK2P ; PEAK1 ; PEAK3 ; PHKG1 ; PHKG2 ; PIK3R4 ; PIM1 ; PIM2 ; PIM3 ; PINK1 ; PKDCC ; PKMYT1 ; PKN1 ; PKN2 ; PKN3 ; PLK1 ; PLK2 ; PLK3 ; PLK4 ; PLK5 ; PNCK ; POMK ; PRKAA1 ; PRKAA2 ; PRKACA ; PRKACB ; PRKACG ; PRKCA ; PRKCB ; PRKCD ; PRKCE ; PRKCG ; PRKCH ; PRKCI ; PRKCQ ; PRKCZ ; PRKD1 ; PRKD2 ; PRKD3 ; PRKG1 ; PRKG2 ; PRKX ; PRKY ; PRPF4B ; PSKH1 ; PSKH2 ; PTK2 ; PTK2B ; PTK6 ; PTK7 ; PXK ; RAF1 ; RET ; RIOK1 ; RIOK2 ; RIOK3 ; RIPK1 ; RIPK2 ; RIPK3 ; RIPK4 ; RNASEL ; ROCK1 ; ROCK2 ; ROR1 ; ROR2 ; ROS1 ; RPS6KA1 ; RPS6KA2 ; RPS6KA3 ; RPS6KA4 ; RPS6KA5 ; RPS6KA6 ; RPS6KB1 ; RPS6KB2 ; RPS6KC1 ; RPS6KL1 ; RSKR ; RYK ; SBK1 ; SBK2 ; SBK3 ; SCYL1 ; SCYL2 ; SCYL3 ; SGK1 ; SGK2 ; SGK223 ; SGK3 ; SIK1 ; SIK1B ; SIK2 ; SIK3 ; SLK ; SNRK ; SPEG ; SRC ; SRMS ; SRPK1 ; SRPK2 ; SRPK3 ; STK10 ; STK11 ; STK16 ; STK17A ; STK17B ; STK24 ; STK25 ; STK26 ; STK3 ; STK31 ; STK32A ; STK32B ; STK32C ; STK33 ; STK35 ; STK36 ; STK38 ; STK38L ; STK39 ; STK4 ; STK40 ; STKLD1 ; STRADA ; STRADB ; STYK1 ; SYK ; TAOK1 ; TAOK2 ; TAOK3 ; TBCK ; TBK1 ; TEC ; TEK ; TESK1 ; TESK2 ; TEX14 ; TGFBR1 ; TGFBR2 ; TIE1 ; TLK1 ; TLK2 ; TNIK ; TNK1 ; TNK2 ; TNNI3K ; TP53RK ; TRIB1 ; TRIB2 ; TRIB3 ; TRIO ; TSSK1B ; TSSK2 ; TSSK3 ; TSSK4 ; TSSK6 ; TTBK1 ; TTBK2 ; TTK ; TTN ; TXK ; TYK2 ; TYRO3 ; UHMK1 ; ULK1 ; ULK2 ; ULK3 ; ULK4 ; VRK1 ; VRK2 ; VRK3 ; WEE1 ; WEE2 ; WNK1 ; WNK2 ; WNK3 ; WNK4 ; YES1 ; ZAP70
