= UHM =

UHM and uhm may refer to:

== Acronyms ==
- Undersea and Hyperbaric Medical Society
- Malta Workers' Union (Union Haddiema Maghqudin)
- University of Hawaii at Manoa, Honolulu, USA

== People ==
Um (Korean surname). People with this surname include:

- Uhm Bok-dong (1892–1951), Korean cyclist
- Uhm Jung-hwa (born 1969), South Korean singer and actress
- Uhm Tae-woong (born 1974), South Korean actor
- Uhm Ji-won (born 1977), South Korean actress
- Uhm Tae-goo (born 1983), South Korean actor
- Uhm Hyun-kyung (born 1986), South Korean actress

== Other meanings ==
- UHMK1 (UHM), a human protein
