= DAPK2 =

Protein-coding gene in the species Homo sapiens

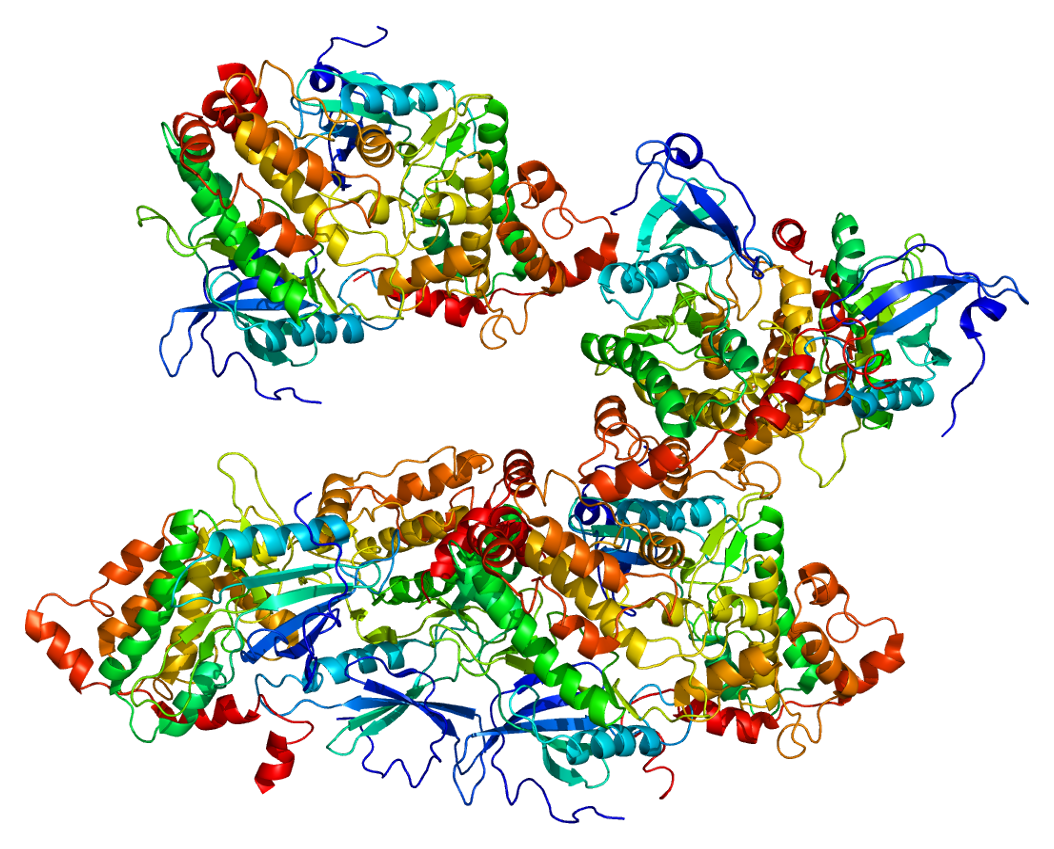

Identifiers
- Aliases: DAPK2, DRP-1, DRP1, death-associated protein kinase 2, death associated protein kinase 2
- External IDs: OMIM: 616567; MGI: 1341297; GeneCards: DAPK2
Available structures
PDB	Ortholog search: PDBe RCSB
PDB	List of PDB id codes 1WMK, 1WRZ, 1Z9X, 1ZUZ, 1ZWS, 2A27, 2A2A, 2CKE
Enzyme activity
EC #	BRENDA	ExPASy	KEGG	MetaCyc
2.7.11.1	↗	↗	↗	↗

Gene location (Human)
Chr.	Chromosome 15 (human)
Band	15q22.31	Start	63,907,036 bp
Band	15q22.31	End	64,072,033 bp

Gene location (Mouse)
Chr.	Chromosome 9 (mouse)
Band	9 C|9 35.75 cM	Start	66,158,223 bp
Band	9 C|9 35.75 cM	End	66,272,242 bp
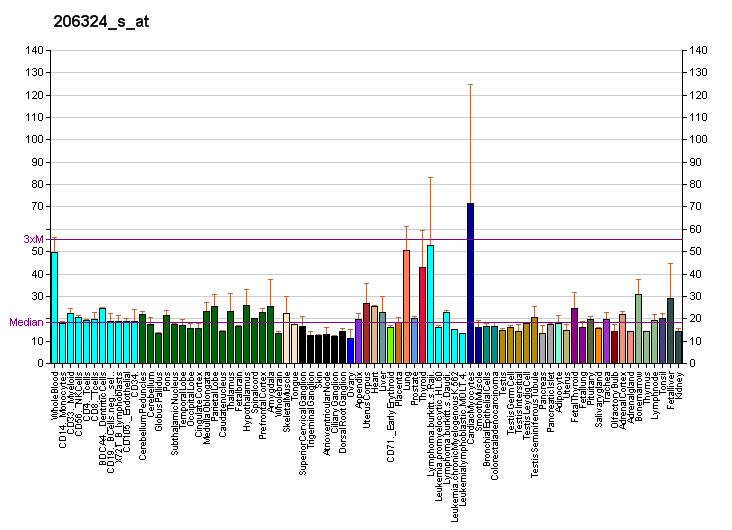

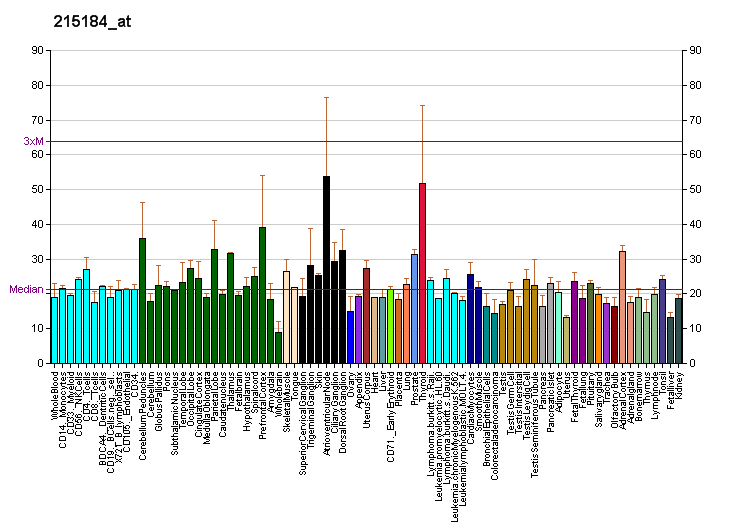
RNA expression pattern
Bgee	Human / Mouse (ortholog); Top expressed in: right lobe of thyroid gland; left lobe of thyroid gland; right auricle of heart; right lung; gastrocnemius muscle; muscle of thigh; upper lobe of left lung; left ventricle; blood; sural nerve / Top expressed in: muscle of thigh; membranous bone; body of femur; lumbar spinal ganglion; Dermatocranium; maxilla; lip; right lung; right lung lobe; tibiofemoral joint; More reference expression data
BioGPS	More reference expression data
Gene ontology
Molecular function	transferase activity; nucleotide binding; protein kinase activity; calmodulin binding; kinase activity; protein serine/threonine kinase activity; protein binding; identical protein binding; ATP binding
Cellular component	cytoplasm; autophagosome lumen; cytoplasmic vesicle; Golgi apparatus; intracellular membrane-bounded organelle; nucleus
Biological process	regulation of apoptotic process; intracellular signal transduction; regulation of intrinsic apoptotic signaling pathway; phosphorylation; protein phosphorylation; positive regulation of eosinophil chemotaxis; regulation of autophagy; anoikis; positive regulation of neutrophil chemotaxis; protein autophosphorylation; neutrophil migration; apoptotic process; peptidyl-serine phosphorylation; peptidyl-threonine phosphorylation
Sources:Amigo / QuickGO
Orthologs
Databases	NCBI: entry; OMA: entry
Species	Human	Mouse
Entrez	23604	13143
Ensembl	ENSG00000035664	ENSMUSG00000032380
UniProt	Q9UIK4	Q8VDF3
RefSeq (mRNA)	NM_014326; NM_001363730; NM_001384997; NM_001384998; NM_001384999 NM_001385000	NM_010019
RefSeq (protein)	NP_055141; NP_001350659	NP_034149; NP_001391612
Location (UCSC)	Chr 15: 63.91 – 64.07 Mb	Chr 9: 66.16 – 66.27 Mb
PubMed search
- Wikidata
View/Edit Human	View/Edit Mouse

Death-associated protein kinase 2 is an enzyme that in humans is encoded by the DAPK2 gene.

This gene encodes a protein that belongs to the serine/threonine protein kinase family. This protein contains a N-terminal protein kinase domain followed by a conserved calmodulin-binding domain with significant similarity to that of death-associated protein kinase 1 (DAPK1), a positive regulator of programmed cell death. Gene overexpression induces cell apoptosis. It uses multiple polyadenylation sites.

The DAPK2 mRNA may undergo alternative splicing to produce a DAPK3-like encoding transcript.
