= SEPTIN8 =

Protein-coding gene in the species Homo sapiens

Identifiers
- Aliases: SEPTIN8, SEP2, septin 8, SEPT8
- External IDs: OMIM: 608418; MGI: 894310; GeneCards: SEPTIN8

Gene location (Human)
Chr.	Chromosome 5 (human)
Band	5q31.1	Start	132,750,819 bp
Band	5q31.1	End	132,807,241 bp

Gene location (Mouse)
Chr.	Chromosome 11 (mouse)
Band	11 B1.3|11 31.96 cM	Start	53,410,084 bp
Band	11 B1.3|11 31.96 cM	End	53,440,392 bp
RNA expression pattern
Bgee	Human / Mouse (ortholog); Top expressed in: middle temporal gyrus; C1 segment; Brodmann area 23; endothelial cell; corpus callosum; inferior ganglion of vagus nerve; postcentral gyrus; entorhinal cortex; subthalamic nucleus; right frontal lobe / Top expressed in: facial motor nucleus; visual cortex; primary visual cortex; superior frontal gyrus; interventricular septum; cerebellar cortex; Region I of hippocampus proper; primary motor cortex; anterior horn of spinal cord; dentate gyrus of hippocampal formation granule cell; More reference expression data
BioGPS	n/a
Gene ontology
Molecular function	nucleotide binding; GTP binding; protein binding; GTPase activity; molecular adaptor activity
Cellular component	cytoplasm; cytoskeleton; septin ring; microtubule cytoskeleton; septin complex; septin filament array; presynapse; membrane; cell junction; axon; synaptic vesicle membrane; cytoplasmic vesicle; cell projection; synapse
Biological process	mitotic cytokinesis; septin ring assembly; cilium assembly; regulation of SNARE complex assembly; cytoskeleton-dependent cytokinesis
Sources:Amigo / QuickGO
Orthologs
Databases	NCBI: entry; OMA: entry
Species	Human	Mouse
Entrez	23176	20362
Ensembl	ENSG00000164402	ENSMUSG00000018398
UniProt	Q92599	Q8CHH9
RefSeq (mRNA)	NM_001098811; NM_001098812; NM_001098813; NM_001300798; NM_001300799 NM_015146	NM_001252332; NM_001252333; NM_033144; NM_001347496; NM_001361968 NM_001361969
RefSeq (protein)	NP_001092281; NP_001092282; NP_001092283; NP_001287727; NP_001287728 NP_055961	NP_001239261; NP_001239262; NP_001334425; NP_149156; NP_001348897 NP_001348898
Location (UCSC)	Chr 5: 132.75 – 132.81 Mb	Chr 11: 53.41 – 53.44 Mb
PubMed search
- Wikidata
View/Edit Human	View/Edit Mouse

Septin-8 is a protein that in humans is encoded by the SEPTIN8 gene (previously SEPT8).

== Function ==
SEPT8 is a member of the highly conserved septin family. Septins are 40- to 60-kD GTPases that assemble as filamentous scaffolds. They are involved in the organization of submembranous structures, in neuronal polarity, and in vesicle trafficking.

== Interactions ==
SEPT8 has been shown to interact with PFTK1 and SEPT5.
