= PSKH2 =

Identifiers
- Aliases: PSKH2, protein serine kinase H2
- External IDs: GeneCards: PSKH2
Enzyme activity
EC #	BRENDA	ExPASy	KEGG	MetaCyc
2.7.11.1	↗	↗	↗	↗

Gene location (Human)
Chr.	Chromosome 8 (human)
Band	8q21.3	Start	86,047,109 bp
Band	8q21.3	End	86,088,621 bp
RNA expression pattern
Bgee	Human / Mouse (ortholog); Top expressed in: testicle; human kidney; renal cortex; placenta; thigh; muscle of thigh; prefrontal cortex; substantia nigra / n/a; More reference expression data
BioGPS	n/a
Gene ontology
Molecular function	transferase activity; nucleotide binding; protein kinase activity; ATP binding; kinase activity; protein serine/threonine kinase activity
Cellular component	intracellular anatomical structure
Biological process	protein phosphorylation; phosphorylation; peptidyl-serine phosphorylation; peptidyl-threonine phosphorylation; intracellular signal transduction
Sources:Amigo / QuickGO
Orthologs
Databases	NCBI: entry; OMA: entry
Species	Human	Mouse
Entrez	85481	n/a
Ensembl	ENSG00000147613	n/a
UniProt	Q96QS6	n/a
RefSeq (mRNA)	NM_033126	n/a
RefSeq (protein)	NP_149117	n/a
Location (UCSC)	Chr 8: 86.05 – 86.09 Mb	n/a
PubMed search		n/a
- Wikidata
View/Edit Human

Protein Serine/threonine-protein kinase H2 is a Ser/Thr protein pseudokinase that is encoded by the PSKH2 gene, and forms part of the CAMK subfamily of protein kinases. Homologues of PSKH2 are absent in rodents, but a PSKH2-like sequence is present in most vertebrate genomes. PSKH2 does not bind to ATP, nor does it phosphorylate any known substrate in cells, simplistically because it lacks the catalytic Asp residue in the HRD motif. The PSKH2 protein interactome is complex, and involves a number of membrane-associated proteins alongside the HSP90 Cdc37 molecular chaperone complex. PSKH2 exhibits significant sequence homology to the catalytically active Ser/Thr kinase PSKH1.
