= OXSR1 =

Protein-coding gene in the species Homo sapiens

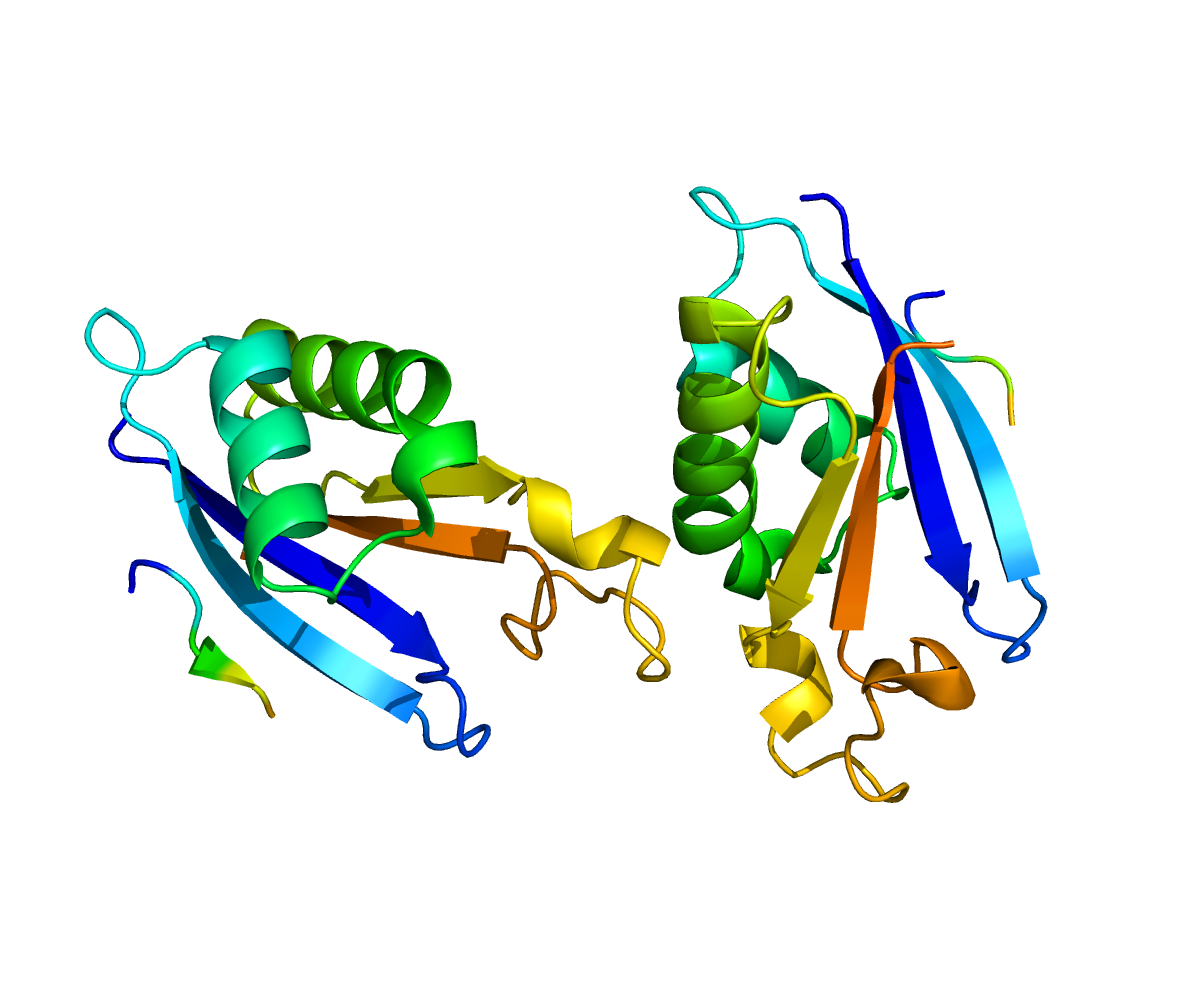

Identifiers
- Aliases: OXSR1, OSR1, oxidative stress responsive 1, oxidative stress responsive kinase 1
- External IDs: OMIM: 604046; MGI: 1917378; GeneCards: OXSR1
Available structures
PDB	Ortholog search: PDBe RCSB
PDB	List of PDB id codes 2V3S, 2VWI, 3DAK
Enzyme activity
EC #	BRENDA	ExPASy	KEGG	MetaCyc
2.7.11.1	↗	↗	↗	↗

Gene location (Human)
Chr.	Chromosome 3 (human)
Band	3p22.2	Start	38,165,089 bp
Band	3p22.2	End	38,255,484 bp

Gene location (Mouse)
Chr.	Chromosome 9 (mouse)
Band	9|9 F3	Start	119,067,498 bp
Band	9|9 F3	End	119,151,493 bp
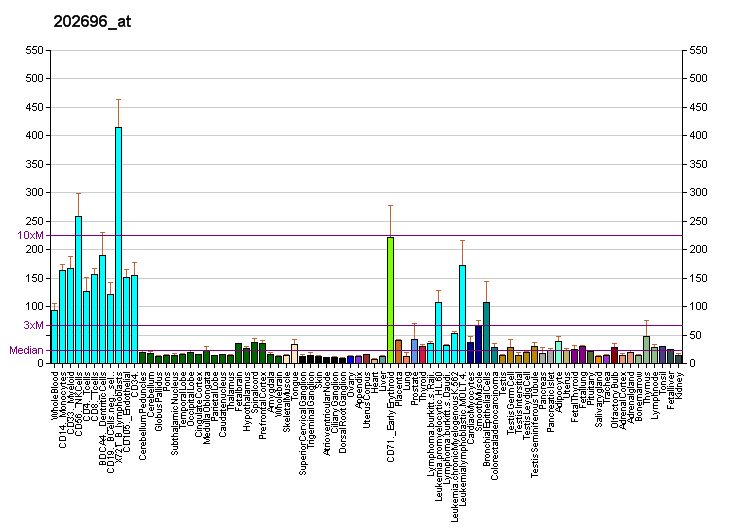
RNA expression pattern
Bgee	Human / Mouse (ortholog); Top expressed in: buccal mucosa cell; Skeletal muscle tissue of rectus abdominis; mucosa of pharynx; body of tongue; saphenous vein; gastrocnemius muscle; embryo; ganglionic eminence; glutes; ventricular zone / Top expressed in: muscle of thigh; skeletal muscle tissue; genital tubercle; quadriceps femoris muscle; cumulus cell; tail of embryo; knee joint; triceps brachii muscle; ankle; medullary collecting duct; More reference expression data
BioGPS	More reference expression data
Gene ontology
Molecular function	magnesium ion binding; protein kinase activity; protein binding; kinase activity; metal ion binding; nucleotide binding; transferase activity; ATP binding; protein serine/threonine kinase activity; identical protein binding; protein kinase binding
Cellular component	extracellular exosome; cytoplasm; cytosol
Biological process	response to oxidative stress; negative regulation of potassium ion transmembrane transport; cellular hypotonic response; phosphorylation; negative regulation of potassium ion transmembrane transporter activity; protein phosphorylation; peptidyl-threonine phosphorylation; intracellular signal transduction; regulation of mitotic cell cycle; signal transduction; stress-activated protein kinase signaling cascade; activation of protein kinase activity; regulation of apoptotic process; osmosensory signaling pathway; positive regulation of T cell chemotaxis; chemokine (C-C motif) ligand 21 signaling pathway; chemokine (C-X-C motif) ligand 12 signaling pathway; protein autophosphorylation; cellular response to chemokine
Sources:Amigo / QuickGO
Orthologs
Databases	NCBI: entry; OMA: entry
Species	Human	Mouse
Entrez	9943	108737
Ensembl	ENSG00000172939	ENSMUSG00000036737
UniProt	O95747	Q6P9R2
RefSeq (mRNA)	NM_005109	NM_133985; NM_001359582
RefSeq (protein)	NP_005100	NP_598746; NP_001346511
Location (UCSC)	Chr 3: 38.17 – 38.26 Mb	Chr 9: 119.07 – 119.15 Mb
PubMed search
- Wikidata
View/Edit Human	View/Edit Mouse

Serine/threonine-protein kinase OSR1 is an enzyme that in humans is encoded by the OXSR1 gene.

The product of this gene belongs to the Ser/Thr protein kinase family of proteins. It regulates downstream kinases in response to environmental stress, and may play a role in regulating the actin cytoskeleton.
