= STK31 =

Protein-coding gene found in humans

Identifiers
- Aliases: STK31, SGK396, TDRD8, serine/threonine kinase 31
- External IDs: OMIM: 605790; MGI: 1924735; GeneCards: STK31
Enzyme activity
EC #	BRENDA	ExPASy	KEGG	MetaCyc
2.7.11.1	↗	↗	↗	↗

Gene location (Human)
Chr.	Chromosome 7 (human)
Band	7p15.3	Start	23,710,203 bp
Band	7p15.3	End	23,832,513 bp

Gene location (Mouse)
Chr.	Chromosome 6 (mouse)
Band	6|6 B2.3	Start	49,372,538 bp
Band	6|6 B2.3	End	49,446,435 bp
RNA expression pattern
Bgee	Human / Mouse (ortholog); Top expressed in: testicle; right testis; left testis; secondary oocyte; germinal epithelium; sperm; gonad; buccal mucosa cell; sural nerve; cerebellar hemisphere / Top expressed in: spermatocyte; Gonadal ridge; spermatid; seminiferous tubule; primary oocyte; secondary oocyte; zygote; morula; blastocyst; embryo; More reference expression data
BioGPS	n/a
Gene ontology
Molecular function	kinase activity; protein serine/threonine kinase activity; protein kinase activity; ATP binding; nucleotide binding; transferase activity; nuclease activity; RNA binding
Cellular component	acrosomal vesicle; nucleus; cytoplasm
Biological process	phosphorylation; protein phosphorylation; RNA catabolic process; nucleic acid phosphodiester bond hydrolysis
Sources:Amigo / QuickGO
Orthologs
Databases	NCBI: entry; OMA: entry
Species	Human	Mouse
Entrez	56164	77485
Ensembl	ENSG00000196335	ENSMUSG00000023403
UniProt	Q9BXU1	Q99MW1
RefSeq (mRNA)	NM_001122833; NM_001260504; NM_001260505; NM_031414; NM_032944	NM_029916; NM_001381960
RefSeq (protein)	NP_001247433; NP_001247434; NP_113602; NP_116562	NP_084192; NP_001368889
Location (UCSC)	Chr 7: 23.71 – 23.83 Mb	Chr 6: 49.37 – 49.45 Mb
PubMed search
- Wikidata
View/Edit Human	View/Edit Mouse

Serine/threonine-protein kinase 31 is a protein that in humans is encoded by the STK31 gene. Not much has been reported about the precise function of this protein. While this protein is part of the serine/threonine protein kinase family of enzymes, the conserved aspargine in the predicted active site has been replaced with a serine.

The protein also notably contains a coiled coil and a tudor domain. Many tudor domain-containing (TDRD) proteins play a vital role in sperm production, but STK31 knock-out were still fertile, suggesting that its role in spermatogenesis may be redundant.
