= NEK7 =

Human protein-coding gene

Identifiers
- Aliases: NEK7, NIMA related kinase 7
- External IDs: OMIM: 606848; MGI: 1890645; GeneCards: NEK7
Available structures
| PDB | Ortholog search: PDBe RCSB |
| PDB | List of PDB id codes 2WQM, 2WQN, 5DE2 |
Enzyme activity
| EC # | BRENDA | ExPASy | KEGG | MetaCyc |
|---|---|---|---|---|
| 2.7.11.34 | ↗ | ↗ | ↗ | ↗ |

Gene location (Human)
| Chr. | Chromosome 1 (human) |
| Band | 1q31.3 | Start | 198,156,994 bp |
| Band | 1q31.3 | End | 198,322,420 bp |

Gene location (Mouse)
| Chr. | Chromosome 1 (mouse) |
| Band | 1 E4|1 60.82 cM | Start | 138,410,613 bp |
| Band | 1 E4|1 60.82 cM | End | 138,547,879 bp |
RNA expression pattern
| Bgee | Human / Mouse (ortholog); Top expressed in: right ventricle; myocardium; germinal epithelium; myocardium of left ventricle; glutes; cardiac muscle tissue of right atrium; superficial temporal artery; Achilles tendon; mucosa of paranasal sinus; Skeletal muscle tissue of biceps brachii / Top expressed in: extensor digitorum longus muscle; sciatic nerve; habenula; vastus lateralis muscle; plantaris muscle; triceps brachii muscle; gastrula; gastrocnemius muscle; aortic valve; tibialis anterior muscle; More reference expression data |
| BioGPS | n/a |
Gene ontology
| Molecular function | transferase activity; nucleotide binding; protein kinase activity; metal ion binding; kinase activity; protein serine/threonine kinase activity; ATP binding; protein binding |
| Cellular component | cytoplasm; spindle pole; nucleoplasm; microtubule organizing center; microtubule; cytoskeleton; nucleus |
| Biological process | positive regulation of telomere capping; phosphorylation; positive regulation of telomere maintenance via telomerase; spindle assembly; protein phosphorylation; positive regulation of telomerase activity; regulation of mitotic cell cycle |
Sources:Amigo / QuickGO
Orthologs
| Databases | NCBI: entry; OMA: entry |
| Species | Human | Mouse |
| Entrez | 140609 | 59125 |
| Ensembl | ENSG00000151414 | ENSMUSG00000026393 |
| UniProt | Q8TDX7 | Q9ES74 |
| RefSeq (mRNA) | NM_133494 | NM_021605; NM_001311148 |
| RefSeq (protein) | NP_598001 | NP_001298077; NP_067618 |
| Location (UCSC) | Chr 1: 198.16 – 198.32 Mb | Chr 1: 138.41 – 138.55 Mb |
| PubMed search |
- Wikidata
| View/Edit Human | View/Edit Mouse |

NIMA-related kinase 7 (NEK7) is a serine/threonine-protein kinase that in humans is encoded by the NEK7 gene.

NEK7 plays a role in cell division, particularly in the regulation of mitosis and microtubule organization. It also participates in the activation of the NLRP3 inflammasome, a protein complex involved in the innate immune response and inflammation. Dysregulation of NEK7 has been implicated in several types of cancer and chronic inflammatory diseases, making it a potential therapeutic target.
