= STK35 =

Protein-coding gene in the species Homo sapiens

Identifiers
- Aliases: STK35, serine/threonine kinase 35, CLIK1, STK35L1, Serine/threonine kinase 35
- External IDs: OMIM: 609370; MGI: 1914583; GeneCards: STK35
Enzyme activity
EC #	BRENDA	ExPASy	KEGG	MetaCyc
2.7.11.1	↗	↗	↗	↗

Gene location (Human)
Chr.	Chromosome 20 (human)
Band	20p13	Start	2,101,827 bp
Band	20p13	End	2,177,038 bp

Gene location (Mouse)
Chr.	Chromosome 2 (mouse)
Band	2|2 F1	Start	129,642,437 bp
Band	2|2 F1	End	129,674,207 bp
RNA expression pattern
Bgee	Human / Mouse (ortholog); Top expressed in: secondary oocyte; endothelial cell; Brodmann area 23; amniotic fluid; parietal pleura; pancreatic epithelial cell; gingival epithelium; parotid gland; visceral pleura; palpebral conjunctiva / Top expressed in: neural layer of retina; zygote; secondary oocyte; primary oocyte; spermatid; Meckel's cartilage; ascending aorta; occiput; spermatocyte; Gonadal ridge; More reference expression data
BioGPS	n/a
Gene ontology
Molecular function	transferase activity; nucleotide binding; protein kinase activity; protein serine/threonine kinase activity; ATP binding; kinase activity
Cellular component	cytoplasm; nucleolus; nucleus; nuclear body
Biological process	protein phosphorylation; phosphorylation; meiosis
Sources:Amigo / QuickGO
Orthologs
Databases	NCBI: entry; OMA: entry
Species	Human	Mouse
Entrez	140901	67333
Ensembl	ENSG00000125834	ENSMUSG00000037885
UniProt	Q8TDR2	Q80ZW0
RefSeq (mRNA)	NM_080836	NM_001038635; NM_183262
RefSeq (protein)	NP_543026	NP_001033724; NP_899085
Location (UCSC)	Chr 20: 2.1 – 2.18 Mb	Chr 2: 129.64 – 129.67 Mb
PubMed search
- Wikidata
View/Edit Human	View/Edit Mouse

Serine/threonine-protein kinase 35 is a protein that in humans is encoded by the STK35 gene (previously STK35L1). It is a member of the NKF4 (New Kinase Family 4) Ser/Thr kinases (STK) family and classified in group "Other" in the human kinome. Previously, STK35L1 was named as Clik1 (CLP36 Interacting Kinase 1) based on a study that showed an association of STK35 with CLP36 after overexpression of both proteins in osteosarcoma cells. Clik1 gene described by Vallenius et al. code for a protein of 501 amino acids. Later, Goyal et al. found that coding sequence of the STK35 gene is incomplete. The newly identified sequence of the STK35 gene codes for a protein of 534 amino acids with a N-terminal elongation of 133 amino acids. It has been designated as STK35L1.

== Functions ==
STK35L1 is predominantly found in the nucleus and the nucleolus. Nuclear actin was identified as a novel binding partner of STK35L1. However, it can interact with PDLIM1/CLP-36 in the cytoplasm and localize to actin stress fibers. STK35L1 regulates the expression of CDKN2A and inhibiting G1- to S-phase transition. Depletion of STK35L1 by siRNA impaired endothelial cell migration. STK35L1 may act as a central kinase linking the cell cycle and migration of endothelial cells.
