= AAK1 =

Protein-coding gene in humans

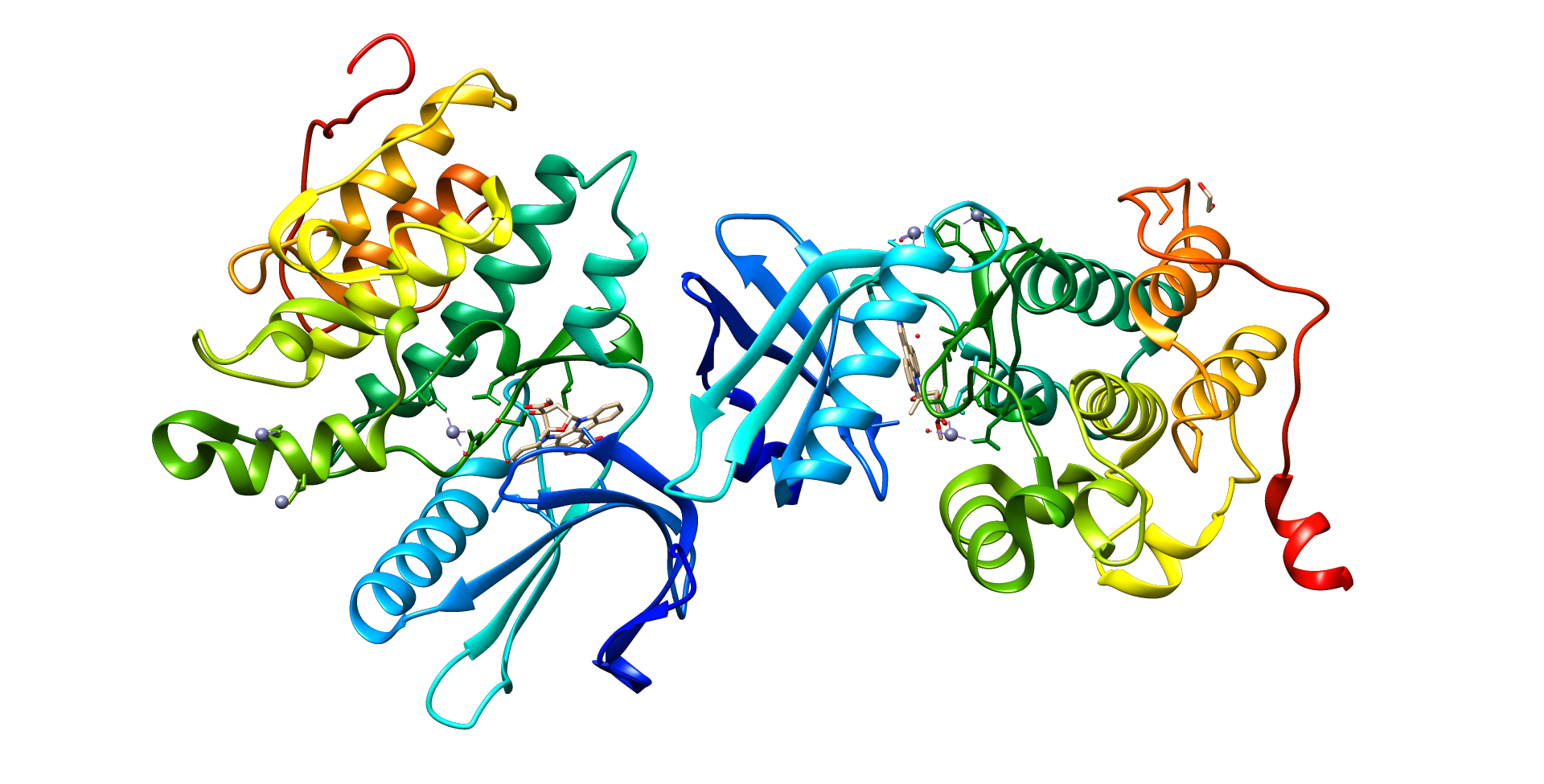

Identifiers
- Aliases: AAK1, AP2 associated kinase 1
- External IDs: OMIM: 616405; MGI: 1098687; GeneCards: AAK1
Available structures
PDB	Ortholog search: PDBe RCSB
PDB	List of PDB id codes 4WSQ, 5L4Q
Enzyme activity
EC #	BRENDA	ExPASy	KEGG	MetaCyc
2.7.11.1	↗	↗	↗	↗

Gene location (Human)
Chr.	Chromosome 2 (human)
Band	2p13.3	Start	69,457,997 bp
Band	2p13.3	End	69,674,349 bp

Gene location (Mouse)
Chr.	Chromosome 6 (mouse)
Band	6 D1|6 37.75 cM	Start	86,849,517 bp
Band	6 D1|6 37.75 cM	End	87,003,223 bp
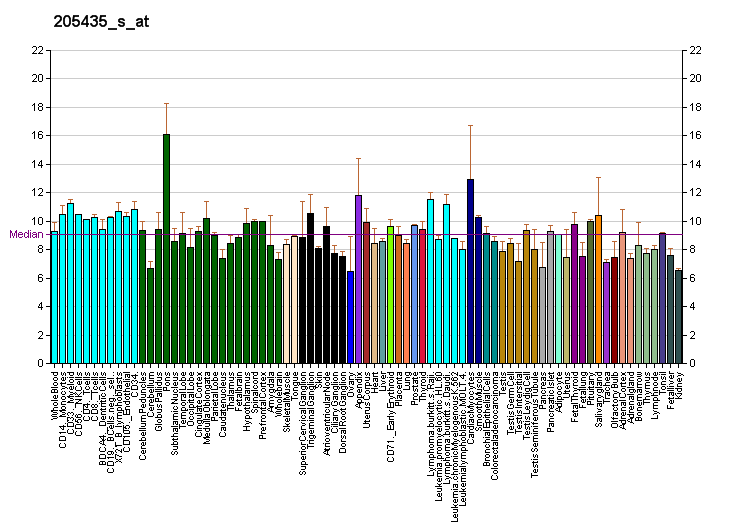

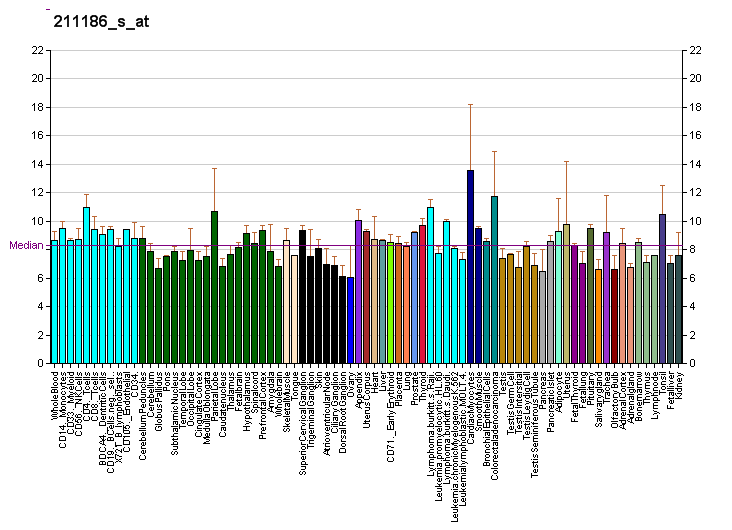
RNA expression pattern
Bgee	Human / Mouse (ortholog); Top expressed in: lateral nuclear group of thalamus; renal medulla; pons; superior vestibular nucleus; ventral tegmental area; cardia; Brodmann area 23; pylorus; inferior ganglion of vagus nerve; parietal lobe / Top expressed in: vestibular membrane of cochlear duct; substantia nigra; Paneth cell; transitional epithelium of urinary bladder; ciliary body; subiculum; retinal pigment epithelium; pontine nuclei; dentate gyrus of hippocampal formation granule cell; medial dorsal nucleus; More reference expression data
BioGPS	More reference expression data
Gene ontology
Molecular function	transferase activity; AP-2 adaptor complex binding; nucleotide binding; protein kinase activity; Notch binding; kinase activity; protein binding; ATP binding; protein serine/threonine kinase activity
Cellular component	membrane; plasma membrane; terminal bouton; cell leading edge; clathrin-coated pit; extrinsic component of plasma membrane; clathrin-coated vesicle; cytoplasm; cytosol; nucleus
Biological process	endocytosis; phosphorylation; protein stabilization; regulation of protein localization; protein autophosphorylation; positive regulation of Notch signaling pathway; protein phosphorylation; regulation of clathrin-dependent endocytosis; membrane organization; regulation of endocytosis
Sources:Amigo / QuickGO
Orthologs
Databases	NCBI: entry; OMA: entry
Species	Human	Mouse
Entrez	22848	269774
Ensembl	ENSG00000115977	ENSMUSG00000057230
UniProt	Q2M2I8	Q3UHJ0
RefSeq (mRNA)	NM_014911; NM_001371575; NM_001371577	NM_001040106; NM_177762
RefSeq (protein)	NP_055726; NP_001358504; NP_001358506	NP_001035195; NP_808430; NP_001365581; NP_001365583; NP_001365584
Location (UCSC)	Chr 2: 69.46 – 69.67 Mb	Chr 6: 86.85 – 87 Mb
PubMed search
- Wikidata
View/Edit Human	View/Edit Mouse

Adaptor-associated protein kinase 1 also known as AP2-associated protein kinase 1 is an enzyme that in humans is encoded by the AAK1 gene and is involved in clathrin mediated endocytosis. Alternatively spliced transcript variants have been described, but their biological validity has not been determined.

== Function ==
Adaptor-related protein complex 2 (AP-2 complexes) functions during receptor-mediated endocytosis to trigger clathrin assembly, interact with membrane-bound receptors, and recruit endocytic accessory factors. This gene encodes a member of the SNF1 subfamily of Ser/Thr protein kinases. The protein interacts with and phosphorylates a subunit of the AP-2 complex, which promotes binding of AP-2 to sorting signals found in membrane-bound receptors and subsequent receptor endocytosis. Its kinase activity is stimulated by clathrin.
