= STK39 =

Protein-coding gene in the species Homo sapiens

Identifiers
- Aliases: STK39, DCHT, PASK, SPAK, serine/threonine kinase 39
- External IDs: OMIM: 607648; MGI: 1858416; GeneCards: STK39
Enzyme activity
EC #	BRENDA	ExPASy	KEGG	MetaCyc
2.7.11.1	↗	↗	↗	↗

Gene location (Human)
Chr.	Chromosome 2 (human)
Band	2q24.3	Start	167,954,020 bp
Band	2q24.3	End	168,247,595 bp

Gene location (Mouse)
Chr.	Chromosome 2 (mouse)
Band	2|2 C1.3	Start	68,040,789 bp
Band	2|2 C1.3	End	68,302,612 bp
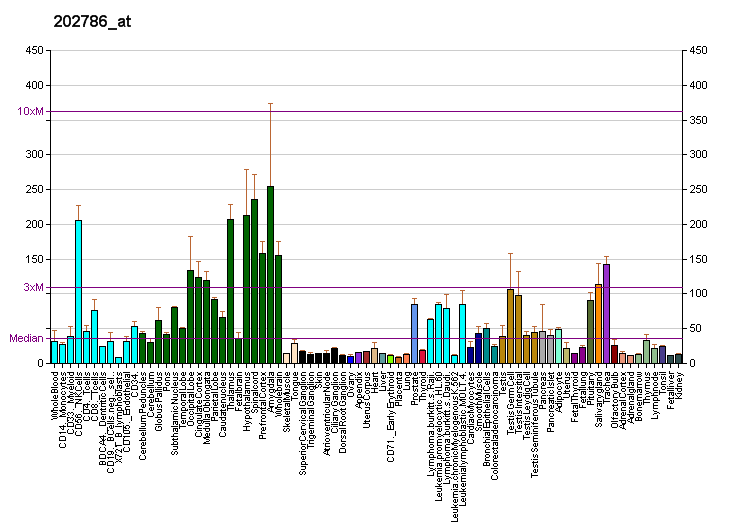
RNA expression pattern
Bgee	Human / Mouse (ortholog); Top expressed in: endothelial cell; Epithelium of choroid plexus; pons; parotid gland; palpebral conjunctiva; pars compacta; lateral nuclear group of thalamus; pars reticulata; inferior ganglion of vagus nerve; tibia / Top expressed in: Epithelium of choroid plexus; spermatocyte; choroid plexus of fourth ventricle; spermatid; seminiferous tubule; tail of embryo; salivary gland; submandibular gland; granulocyte; lacrimal gland; More reference expression data
BioGPS	More reference expression data
Gene ontology
Molecular function	transferase activity; nucleotide binding; protein kinase activity; protein binding; ATP binding; protein serine/threonine kinase activity; kinase activity; protein kinase binding
Cellular component	membrane; basolateral plasma membrane; apical plasma membrane; cytoskeleton; nucleoplasm; extrinsic component of membrane; intracellular membrane-bounded organelle; nucleus; cytoplasm; cytosol
Biological process	negative regulation of protein phosphorylation; intracellular signal transduction; signal transduction; phosphorylation; positive regulation of potassium ion transport; cellular hypotonic response; regulation of blood pressure; negative regulation of potassium ion transmembrane transporter activity; regulation of inflammatory response; negative regulation of potassium ion transmembrane transport; negative regulation of pancreatic juice secretion; peptidyl-threonine phosphorylation; positive regulation of ion transmembrane transporter activity; maintenance of lens transparency; negative regulation of creatine transmembrane transporter activity; negative regulation of sodium ion transmembrane transporter activity; regulation of mitotic cell cycle; stress-activated protein kinase signaling cascade; activation of protein kinase activity; regulation of apoptotic process; protein phosphorylation; peptidyl-serine phosphorylation; protein autophosphorylation; ion homeostasis; positive regulation of T cell chemotaxis; chemokine (C-X-C motif) ligand 12 signaling pathway; cellular response to chemokine
Sources:Amigo / QuickGO
Orthologs
Databases	NCBI: entry; OMA: entry
Species	Human	Mouse
Entrez	27347	53416
Ensembl	ENSG00000198648	ENSMUSG00000027030
UniProt	Q9UEW8	Q9Z1W9
RefSeq (mRNA)	NM_013233	NM_016866
RefSeq (protein)	NP_037365	NP_058562
Location (UCSC)	Chr 2: 167.95 – 168.25 Mb	Chr 2: 68.04 – 68.3 Mb
PubMed search
- Wikidata
View/Edit Human	View/Edit Mouse

STE20/SPS1-related proline-alanine-rich protein kinase is an enzyme that in humans is encoded by the STK39 gene.

This gene encodes a serine/threonine kinase that is thought to function in the cellular stress response pathway. The kinase is activated in response to hypotonic stress, leading to phosphorylation of several cation-chloride-coupled cotransporters. The catalytically active kinase specifically activates the p38 MAP kinase pathway, and its interaction with p38 decreases upon cellular stress, suggesting that this kinase may serve as an intermediate in the response to cellular stress. Some studies suggest that this gene might be linked to high blood pressure.
