= Cyclin-dependent kinase 18 =

Enzyme found in humans

CDK18

Identifiers
- Aliases: CDK18, PCTAIRE, PCTAIRE3, PCTK3, cyclin-dependent kinase 18, cyclin dependent kinase 18
- External IDs: OMIM: 169190; MGI: 97518; GeneCards: CDK18
Enzyme activity
EC #	BRENDA	ExPASy	KEGG	MetaCyc
2.7.11.22	↗	↗	↗	↗

Gene location (Human)
Chr.	Chromosome 1 (human)
Band	1q32.1	Start	205,504,596 bp
Band	1q32.1	End	205,532,793 bp

Gene location (Mouse)
Chr.	Chromosome 1 (mouse)
Band	1|1 E4	Start	132,039,975 bp
Band	1|1 E4	End	132,067,422 bp
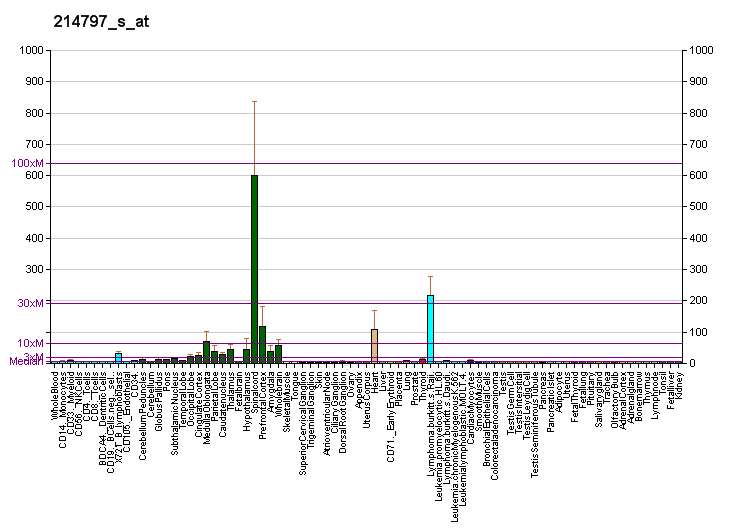
RNA expression pattern
Bgee	Human / Mouse (ortholog); Top expressed in: C1 segment; inferior ganglion of vagus nerve; apex of heart; middle frontal gyrus; subthalamic nucleus; right auricle of heart; corpus callosum; pars reticulata; left ventricle; ventral tegmental area / Top expressed in: duodenum; molar; right kidney; jejunum; pontine nuclei; lumbar subsegment of spinal cord; epithelium of stomach; transitional epithelium of urinary bladder; intestinal villus; dorsomedial hypothalamic nucleus; More reference expression data
BioGPS	More reference expression data
Gene ontology
Molecular function	transferase activity; nucleotide binding; protein kinase activity; protein binding; ATP binding; kinase activity; cyclin-dependent protein serine/threonine kinase activity; protein serine/threonine kinase activity
Cellular component	nucleus; cytoplasm; cellular component
Biological process	phosphorylation; protein phosphorylation; regulation of cell cycle
Sources:Amigo / QuickGO
Orthologs
Databases	NCBI: entry; OMA: entry
Species	Human	Mouse
Entrez	5129	18557
Ensembl	ENSG00000117266	ENSMUSG00000026437
UniProt	Q07002	Q04899
RefSeq (mRNA)	NM_002596; NM_212502; NM_212503	NM_008795
RefSeq (protein)	NP_002587; NP_997667; NP_997668	NP_032821
Location (UCSC)	Chr 1: 205.5 – 205.53 Mb	Chr 1: 132.04 – 132.07 Mb
PubMed search
- Wikidata
View/Edit Human	View/Edit Mouse

Cyclin-dependent kinase 18 is an enzyme that in humans is encoded by the CDK18 gene (previously PCTK3).
