= RPS6KA6 =

Protein found in humans

Identifiers
- Aliases: RPS6KA6, PP90RSK4, RSK4, ribosomal protein S6 kinase A6, RSK-4, p90RSK6, S6K-alpha-6
- External IDs: OMIM: 300303; MGI: 1914321; GeneCards: RPS6KA6
Enzyme activity
EC #	BRENDA	ExPASy	KEGG	MetaCyc
2.7.11.1	↗	↗	↗	↗

Gene location (Human)
Chr.	X chromosome (human)
Band	Xq21.1	Start	84,058,346 bp
Band	Xq21.1	End	84,206,356 bp

Gene location (Mouse)
Chr.	X chromosome (mouse)
Band	X|X E1	Start	110,297,889 bp
Band	X|X E1	End	110,447,656 bp
RNA expression pattern
Bgee	Human / Mouse (ortholog); Top expressed in: secondary oocyte; tibia; islet of Langerhans; ganglionic eminence; middle temporal gyrus; pituitary gland; popliteal artery; anterior pituitary; thyroid gland; seminal vesicula / Top expressed in: tail of embryo; genital tubercle; yolk sac; ventricular zone; primitive streak; zygote; secondary oocyte; spermatid; epiblast; embryo; More reference expression data
BioGPS	n/a
Gene ontology
Molecular function	transferase activity; nucleotide binding; metal ion binding; ATP binding; magnesium ion binding; protein serine/threonine kinase activity; kinase activity; protein kinase activity; ribosomal protein S6 kinase activity
Cellular component	cytoplasm; nucleolus; mitochondrion; nucleus; cytosol; fibrillar center; nucleoplasm
Biological process	intracellular signal transduction; phosphorylation; protein phosphorylation; negative regulation of embryonic development; central nervous system development; negative regulation of mesoderm development; negative regulation of ERK1 and ERK2 cascade; signal transduction; DNA damage response, signal transduction by p53 class mediator resulting in transcription of p21 class mediator
Sources:Amigo / QuickGO
Orthologs
Databases	NCBI: entry
Species	Human	Mouse
Entrez	27330	67071
Ensembl	n/a	ENSMUSG00000025665
UniProt	Q9UK32	Q7TPS0
RefSeq (mRNA)	NM_014496; NM_001330512	NM_025949; NM_001374707; NM_001398774
RefSeq (protein)	NP_001317441; NP_055311	NP_080225; NP_001361636; NP_001385703
Location (UCSC)	Chr X: 84.06 – 84.21 Mb	Chr X: 110.3 – 110.45 Mb
PubMed search
- Wikidata
View/Edit Human	View/Edit Mouse

Ribosomal protein S6 kinase, 90kDa, polypeptide 6 is a protein in humans that is encoded by the RPS6KA6 gene.

This gene encodes a member of ribosomal S6 kinase family, serine-threonin protein kinases which are regulated by growth factors. The encoded protein may be distinct from other members of this family, however, as studies suggest it is not growth factor dependent and may not participate in the same signaling pathways. [provided by RefSeq, Jan 2010].
