= STK17A =

Protein-coding gene in the species Homo sapiens

Identifiers
- Aliases: STK17A, DRAK1, serine/threonine kinase 17a
- External IDs: OMIM: 604726; GeneCards: STK17A
Enzyme activity
EC #	BRENDA	ExPASy	KEGG	MetaCyc
2.7.11.1	↗	↗	↗	↗

Gene location (Human)
Chr.	Chromosome 7 (human)
Band	7p13	Start	43,582,758 bp
Band	7p13	End	43,650,713 bp
RNA expression pattern
Bgee	Human / Mouse (ortholog); Top expressed in: lymph node; epithelium of nasopharynx; granulocyte; appendix; blood; bone marrow; ganglionic eminence; ventricular zone; vena cava; Achilles tendon / n/a; More reference expression data
BioGPS	n/a
Gene ontology
Molecular function	kinase activity; transferase activity; nucleotide binding; protein kinase activity; protein serine/threonine kinase activity; ATP binding
Cellular component	nucleus; plasma membrane; nuclear speck
Biological process	positive regulation of apoptotic process; positive regulation of fibroblast apoptotic process; protein phosphorylation; intracellular signal transduction; regulation of reactive oxygen species metabolic process; phosphorylation; apoptotic process
Sources:Amigo / QuickGO
Orthologs
Databases	NCBI: entry; OMA: entry
Species	Human	Mouse
Entrez	9263	n/a
Ensembl	ENSG00000164543	n/a
UniProt	Q9UEE5	n/a
RefSeq (mRNA)	NM_004760	n/a
RefSeq (protein)	NP_004751	n/a
Location (UCSC)	Chr 7: 43.58 – 43.65 Mb	n/a
PubMed search		n/a
- Wikidata
View/Edit Human

Serine/threonine kinase 17a is a protein that in humans is encoded by the STK17A gene.

== Function ==
This gene is a member of the death-associated protein (DAP) kinase-related apoptosis-inducing protein kinase family and encodes an autophosphorylated nuclear protein with a protein kinase domain. The protein has apoptosis-inducing activity.

In a recent study the gene (among others) shows a major role in centenarians longer lifespan.
