= TSSK2 =

Protein-coding gene in the species Homo sapiens

Identifiers
- Aliases: TSSK2, DGS-G, SPOGA2, STK22B, TSK2, testis specific serine kinase 2
- External IDs: OMIM: 610710; MGI: 1347559; GeneCards: TSSK2
Enzyme activity
EC #	BRENDA	ExPASy	KEGG	MetaCyc
2.7.11.1	↗	↗	↗	↗

Gene location (Human)
Chr.	Chromosome 22 (human)
Band	22q11.21	Start	19,131,308 bp
Band	22q11.21	End	19,132,622 bp

Gene location (Mouse)
Chr.	Chromosome 16 (mouse)
Band	16 A3|16 11.09 cM	Start	17,716,501 bp
Band	16 A3|16 11.09 cM	End	17,717,888 bp
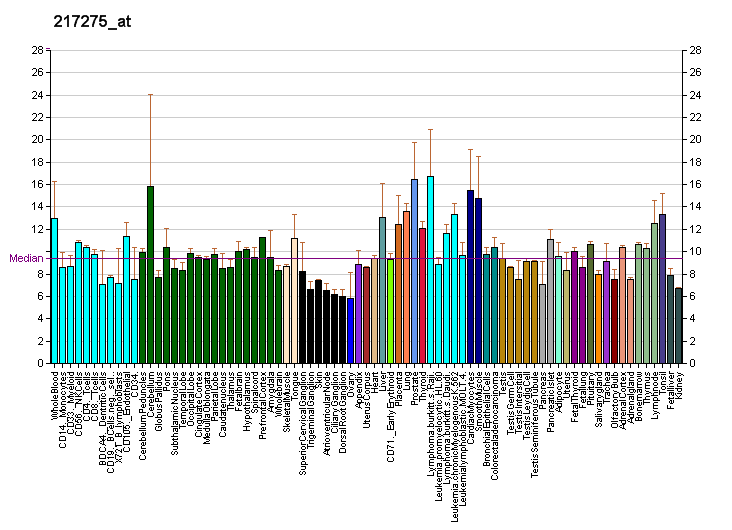

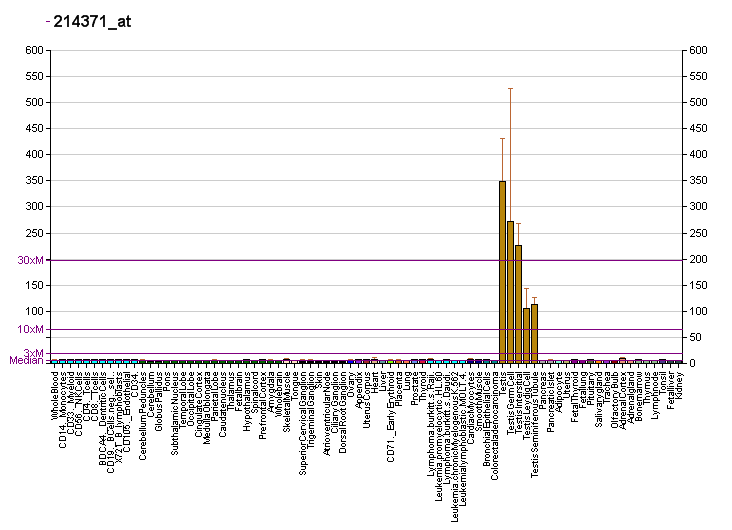
RNA expression pattern
Bgee	Human / Mouse (ortholog); Top expressed in: left testis; right testis; testicle; sperm; gonad; tibialis anterior muscle; ganglionic eminence; tail of epididymis; deltoid muscle; ventricular zone / Top expressed in: spermatid; testicle; spermatocyte; liver; embryo; secondary oocyte; islet of Langerhans; skeletal muscle tissue; urinary bladder; bone marrow; More reference expression data
BioGPS	More reference expression data
Gene ontology
Molecular function	transferase activity; nucleotide binding; protein kinase activity; metal ion binding; kinase activity; protein serine/threonine kinase activity; protein binding; ATP binding; magnesium ion binding; protein-containing complex binding
Cellular component	cytoplasm; acrosomal vesicle; centriole; cytoskeleton; nucleus
Biological process	cell differentiation; intracellular signal transduction; phosphorylation; multicellular organism development; protein phosphorylation; spermatogenesis; spermatid development; protein autophosphorylation; peptidyl-serine phosphorylation
Sources:Amigo / QuickGO
Orthologs
Databases	NCBI: entry; OMA: entry
Species	Human	Mouse
Entrez	23617	22115
Ensembl	ENSG00000206203	ENSMUSG00000045521
UniProt	Q96PF2	O54863
RefSeq (mRNA)	NM_053006	NM_009436
RefSeq (protein)	NP_443732	NP_033462
Location (UCSC)	Chr 22: 19.13 – 19.13 Mb	Chr 16: 17.72 – 17.72 Mb
PubMed search
- Wikidata
View/Edit Human	View/Edit Mouse

Testis-specific serine/threonine-protein kinase 2 is an enzyme that in humans is encoded by the TSSK2 gene.
