= TAOK3 =

Protein-coding gene in the species Homo sapiens

Identifiers
- Aliases: TAOK3, DPK, JIK, MAP3K18, TAO kinase 3, hKFC-A
- External IDs: OMIM: 616711; MGI: 3041177; GeneCards: TAOK3
Enzyme activity
EC #	BRENDA	ExPASy	KEGG	MetaCyc
2.7.11.1	↗	↗	↗	↗

Gene location (Human)
Chr.	Chromosome 12 (human)
Band	12q24.23	Start	118,149,801 bp
Band	12q24.23	End	118,372,907 bp

Gene location (Mouse)
Chr.	Chromosome 5 (mouse)
Band	5|5 F	Start	117,258,194 bp
Band	5|5 F	End	117,413,284 bp
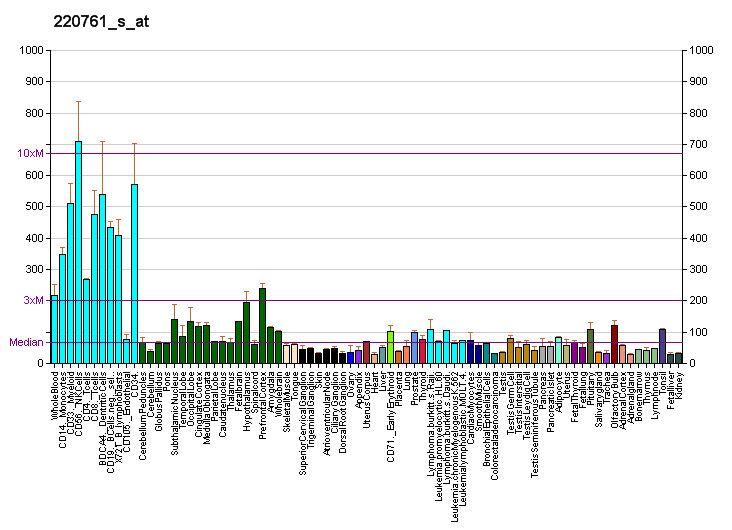
RNA expression pattern
Bgee	Human / Mouse (ortholog); Top expressed in: secondary oocyte; monocyte; jejunal mucosa; epithelium of colon; bone marrow cell; superior vestibular nucleus; middle temporal gyrus; external globus pallidus; internal globus pallidus; corpus callosum / Top expressed in: Rostral migratory stream; crypt of lieberkuhn of small intestine; ventromedial nucleus; supraoptic nucleus; conjunctival fornix; neural layer of retina; epithelium of stomach; lateral septal nucleus; mammillary body; retinal pigment epithelium; More reference expression data
BioGPS	More reference expression data
Gene ontology
Molecular function	transferase activity; nucleotide binding; protein kinase activity; protein kinase inhibitor activity; kinase activity; protein serine/threonine kinase activity; protein binding; ATP binding; MAP kinase kinase kinase activity
Cellular component	cytoplasm; membrane; plasma membrane; nucleus
Biological process	phosphorylation; positive regulation of JUN kinase activity; positive regulation of JNK cascade; MAPK cascade; cellular response to DNA damage stimulus; negative regulation of JNK cascade; protein phosphorylation; protein autophosphorylation; mitotic G2 DNA damage checkpoint signaling; DNA repair; positive regulation of stress-activated MAPK cascade; negative regulation of protein kinase activity; nervous system development; regulation of apoptotic process; signal transduction; stress-activated protein kinase signaling cascade; activation of protein kinase activity
Sources:Amigo / QuickGO
Orthologs
Databases	NCBI: entry; OMA: entry
Species	Human	Mouse
Entrez	51347	330177
Ensembl	ENSG00000135090	ENSMUSG00000061288
UniProt	Q9H2K8	Q8BYC6
RefSeq (mRNA)	NM_001346487; NM_001346488; NM_001346489; NM_001346490; NM_001346491 NM_001346492; NM_001346493; NM_001346494; NM_001346495; NM_001346496; NM_001346497; NM_016281	NM_001081308; NM_001199685; NM_183306
RefSeq (protein)	NP_001333416; NP_001333417; NP_001333418; NP_001333419; NP_001333420 NP_001333421; NP_001333422; NP_001333423; NP_001333424; NP_001333425; NP_001333426; NP_057365	NP_001074777; NP_001186614; NP_899129
Location (UCSC)	Chr 12: 118.15 – 118.37 Mb	Chr 5: 117.26 – 117.41 Mb
PubMed search
- Wikidata
View/Edit Human	View/Edit Mouse

Serine/threonine-protein kinase TAO3 is an enzyme that in humans is encoded by the TAOK3 gene.
