= NRBP1 =

Protein-coding gene in the species Homo sapiens

Identifiers
- Aliases: NRBP1, BCON3, MADM, MUDPNP, NRBP, nuclear receptor binding protein 1
- External IDs: OMIM: 606010; MGI: 2183436; GeneCards: NRBP1

Gene location (Human)
Chr.	Chromosome 2 (human)
Band	2p23.3	Start	27,427,790 bp
Band	2p23.3	End	27,442,259 bp

Gene location (Mouse)
Chr.	Chromosome 5 (mouse)
Band	5|5 B1	Start	31,398,208 bp
Band	5|5 B1	End	31,408,910 bp
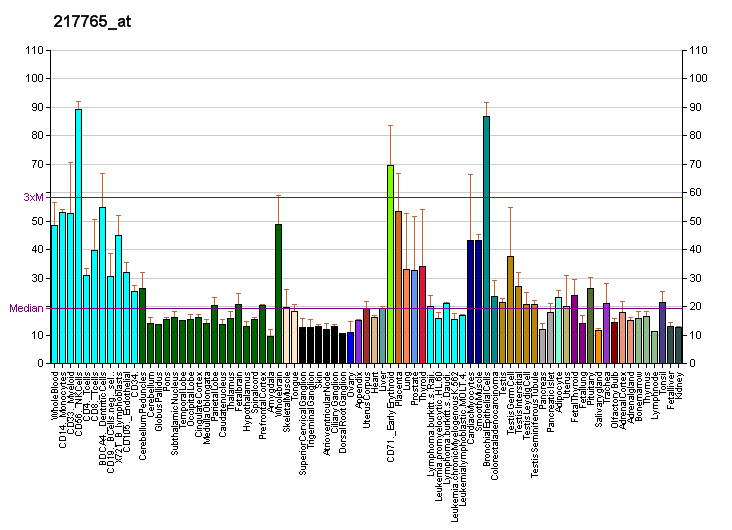
RNA expression pattern
Bgee	Human / Mouse (ortholog); Top expressed in: right testis; gastric mucosa; left testis; body of uterus; ectocervix; canal of the cervix; stromal cell of endometrium; granulocyte; muscle layer of sigmoid colon; right ovary / Top expressed in: tail of embryo; genital tubercle; neural layer of retina; granulocyte; ventricular zone; dentate gyrus of hippocampal formation granule cell; lip; muscle of thigh; primary visual cortex; superior frontal gyrus; More reference expression data
BioGPS	More reference expression data
Gene ontology
Molecular function	protein kinase activity; protein binding; ATP binding; protein serine/threonine kinase activity; protein homodimerization activity
Cellular component	cytoplasm; cell projection; cell cortex; membrane; endomembrane system; lamellipodium; nucleoplasm; cytosol
Biological process	endoplasmic reticulum to Golgi vesicle-mediated transport; transcription initiation from RNA polymerase II promoter; intracellular signal transduction; protein phosphorylation
Sources:Amigo / QuickGO
Orthologs
Databases	NCBI: entry; OMA: entry
Species	Human	Mouse
Entrez	29959	192292
Ensembl	ENSG00000115216	ENSMUSG00000029148
UniProt	Q9UHY1	Q99J45
RefSeq (mRNA)	NM_013392; NM_001321357; NM_001321358; NM_001321359; NM_001321361 NM_001321362; NM_001321363	NM_147201; NM_001347326
RefSeq (protein)	NP_001308286; NP_001308287; NP_001308288; NP_001308290; NP_001308291 NP_001308292; NP_037524	NP_001334255; NP_671734
Location (UCSC)	Chr 2: 27.43 – 27.44 Mb	Chr 5: 31.4 – 31.41 Mb
PubMed search
- Wikidata
View/Edit Human	View/Edit Mouse

Nuclear receptor-binding protein is a protein that in humans is encoded by the NRBP1 gene.
