= MAP3K9 =

Protein-coding gene in the species Homo sapiens

Identifiers
- Aliases: MAP3K9, MEKK9, MLK1, PRKE1, mitogen-activated protein kinase kinase kinase 9
- External IDs: OMIM: 600136; MGI: 2449952; GeneCards: MAP3K9
Available structures
PDB	Ortholog search: PDBe RCSB
PDB	List of PDB id codes 3DTC, 4UY9
Enzyme activity
EC #	BRENDA	ExPASy	KEGG	MetaCyc
2.7.11.25	↗	↗	↗	↗

Gene location (Human)
Chr.	Chromosome 14 (human)
Band	14q24.2	Start	70,722,526 bp
Band	14q24.2	End	70,809,534 bp

Gene location (Mouse)
Chr.	Chromosome 12 (mouse)
Band	12|12 D1	Start	81,767,784 bp
Band	12|12 D1	End	81,827,949 bp
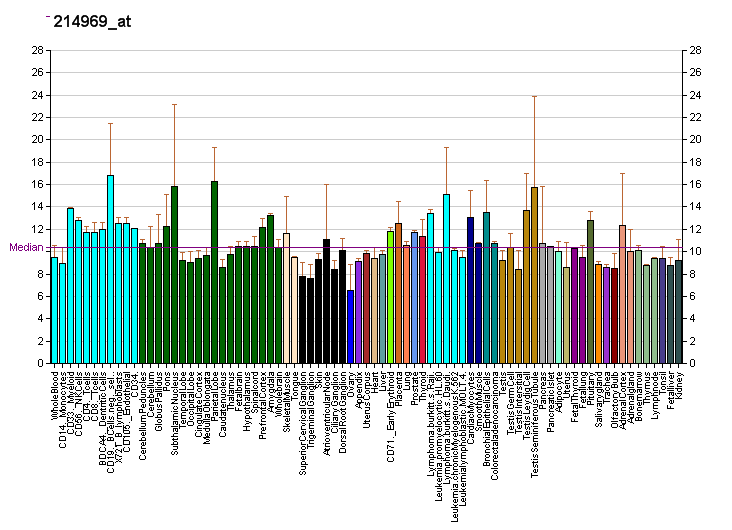
RNA expression pattern
Bgee	Human / Mouse (ortholog); Top expressed in: buccal mucosa cell; lateral nuclear group of thalamus; cerebellar vermis; pars compacta; frontal pole; postcentral gyrus; amniotic fluid; pars reticulata; orbitofrontal cortex; middle temporal gyrus / Top expressed in: granulocyte; primary visual cortex; superior frontal gyrus; lip; dentate gyrus of hippocampal formation granule cell; esophagus; zygote; cerebellar cortex; neural layer of retina; ventricular zone; More reference expression data
BioGPS	More reference expression data
Gene ontology
Molecular function	transferase activity; nucleotide binding; protein kinase activity; protein homodimerization activity; kinase activity; protein serine/threonine kinase activity; protein binding; ATP binding; MAP kinase kinase kinase activity; MAP kinase kinase activity; JUN kinase kinase kinase activity
Cellular component	cytoplasm; cellular component; intracellular anatomical structure
Biological process	regulation of transcription, DNA-templated; phosphorylation; cell death; transcription, DNA-templated; protein phosphorylation; positive regulation of apoptotic process; protein autophosphorylation; apoptotic process; MAPK cascade
Sources:Amigo / QuickGO
Orthologs
Databases	NCBI: entry; OMA: entry
Species	Human	Mouse
Entrez	4293	338372
Ensembl	ENSG00000006432	ENSMUSG00000042724
UniProt	P80192	Q3U1V8
RefSeq (mRNA)	NM_001284230; NM_001284231; NM_001284232; NM_033141	NM_001174107; NM_177395
RefSeq (protein)	NP_001271159; NP_001271160; NP_001271161; NP_149132	NP_001167578; NP_796369
Location (UCSC)	Chr 14: 70.72 – 70.81 Mb	Chr 12: 81.77 – 81.83 Mb
PubMed search
- Wikidata
View/Edit Human	View/Edit Mouse

Mitogen-activated protein kinase kinase kinase 9 is an enzyme that in humans is encoded by the MAP3K9 gene.
