= CDKL2 =

Protein-coding gene in humans

Available structures
PDB	Ortholog search: PDBe RCSB
PDB	List of PDB id codes 4AAA, 4BBM

Identifiers
- Aliases: CDKL2, KKIAMRE, P56, cyclin dependent kinase like 2
- External IDs: OMIM: 603442; MGI: 1858227; HomoloGene: 55793; GeneCards: CDKL2; OMA:CDKL2 - orthologs

Gene location (Human)
Chr.	Chromosome 4 (human)
Band	4q21.1	Start	75,576,496 bp
Band	4q21.1	End	75,630,716 bp

Gene location (Mouse)
Chr.	Chromosome 5 (mouse)
Band	5|5 E2	Start	92,006,074 bp
Band	5|5 E2	End	92,043,883 bp
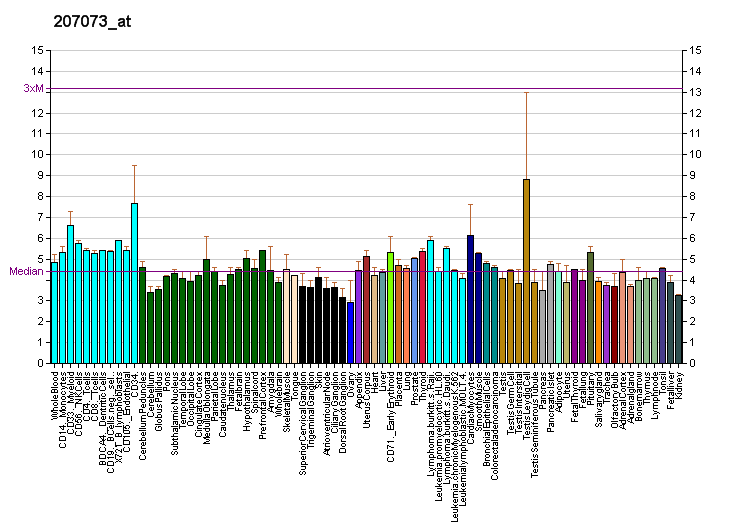
RNA expression pattern
Bgee	Human / Mouse (ortholog); Top expressed in: endothelial cell; Brodmann area 23; middle temporal gyrus; postcentral gyrus; superior frontal gyrus; testicle; primary visual cortex; entorhinal cortex; lower lobe of lung; prefrontal cortex / Top expressed in: barrel cortex; lumbar spinal ganglion; spermatocyte; facial motor nucleus; seminiferous tubule; olfactory epithelium; spermatid; vestibular sensory epithelium; zygote; Epithelium of choroid plexus; More reference expression data
BioGPS	More reference expression data
Gene ontology
Molecular function	transferase activity; protein kinase activity; nucleotide binding; protein serine/threonine kinase activity; ATP binding; kinase activity; cyclin-dependent protein serine/threonine kinase activity
Cellular component	cytoplasm; centrosome; nucleus
Biological process	protein phosphorylation; sex differentiation; phosphorylation; signal transduction; regulation of cell cycle
Sources:Amigo / QuickGO
Orthologs
Species	Human	Mouse
Entrez	8999	53886
Ensembl	ENSG00000138769	ENSMUSG00000029403
UniProt	Q92772	Q9QUK0
RefSeq (mRNA)	NM_003948; NM_001330724	NM_001276315; NM_016912; NM_177270
RefSeq (protein)	NP_001317653; NP_003939	NP_001263244; NP_058608; NP_796244
Location (UCSC)	Chr 4: 75.58 – 75.63 Mb	Chr 5: 92.01 – 92.04 Mb
PubMed search
- Wikidata
View/Edit Human	View/Edit Mouse

Cyclin-dependent kinase-like 2 is an enzyme that in humans is encoded by the CDKL2 gene.

This gene product is a member of a large family of CDC2-related serine/threonine protein kinases. It accumulates primarily in the cytoplasm, with lower levels in the nucleus.
