= STK40 =

Protein-coding gene in humans

Identifiers
- Aliases: STK40, SHIK, SgK495, serine/threonine kinase 40
- External IDs: OMIM: 609437; MGI: 1921428; GeneCards: STK40
Enzyme activity
EC #	BRENDA	ExPASy	KEGG	MetaCyc
2.7.11.1	↗	↗	↗	↗

Gene location (Human)
Chr.	Chromosome 1 (human)
Band	1p34.3	Start	36,339,624 bp
Band	1p34.3	End	36,385,924 bp

Gene location (Mouse)
Chr.	Chromosome 4 (mouse)
Band	4|4 D2.2	Start	125,997,750 bp
Band	4|4 D2.2	End	126,034,822 bp
RNA expression pattern
Bgee	Human / Mouse (ortholog); Top expressed in: gastrocnemius muscle; blood; muscle of thigh; granulocyte; left testis; right testis; monocyte; apex of heart; right coronary artery; islet of Langerhans / Top expressed in: Ileal epithelium; lactiferous gland; muscle of thigh; granulocyte; plantaris muscle; perirhinal cortex; skeletal muscle tissue; knee joint; extensor digitorum longus muscle; entorhinal cortex; More reference expression data
BioGPS	n/a
Gene ontology
Molecular function	transferase activity; nucleotide binding; protein kinase activity; protein serine/threonine kinase activity; protein binding; ATP binding; kinase activity
Cellular component	nucleus; nucleoplasm; cytoplasm; cytosol
Biological process	glycogen metabolic process; regulation of gene expression; protein phosphorylation; lung alveolus development; respiratory system process; negative regulation of apoptotic process; regulation of MAPK cascade; lung morphogenesis; phosphorylation; multicellular organism growth; lung development
Sources:Amigo / QuickGO
Orthologs
Databases	NCBI: entry; OMA: entry
Species	Human	Mouse
Entrez	83931	74178
Ensembl	ENSG00000196182	ENSMUSG00000042608
UniProt	Q8N2I9	Q7TNL3
RefSeq (mRNA)	NM_032017; NM_001282546; NM_001282547	NM_001145827; NM_028800
RefSeq (protein)	NP_001269475; NP_001269476; NP_114406	NP_001139299; NP_083076
Location (UCSC)	Chr 1: 36.34 – 36.39 Mb	Chr 4: 126 – 126.03 Mb
PubMed search
- Wikidata
View/Edit Human	View/Edit Mouse

Serine/threonine-protein kinase 40 is an enzyme that in humans is encoded by the STK40 gene.
