= SCYL2 =

Protein-coding gene in humans

Identifiers
- Aliases: SCYL2, CVAK104, SCY1 like pseudokinase 2, AMCNACC, AMC4
- External IDs: OMIM: 616365; MGI: 1289172; GeneCards: SCYL2

Gene location (Human)
Chr.	Chromosome 12 (human)
Band	12q23.1	Start	100,267,140 bp
Band	12q23.1	End	100,341,715 bp

Gene location (Mouse)
Chr.	Chromosome 10 (mouse)
Band	10 C2|10 45.05 cM	Start	89,474,583 bp
Band	10 C2|10 45.05 cM	End	89,522,147 bp
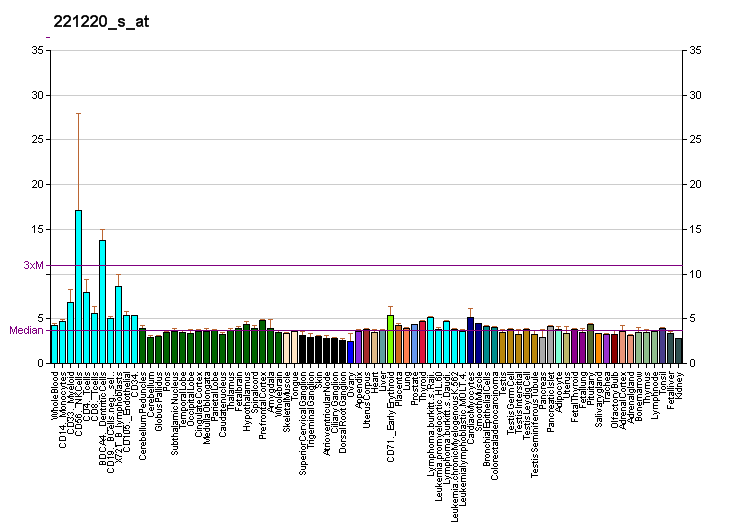
RNA expression pattern
Bgee	Human / Mouse (ortholog); Top expressed in: mucosa of sigmoid colon; corpus epididymis; secondary oocyte; jejunal mucosa; palpebral conjunctiva; amniotic fluid; oral cavity; rectum; tail of epididymis; monocyte / Top expressed in: secondary oocyte; zygote; hand; primary oocyte; lumbar spinal ganglion; tail of embryo; superior cervical ganglion; granulocyte; genital tubercle; endocardial cushion; More reference expression data
BioGPS	More reference expression data
Gene ontology
Molecular function	ATP binding; signaling receptor binding; protein kinase activity; protein binding
Cellular component	Golgi apparatus; endosome membrane; membrane; cytoplasmic vesicle; clathrin-coated vesicle; cytoplasm; endosome; perinuclear region of cytoplasm
Biological process	receptor internalization involved in canonical Wnt signaling pathway; negative regulation of canonical Wnt signaling pathway; protein phosphorylation; endosome to lysosome transport; positive regulation of clathrin-dependent endocytosis; positive regulation of receptor internalization
Sources:Amigo / QuickGO
Orthologs
Databases	NCBI: entry; OMA: entry
Species	Human	Mouse
Entrez	55681	213326
Ensembl	ENSG00000136021	ENSMUSG00000069539
UniProt	Q6P3W7	Q8CFE4
RefSeq (mRNA)	NM_017988; NM_001317784; NM_001330253; NM_001330254; NM_001330256	NM_198021; NM_001310704; NM_001358843
RefSeq (protein)	NP_001304713; NP_001317182; NP_001317183; NP_001317185; NP_060458	NP_001297633; NP_932138; NP_001345772
Location (UCSC)	Chr 12: 100.27 – 100.34 Mb	Chr 10: 89.47 – 89.52 Mb
PubMed search
- Wikidata
View/Edit Human	View/Edit Mouse

SCY1-like protein 2 is a protein that in humans is encoded by the SCYL2 gene.
