= Cyclin-dependent kinase 17 =

Enzyme found in humans

CDK17

Identifiers
- Aliases: CDK17, PCTAIRE2, PCTK2, cyclin-dependent kinase 17, cyclin dependent kinase 17
- External IDs: OMIM: 603440; MGI: 97517; GeneCards: CDK17
Enzyme activity
EC #	BRENDA	ExPASy	KEGG	MetaCyc
2.7.11.22	↗	↗	↗	↗

Gene location (Human)
Chr.	Chromosome 12 (human)
Band	12q23.1	Start	96,278,261 bp
Band	12q23.1	End	96,400,480 bp

Gene location (Mouse)
Chr.	Chromosome 10 (mouse)
Band	10|10 C2	Start	93,160,875 bp
Band	10|10 C2	End	93,267,071 bp
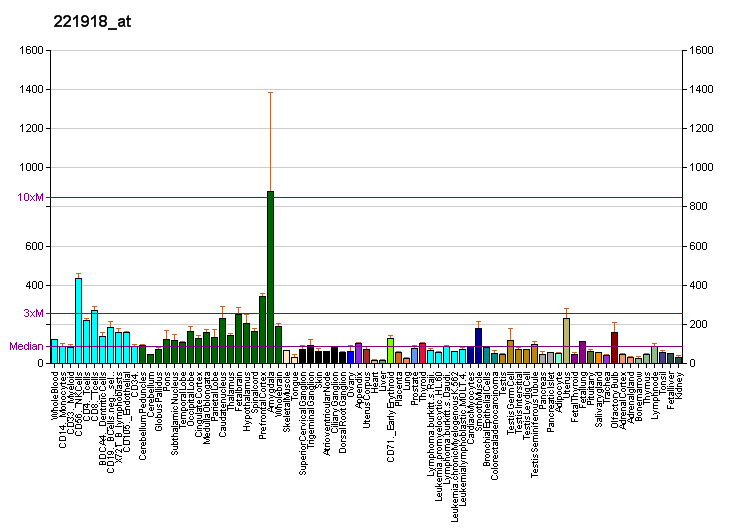

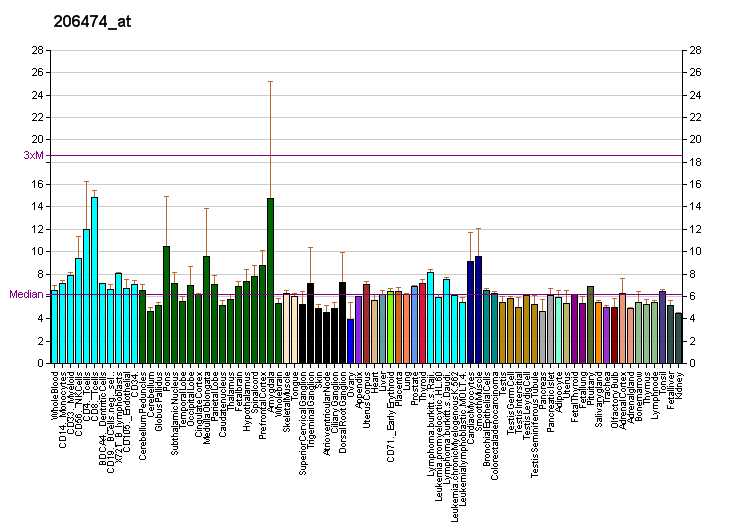
RNA expression pattern
Bgee	Human / Mouse (ortholog); Top expressed in: corpus callosum; Region I of hippocampus proper; Brodmann area 23; external globus pallidus; Achilles tendon; visceral pleura; postcentral gyrus; vena cava; superior frontal gyrus; middle temporal gyrus / Top expressed in: olfactory tubercle; Region I of hippocampus proper; piriform cortex; nucleus accumbens; subiculum; primary motor cortex; temporal lobe; amygdala; prefrontal cortex; anterior amygdaloid area; More reference expression data
BioGPS	More reference expression data
Gene ontology
Molecular function	transferase activity; protein kinase activity; nucleotide binding; protein binding; ATP binding; kinase activity; cyclin-dependent protein serine/threonine kinase activity; protein serine/threonine kinase activity
Cellular component	nucleus; cytoplasm
Biological process	protein phosphorylation; phosphorylation; regulation of cell cycle
Sources:Amigo / QuickGO
Orthologs
Databases	NCBI: entry; OMA: entry
Species	Human	Mouse
Entrez	5128	237459
Ensembl	ENSG00000059758	ENSMUSG00000020015
UniProt	Q00537	Q8K0D0
RefSeq (mRNA)	NM_001170464; NM_002595	NM_146239
RefSeq (protein)	NP_001163935; NP_002586	NP_666351
Location (UCSC)	Chr 12: 96.28 – 96.4 Mb	Chr 10: 93.16 – 93.27 Mb
PubMed search
- Wikidata
View/Edit Human	View/Edit Mouse

Cyclin-dependent kinase 17 is an enzyme that in humans is encoded by the CDK17 gene (previously PCTK2).

The protein encoded by this gene belongs to the cdc2/cdkx subfamily of the ser/thr family of protein kinases. It has similarity to rat protein which is thought to play a role in terminally differentiated neurons.
