= BRSK2 =

Protein-coding gene in the species Homo sapiens

Identifiers
- Aliases: BRSK2, C11orf7, PEN11B, SAD1, SADA, STK29, BR serine/threonine kinase 2, SAD-A
- External IDs: OMIM: 609236; MGI: 1923020; HomoloGene: 123829; GeneCards: BRSK2; OMA:BRSK2 - orthologs
- EC number: 2.7.11.26

Gene location (Human)
Chr.	Chromosome 11 (human)
Band	11p15.5	Start	1,389,899 bp
Band	11p15.5	End	1,462,689 bp

Gene location (Mouse)
Chr.	Chromosome 7 (mouse)
Band	7|7 F5	Start	141,503,488 bp
Band	7|7 F5	End	141,557,984 bp
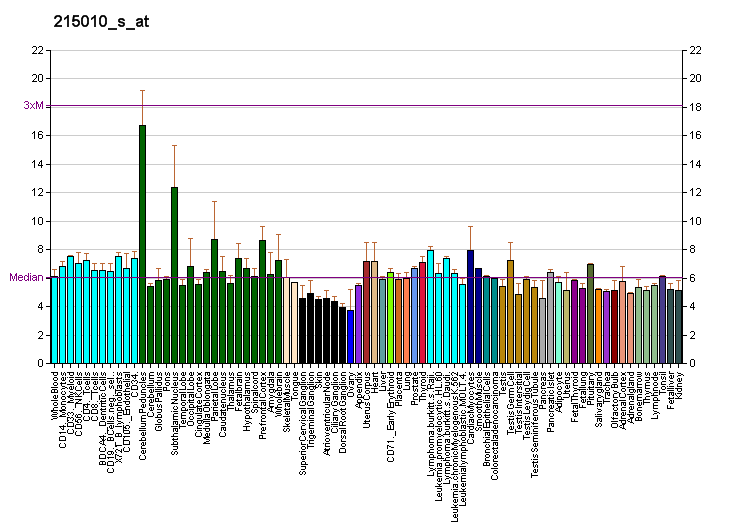
RNA expression pattern
Bgee	Human / Mouse (ortholog); Top expressed in: right hemisphere of cerebellum; body of pancreas; right frontal lobe; ganglionic eminence; anterior cingulate cortex; Brodmann area 9; prefrontal cortex; C1 segment; nucleus accumbens; amygdala / Top expressed in: visual cortex; primary visual cortex; superior frontal gyrus; dentate gyrus of hippocampal formation granule cell; neural layer of retina; cerebellar cortex; prefrontal cortex; hippocampus proper; ganglionic eminence; lumbar subsegment of spinal cord; More reference expression data
BioGPS	More reference expression data
Gene ontology
Molecular function	transferase activity; nucleotide binding; protein kinase activity; ATPase binding; ATPase regulator activity; metal ion binding; kinase activity; protein kinase binding; magnesium ion binding; tau-protein kinase activity; protein serine/threonine kinase activity; ATP binding; tau protein binding
Cellular component	centrosome; microtubule organizing center; perinuclear region of cytoplasm; cytoskeleton; nucleus; cytoplasm; endoplasmic reticulum; distal axon
Biological process	actin cytoskeleton reorganization; neuron projection morphogenesis; ERAD pathway; phosphorylation; nervous system development; cell division; intrinsic apoptotic signaling pathway in response to endoplasmic reticulum stress; G2/M transition of mitotic cell cycle; peptidyl-serine phosphorylation; cell cycle; regulation of ATP-dependent activity; regulation of retrograde protein transport, ER to cytosol; exocytosis; apoptotic process; establishment of cell polarity; regulation of insulin secretion involved in cellular response to glucose stimulus; axonogenesis; protein phosphorylation; neuron differentiation; regulation of neuron projection development; intracellular signal transduction; regulation of axonogenesis; microtubule cytoskeleton organization involved in establishment of planar polarity; regulation of synaptic vesicle clustering
Sources:Amigo / QuickGO
Orthologs
Species	Human	Mouse
Entrez	9024	75770
Ensembl	ENSG00000174672	ENSMUSG00000053046
UniProt	Q8IWQ3	Q69Z98
RefSeq (mRNA)	NM_001256627; NM_001256629; NM_001256630; NM_001282218; NM_003957	NM_001009929; NM_001009930; NM_001276763; NM_029426
RefSeq (protein)	NP_001243556; NP_001243558; NP_001243559; NP_001269147; NP_003948	NP_001009929; NP_001009930; NP_001263692; NP_083702
Location (UCSC)	Chr 11: 1.39 – 1.46 Mb	Chr 7: 141.5 – 141.56 Mb
PubMed search
- Wikidata
View/Edit Human	View/Edit Mouse

BR serine/threonine-protein kinase 2 is an enzyme that in humans is encoded by the BRSK2 gene.
