= MAP3K19 =

Protein-coding gene in the species Homo sapiens

Identifiers
- Aliases: MAP3K19, RCK, YSK4, mitogen-activated protein kinase kinase kinase 19
- External IDs: MGI: 1203481; GeneCards: MAP3K19
Enzyme activity
EC #	BRENDA	ExPASy	KEGG	MetaCyc
2.7.11.1	↗	↗	↗	↗

Gene location (Human)
Chr.	Chromosome 2 (human)
Band	2q21.3	Start	134,964,485 bp
Band	2q21.3	End	135,047,468 bp

Gene location (Mouse)
Chr.	Chromosome 1 (mouse)
Band	1|1 E3	Start	127,742,528 bp
Band	1|1 E3	End	127,782,768 bp
RNA expression pattern
Bgee	Human / Mouse (ortholog); Top expressed in: bronchial epithelial cell; right uterine tube; sperm; gonad; olfactory zone of nasal mucosa; mucosa of paranasal sinus; testicle; epithelium of nasopharynx; right testis; left testis / Top expressed in: fourth ventricle; choroid plexus of fourth ventricle; choroidal fissure; hypothalamus; floor plate; dentate gyrus of hippocampal formation granule cell; ovary; hippocampus proper; Cortex of frontal lobe; primary visual cortex; More reference expression data
BioGPS	n/a
Gene ontology
Molecular function	transferase activity; nucleotide binding; protein kinase activity; ATP binding; kinase activity; protein serine/threonine kinase activity
Cellular component	cytoplasm
Biological process	protein phosphorylation; phosphorylation; regulation of mitotic cell cycle; signal transduction; stress-activated protein kinase signaling cascade; activation of protein kinase activity; regulation of apoptotic process
Sources:Amigo / QuickGO
Orthologs
Databases	NCBI: entry; OMA: entry
Species	Human	Mouse
Entrez	80122	22625
Ensembl	ENSG00000176601	ENSMUSG00000051590
UniProt	Q56UN5	E9Q3S4
RefSeq (mRNA)	NM_001018044; NM_001018045; NM_001018046; NM_001018047; NM_001282883 NM_025052; NM_001321177; NM_001018043; NM_001400438	NM_011737
RefSeq (protein)	NP_001018054; NP_001018056; NP_001018057; NP_001269812; NP_001308106 NP_079328	NP_035867
Location (UCSC)	Chr 2: 134.96 – 135.05 Mb	Chr 1: 127.74 – 127.78 Mb
PubMed search
- Wikidata
View/Edit Human	View/Edit Mouse

Mitogen-activated protein kinase kinase kinase 19 is a protein that in humans is encoded by the MAP3K19 gene.
