= MAPKAPK5 =

Human protein-coding gene

Identifiers
- Aliases: MAPKAPK5, MAPKAP-K5, MK-5, MK5, PRAK, mitogen-activated protein kinase-activated protein kinase 5, MAPK activated protein kinase 5, NCFD
- External IDs: OMIM: 606723; MGI: 1333110; GeneCards: MAPKAPK5
Enzyme activity
EC #	BRENDA	ExPASy	KEGG	MetaCyc
2.7.11.1	↗	↗	↗	↗

Gene location (Human)
Chr.	Chromosome 12 (human)
Band	12q24.12-q24.13	Start	111,842,228 bp
Band	12q24.12-q24.13	End	111,902,222 bp

Gene location (Mouse)
Chr.	Chromosome 5 (mouse)
Band	5|5 F	Start	121,663,101 bp
Band	5|5 F	End	121,683,968 bp
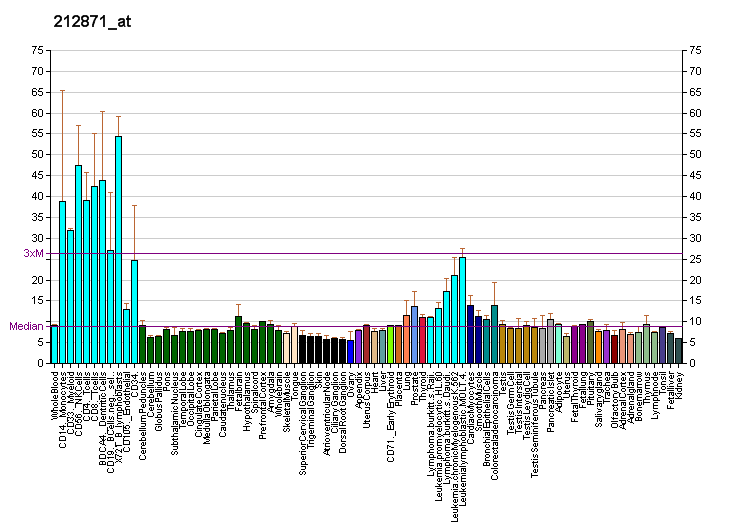

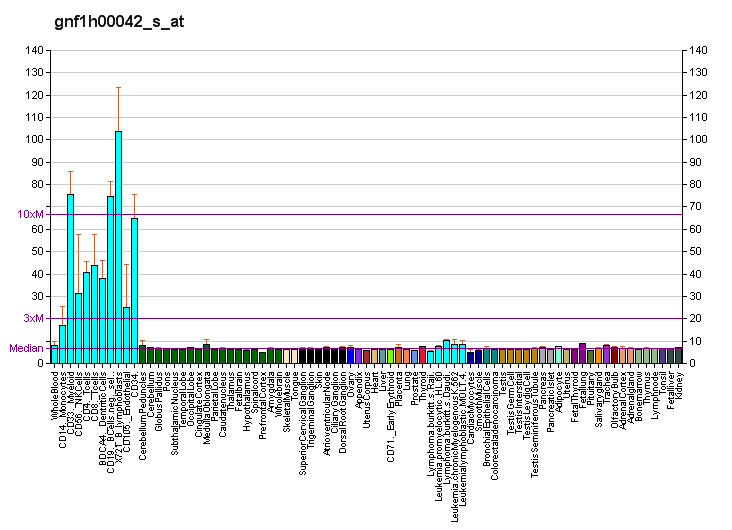
RNA expression pattern
Bgee	Human / Mouse (ortholog); Top expressed in: rectum; mucosa of transverse colon; jejunal mucosa; epithelium of colon; gastrocnemius muscle; ganglionic eminence; ventricular zone; body of pancreas; skin of leg; skin of abdomen / Top expressed in: zone of skin; neural layer of retina; skeletal muscle tissue; quadriceps femoris muscle; muscle of thigh; esophagus; jejunum; bone marrow; duodenum; ovary; More reference expression data
BioGPS	More reference expression data
Gene ontology
Molecular function	transferase activity; nucleotide binding; protein kinase activity; calcium-dependent protein serine/threonine kinase activity; p53 binding; calmodulin binding; kinase activity; protein serine/threonine kinase activity; protein binding; calmodulin-dependent protein kinase activity; ATP binding; MAP kinase kinase activity; mitogen-activated protein kinase binding
Cellular component	nucleoplasm; nucleus; cytoplasm; cytosol
Biological process	positive regulation of telomere capping; phosphorylation; stress-induced premature senescence; positive regulation of telomere maintenance via telomerase; protein phosphorylation; peptidyl-serine phosphorylation; positive regulation of telomerase activity; protein autophosphorylation; Ras protein signal transduction; regulation of translation; signal transduction; regulation of signal transduction by p53 class mediator; MAPK cascade; cell surface receptor signaling pathway; negative regulation of TOR signaling; intracellular signal transduction
Sources:Amigo / QuickGO
Orthologs
Databases	NCBI: entry; OMA: entry
Species	Human	Mouse
Entrez	8550	17165
Ensembl	ENSG00000089022	ENSMUSG00000029454
UniProt	Q8IW41	O54992
RefSeq (mRNA)	NM_003668; NM_139078; NM_001371479; NM_001371480; NM_001371481 NM_001371482; NM_001371483; NM_001371484; NM_001371485; NM_001371486; NM_001371487	NM_010765
RefSeq (protein)	NP_003659; NP_620777; NP_001358408; NP_001358409; NP_001358410 NP_001358411; NP_001358412; NP_001358413; NP_001358414; NP_001358415; NP_001358416	NP_034895
Location (UCSC)	Chr 12: 111.84 – 111.9 Mb	Chr 5: 121.66 – 121.68 Mb
PubMed search
- Wikidata
View/Edit Human	View/Edit Mouse

MAP kinase-activated protein kinase 5 is an enzyme that in humans is encoded by the MAPKAPK5 gene. The protein encoded by this gene is a member of the serine/threonine kinase family. In response to cellular stress and proinflammatory cytokines, this kinase is activated through its phosphorylation by MAP kinases, including MAPK1/ERK, MAPK14/p38-alpha, and MAPK11/p38-beta. In vitro, this kinase phosphorylates heat shock protein HSP27 at its physiologically relevant sites. Two alternately-spliced transcript variants of this gene encoding distinct isoforms have been reported.

A link between Alzheimer's disease and reduced levels of MAPKAPK5 has been proposed. Clinical trials may confirm if this is the case.
