= PIM3 =

Identifiers
- Aliases: PIM3, pim-3, Pim-3 proto-oncogene, serine/threonine kinase
- External IDs: OMIM: 610580; MGI: 1355297; HomoloGene: 56955; GeneCards: PIM3; OMA:PIM3 - orthologs

Gene location (Human)
Chr.	Chromosome 22 (human)
Band	22q13.33	Start	49,960,768 bp
Band	22q13.33	End	49,964,072 bp

Gene location (Mouse)
Chr.	Chromosome 15 (mouse)
Band	15|15 E3	Start	88,746,389 bp
Band	15|15 E3	End	88,749,929 bp
RNA expression pattern
Bgee	Human / Mouse (ortholog); Top expressed in: olfactory zone of nasal mucosa; skin of abdomen; skin of leg; body of stomach; upper lobe of left lung; minor salivary glands; left uterine tube; subcutaneous adipose tissue; right lung; gastrocnemius muscle / Top expressed in: Paneth cell; lacrimal gland; vestibular membrane of cochlear duct; cumulus cell; parotid gland; motor neuron; facial motor nucleus; substantia nigra; endothelial cell of lymphatic vessel; renal corpuscle; More reference expression data
BioGPS	n/a
Gene ontology
Molecular function	kinase activity; transferase activity; nucleotide binding; protein serine/threonine kinase activity; protein kinase activity; protein binding; ATP binding
Cellular component	cytoplasm; cytosol
Biological process	protein autophosphorylation; protein phosphorylation; cell cycle; negative regulation of insulin secretion involved in cellular response to glucose stimulus; negative regulation of apoptotic process; phosphorylation; regulation of mitotic cell cycle; apoptotic process
Sources:Amigo / QuickGO
Orthologs
Species	Human	Mouse
Entrez	415116	223775
Ensembl	ENSG00000198355	ENSMUSG00000035828
UniProt	Q86V86	P58750
RefSeq (mRNA)	NM_001001852	NM_145478
RefSeq (protein)	NP_001001852	NP_663453
Location (UCSC)	Chr 22: 49.96 – 49.96 Mb	Chr 15: 88.75 – 88.75 Mb
PubMed search
- Wikidata
View/Edit Human	View/Edit Mouse

Serine/threonine-protein kinase pim-3 is an enzyme that in humans is encoded by the PIM3 gene.
