= CAMKV =

Protein-coding gene in humans

Identifiers
- Aliases: CAMKV, 1G5, VACAMKL, CaM kinase like vesicle associated
- External IDs: OMIM: 614993; MGI: 2384296; GeneCards: CAMKV

Gene location (Human)
Chr.	Chromosome 3 (human)
Band	3p21.31	Start	49,857,988 bp
Band	3p21.31	End	49,869,935 bp

Gene location (Mouse)
Chr.	Chromosome 9 (mouse)
Band	9|9 F1	Start	107,812,873 bp
Band	9|9 F1	End	107,826,890 bp
RNA expression pattern
Bgee	Human / Mouse (ortholog); Top expressed in: nucleus accumbens; prefrontal cortex; right frontal lobe; caudate nucleus; putamen; anterior cingulate cortex; Brodmann area 9; amygdala; ganglionic eminence; hippocampus proper / Top expressed in: dentate gyrus of hippocampal formation granule cell; subiculum; superior frontal gyrus; primary visual cortex; olfactory tubercle; nucleus accumbens; hippocampus proper; subdivision of hippocampus; Region I of hippocampus proper; anterior amygdaloid area; More reference expression data
BioGPS	n/a
Gene ontology
Molecular function	protein kinase activity; ATP binding; calmodulin-dependent protein kinase activity; calmodulin binding
Cellular component	plasma membrane; cytoplasmic vesicle membrane; membrane; cytoplasmic vesicle; intracellular anatomical structure; glutamatergic synapse
Biological process	protein phosphorylation; peptidyl-serine phosphorylation; peptidyl-threonine phosphorylation; intracellular signal transduction; regulation of modification of postsynaptic structure
Sources:Amigo / QuickGO
Orthologs
Databases	NCBI: entry; OMA: entry
Species	Human	Mouse
Entrez	79012	235604
Ensembl	ENSG00000164076	ENSMUSG00000032936
UniProt	Q8NCB2	Q3UHL1
RefSeq (mRNA)	NM_024046; NM_001320147	NM_145621
RefSeq (protein)	NP_001307076; NP_076951	NP_663596
Location (UCSC)	Chr 3: 49.86 – 49.87 Mb	Chr 9: 107.81 – 107.83 Mb
PubMed search
- Wikidata
View/Edit Human	View/Edit Mouse

CAMKV or CaM kinase-like vesicle associated is a protein that in humans is encoded by the CAMKV gene. CAMKV is a serine/threonine protein kinase that is found in the synaptic compartments of neurons. It is known to bind calmodulin and is associated with neuroblastoma.
