= Cyclin-dependent kinase 14 =

Enzyme found in humans

CDK14

Identifiers
- Aliases: CDK14, PFTAIRE1, PFTK1, cyclin-dependent kinase 14, cyclin dependent kinase 14
- External IDs: OMIM: 610679; MGI: 894318; GeneCards: CDK14
Enzyme activity
EC #	BRENDA	ExPASy	KEGG	MetaCyc
2.7.11.22	↗	↗	↗	↗

Gene location (Human)
Chr.	Chromosome 7 (human)
Band	7q21.13	Start	90,466,424 bp
Band	7q21.13	End	91,210,590 bp

Gene location (Mouse)
Chr.	Chromosome 5 (mouse)
Band	5 A1|5 2.61 cM	Start	4,853,391 bp
Band	5 A1|5 2.61 cM	End	5,470,312 bp
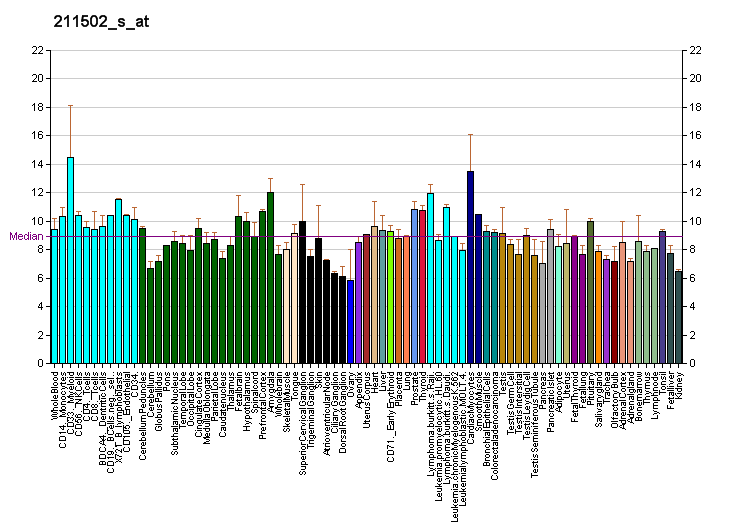

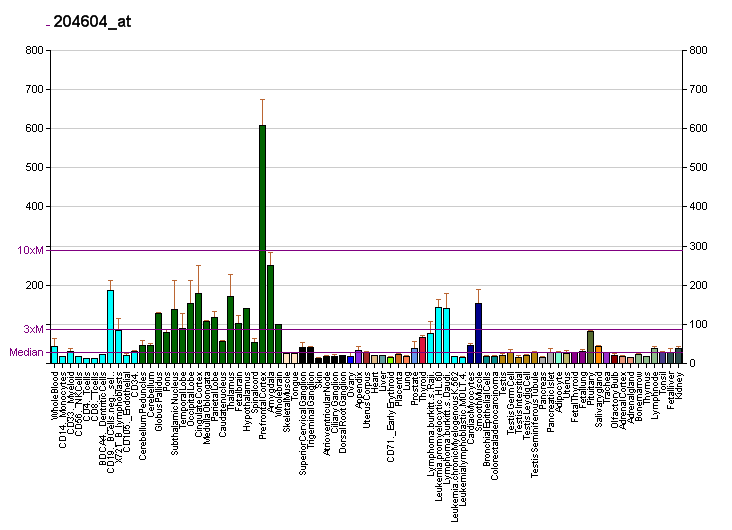
RNA expression pattern
Bgee	Human / Mouse (ortholog); Top expressed in: postcentral gyrus; Region I of hippocampus proper; pars compacta; pars reticulata; lateral nuclear group of thalamus; entorhinal cortex; Brodmann area 10; superior frontal gyrus; Brodmann area 46; tendon of biceps brachii / Top expressed in: cingulate gyrus; habenula; medial dorsal nucleus; amygdala; mammillary body; dentate gyrus; lateral geniculate nucleus; anterior amygdaloid area; pontine nuclei; medial geniculate nucleus; More reference expression data
BioGPS	More reference expression data
Gene ontology
Molecular function	transferase activity; nucleotide binding; protein kinase activity; cyclin-dependent protein serine/threonine kinase activity; kinase activity; protein serine/threonine kinase activity; protein binding; ATP binding; cyclin binding
Cellular component	membrane; plasma membrane; cytoplasmic cyclin-dependent protein kinase holoenzyme complex; nucleus; cytoplasm; cytosol
Biological process	phosphorylation; regulation of canonical Wnt signaling pathway; Wnt signaling pathway; cell division; protein phosphorylation; G2/M transition of mitotic cell cycle; cell cycle; regulation of cell cycle
Sources:Amigo / QuickGO
Orthologs
Databases	NCBI: entry; OMA: entry
Species	Human	Mouse
Entrez	5218	18647
Ensembl	ENSG00000058091	ENSMUSG00000028926
UniProt	O94921	O35495
RefSeq (mRNA)	NM_001287135; NM_001287136; NM_001287137; NM_012395	NM_011074; NM_001310448
RefSeq (protein)	NP_001274064; NP_001274065; NP_001274066; NP_036527	NP_001297377; NP_035204
Location (UCSC)	Chr 7: 90.47 – 91.21 Mb	Chr 5: 4.85 – 5.47 Mb
PubMed search
- Wikidata
View/Edit Human	View/Edit Mouse

Cyclin-dependent kinase 14 is an enzyme that in humans is encoded by the CDK14 gene (previously PFTK1).

== Interactions ==
PFTK1 has been shown to interact with SEPT8.
