= PSKH1 =

Enzyme found in humans

Identifiers
- Aliases: PSKH1, protein serine kinase H1
- External IDs: OMIM: 177015; MGI: 3528383; HomoloGene: 48461; GeneCards: PSKH1; OMA:PSKH1 - orthologs

Gene location (Human)
Chr.	Chromosome 16 (human)
Band	16q22.1	Start	67,893,254 bp
Band	16q22.1	End	67,929,676 bp

Gene location (Mouse)
Chr.	Chromosome 8 (mouse)
Band	8|8 D3	Start	106,627,073 bp
Band	8|8 D3	End	106,658,410 bp
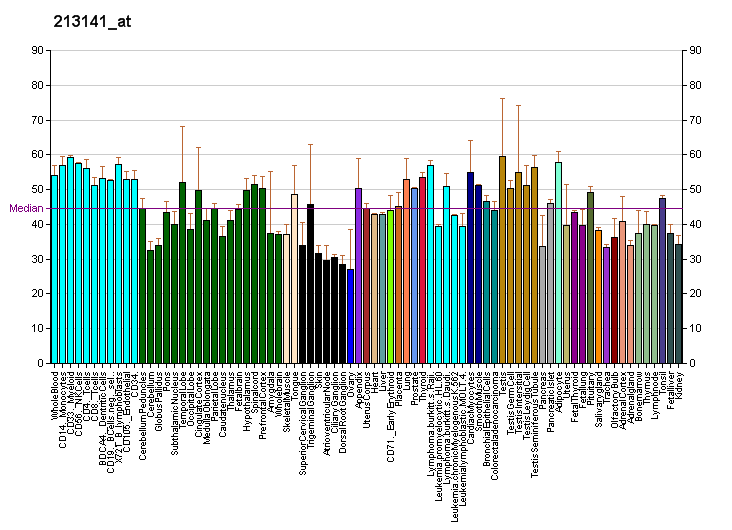
RNA expression pattern
Bgee	Human / Mouse (ortholog); Top expressed in: stromal cell of endometrium; mucosa of transverse colon; apex of heart; body of stomach; body of pancreas; right coronary artery; popliteal artery; tibial arteries; left ovary; left adrenal cortex / Top expressed in: hand; genital tubercle; zygote; internal carotid artery; tail of embryo; external carotid artery; secondary oocyte; foot; maxillary prominence; mandibular prominence; More reference expression data
BioGPS	More reference expression data
Gene ontology
Molecular function	transferase activity; nucleotide binding; protein kinase activity; kinase activity; protein binding; ATP binding; protein serine/threonine kinase activity
Cellular component	cytoplasm; Golgi apparatus; nuclear speck; endoplasmic reticulum membrane; membrane; plasma membrane; microtubule organizing center; endoplasmic reticulum; cytoskeleton; nucleus; intracellular anatomical structure; nucleoplasm; cellular component
Biological process	phosphorylation; protein phosphorylation; development of the heart; determination of left/right symmetry; peptidyl-serine phosphorylation; peptidyl-threonine phosphorylation; intracellular signal transduction
Sources:Amigo / QuickGO
Orthologs
Species	Human	Mouse
Entrez	5681	244631
Ensembl	ENSG00000159792	ENSMUSG00000048310
UniProt	P11801	Q91YA2
RefSeq (mRNA)	NM_006742	NM_173432
RefSeq (protein)	NP_006733	NP_775608
Location (UCSC)	Chr 16: 67.89 – 67.93 Mb	Chr 8: 106.63 – 106.66 Mb
PubMed search
- Wikidata
View/Edit Human	View/Edit Mouse

Protein Serine/threonine-protein kinase H1 is a Ser/Thr protein kinase that is encoded by the PSKH1 gene in humans and is associated with organelle membranes. PSKH1 resides within, and transits between, organelles in the human secretory pathway notably the Endoplasmic Reticulum.

== Interactions ==
PSKH1 is a regulated protein kinase with a defined substrate specificity, which has been shown to interact with (and be regulated by) proteins of the Cab45, reticulocalbin, Erc55, and calumenin family of calcium-binding proteins and calmodulin. It is also activated by UNC119B, an acyl chain binding protein. PSKH1 is closely related to the catalytically-inactive pseudokinase PSKH2, which is also membrane-localised within the secretory pathway.
