= UHMK1 =

Protein found in humans

Identifiers
- Aliases: UHMK1, KIS, KIST, P-CIP2, U2AF homology motif (UHM) kinase 1, U2AF homology motif kinase 1
- External IDs: OMIM: 608849; MGI: 1341908; GeneCards: UHMK1
Enzyme activity
EC #	BRENDA	ExPASy	KEGG	MetaCyc
2.7.11.1	↗	↗	↗	↗

Gene location (Human)
Chr.	Chromosome 1 (human)
Band	1q23.3	Start	162,497,251 bp
Band	1q23.3	End	162,529,631 bp

Gene location (Mouse)
Chr.	Chromosome 1 (mouse)
Band	1|1 H3	Start	170,020,989 bp
Band	1|1 H3	End	170,042,966 bp
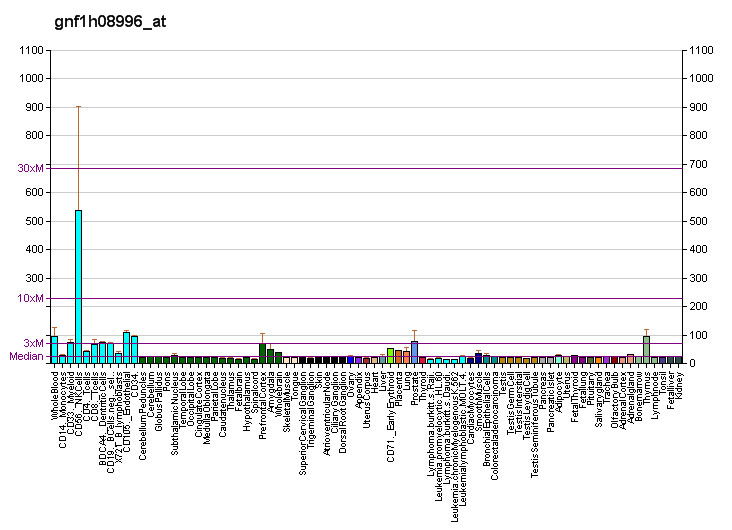
RNA expression pattern
Bgee	Human / Mouse (ortholog); Top expressed in: mucosa of ileum; pars compacta; spinal ganglia; epithelium of nasopharynx; pars reticulata; superior vestibular nucleus; trigeminal ganglion; nasal epithelium; endothelial cell; pancreatic epithelial cell / Top expressed in: medial vestibular nucleus; ventral tegmental area; dorsal tegmental nucleus; deep cerebellar nuclei; pontine nuclei; cingulate gyrus; supraoptic nucleus; habenula; CA3 field; medial dorsal nucleus; More reference expression data
BioGPS	More reference expression data
Gene ontology
Molecular function	transferase activity; nucleotide binding; protein kinase activity; kinase activity; protein serine/threonine kinase activity; protein binding; RNA binding; nucleic acid binding; ribonucleoprotein complex binding; ATP binding; poly-pyrimidine tract binding; pre-mRNA 3'-splice site binding
Cellular component	ribonucleoprotein granule; axon; neuronal ribonucleoprotein granule; dendrite cytoplasm; nucleus; nucleoplasm; Golgi apparatus; commitment complex; nuclear speck; U2-type prespliceosome; U2AF complex; cytoplasm
Biological process	regulation of protein export from nucleus; phosphorylation; protein phosphorylation; peptidyl-serine phosphorylation; protein autophosphorylation; neuron projection development; positive regulation of translational initiation
Sources:Amigo / QuickGO
Orthologs
Databases	NCBI: entry; OMA: entry
Species	Human	Mouse
Entrez	127933	16589
Ensembl	ENSG00000152332	ENSMUSG00000026667
UniProt	Q8TAS1	P97343
RefSeq (mRNA)	NM_001184763; NM_144624; NM_175866	NM_010633; NM_001360809
RefSeq (protein)	NP_001171692; NP_653225; NP_787062	NP_034763; NP_001347738
Location (UCSC)	Chr 1: 162.5 – 162.53 Mb	Chr 1: 170.02 – 170.04 Mb
PubMed search
- Wikidata
View/Edit Human	View/Edit Mouse

U2AF homology motif (UHM) kinase 1, also known as UHMK1, is a protein which in humans is encoded by the UHMK1 gene.

== Function ==
UHMK1 is a kinase enzyme which phosphorylates the protein stathmin and has an RNA recognition motif of unknown function.

== Clinical significance ==
UHMK1 is highly expressed in the brain and has been genetically implicated in schizophrenia in two genetic studies. Mice with the gene encoding stathmin knocked out, so that they do not express this protein in the brain, show abnormal fear responses. This effect could be developed as an animal model for schizophrenia. UHMK1 also phosphorylates the CNS proteins myelin basic protein (MBP) and synapsin I so that genetic abnormalities in UHMK1 could contribute to the genetic cause of schizophrenia through several different brain pathways. UHMK1 is also implicated in the progression of many cancers such as gastric, liver, colorectal, cervical and leukemia.
