= DAPK3 =

Protein-coding gene in the species Homo sapiens

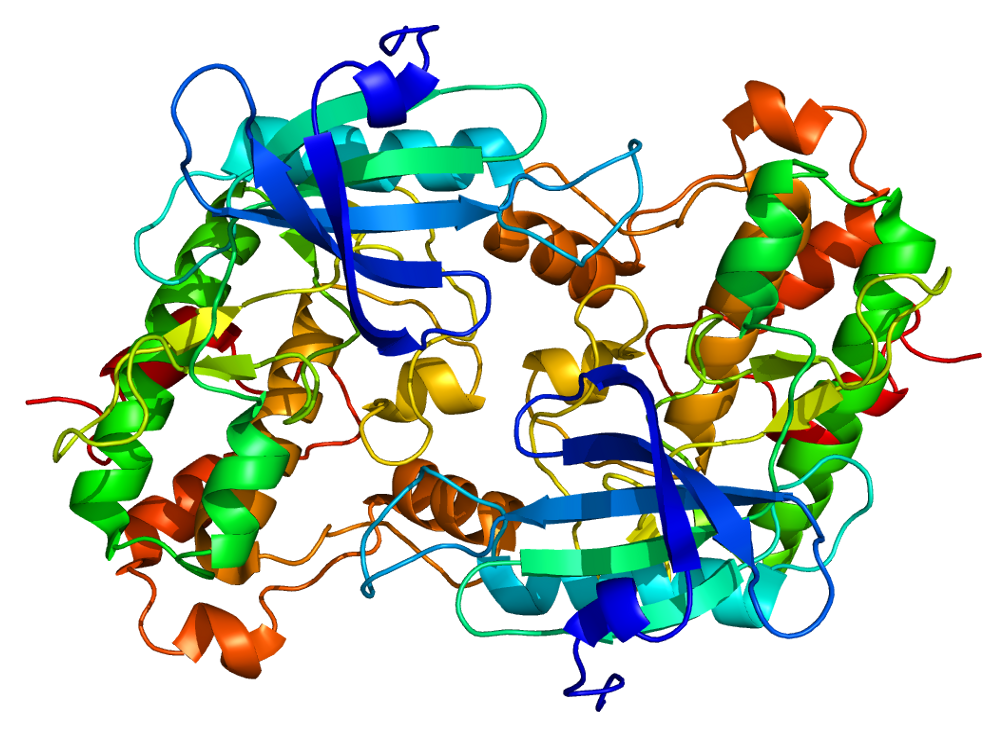

Identifiers
- Aliases: DAPK3, DLK, ZIP, ZIPK, death-associated protein kinase 3, death associated protein kinase 3
- External IDs: OMIM: 603289; MGI: 1203520; GeneCards: DAPK3
Available structures
PDB	Ortholog search: PDBe RCSB
PDB	List of PDB id codes 1YRP, 2J90, 3BHY, 3BQR, 5A6O, 5A6N
Enzyme activity
EC #	BRENDA	ExPASy	KEGG	MetaCyc
2.7.11.1	↗	↗	↗	↗

Gene location (Human)
Chr.	Chromosome 19 (human)
Band	19p13.3	Start	3,958,453 bp
Band	19p13.3	End	3,971,123 bp

Gene location (Mouse)
Chr.	Chromosome 10 (mouse)
Band	10 C1|10 39.72 cM	Start	81,018,839 bp
Band	10 C1|10 39.72 cM	End	81,029,031 bp
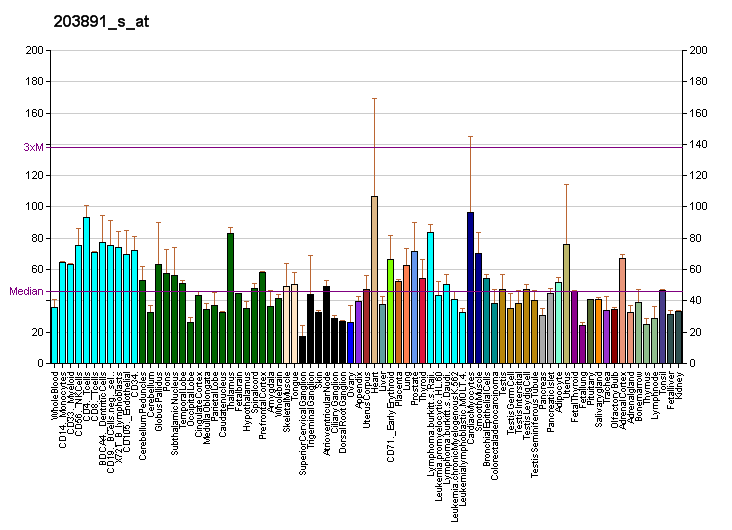
RNA expression pattern
Bgee	Human / Mouse (ortholog); Top expressed in: apex of heart; gastric mucosa; popliteal artery; tibial arteries; ascending aorta; stromal cell of endometrium; right auricle of heart; muscle layer of sigmoid colon; muscle of thigh; body of uterus / Top expressed in: yolk sac; muscle of thigh; lip; right kidney; superior frontal gyrus; primary visual cortex; granulocyte; spermatocyte; dentate gyrus of hippocampal formation granule cell; ventricular zone; More reference expression data
BioGPS	More reference expression data
Gene ontology
Molecular function	transferase activity; nucleotide binding; protein kinase activity; protein homodimerization activity; cAMP response element binding protein binding; kinase activity; protein serine/threonine kinase activity; leucine zipper domain binding; protein binding; identical protein binding; ATP binding; protein C-terminus binding
Cellular component	PML body; actin filament; membrane raft; nucleus; cytoplasm
Biological process	regulation of apoptotic process; regulation of actin cytoskeleton reorganization; negative regulation of translation; intracellular signal transduction; regulation of transcription, DNA-templated; regulation of smooth muscle contraction; phosphorylation; positive regulation of cell migration; positive regulation of canonical Wnt signaling pathway; regulation of myosin II filament organization; transcription, DNA-templated; regulation of cell motility; protein phosphorylation; positive regulation of extrinsic apoptotic signaling pathway in absence of ligand; regulation of autophagy; neuron differentiation; regulation of mitotic cell cycle; regulation of cell shape; positive regulation of apoptotic process; regulation of focal adhesion assembly; cellular response to interferon-gamma; apoptotic signaling pathway; protein autophosphorylation; regulation of translation; regulation of mitotic nuclear division; apoptotic process; peptidyl-serine phosphorylation; peptidyl-threonine phosphorylation; chromatin organization
Sources:Amigo / QuickGO
Orthologs
Databases	NCBI: entry; OMA: entry
Species	Human	Mouse
Entrez	1613	13144
Ensembl	ENSG00000167657	ENSMUSG00000034974
UniProt	O43293	O54784
RefSeq (mRNA)	NM_001348; NM_001375658	NM_001190473; NM_001190474; NM_007828
RefSeq (protein)	NP_001339; NP_001362587	NP_001177402; NP_001177403; NP_031854
Location (UCSC)	Chr 19: 3.96 – 3.97 Mb	Chr 10: 81.02 – 81.03 Mb
PubMed search
- Wikidata
View/Edit Human	View/Edit Mouse

Death-associated protein kinase 3 is an enzyme that in humans is encoded by the DAPK3 gene.

== Function ==
Death-associated protein kinase 3 (DAPK3) induces morphological changes in apoptosis when overexpressed in mammalian cells. These results suggest that DAPK3 may play a role in the induction of apoptosis.

Unlike most other mammalian genes, murine (rat and mouse) DAPK3 has undergone accelerated evolution and diverged from the tightly conserved consensus that is maintained from fish to human.

== Interactions ==
DAPK3 has been shown to interact with PAWR and Death associated protein 6.
