= DAPK1 =

Protein-coding gene in the species Homo sapiens

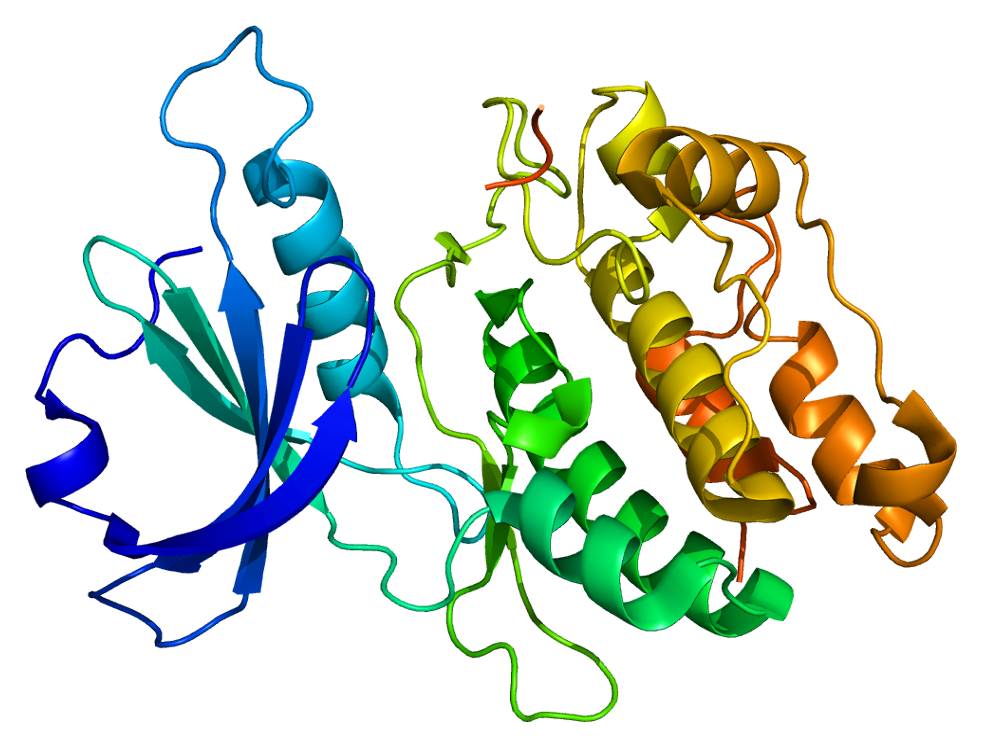

Identifiers
- Aliases: DAPK1, DAPK, death associated protein kinase 1, ROCO3
- External IDs: OMIM: 600831; MGI: 1916885; GeneCards: DAPK1
Available structures
PDB	Ortholog search: PDBe RCSB
PDB	List of PDB id codes 1IG1, 1JKK, 1JKL, 1JKS, 1JKT, 1P4F, 1WVX, 1WVY, 1YR5, 2W4J, 2W4K, 2X0G, 2XUU, 2XZS, 2Y0A, 2Y4P, 2Y4V, 2YAK, 3DFC, 3DGK, 3EH9, 3EHA, 3F5G, 3F5U, 3GU4, 3GU5, 3GU6, 3GU7, 3GU8, 3GUB, 3ZXT, 4B4L, 4PF4, 4TL0, 4TXC, 4UV0, 4YO4, 4YPD, 5AUW, 5AUU, 5AV1, 5AUY, 5AUT, 5AUX, 5AUV, 5AUZ, 5AV0, 5AV4, 5AV2, 5AV3
Enzyme activity
EC #	BRENDA	ExPASy	KEGG	MetaCyc
2.7.11.1	↗	↗	↗	↗

Gene location (Human)
Chr.	Chromosome 9 (human)
Band	9q21.33	Start	87,497,228 bp
Band	9q21.33	End	87,708,634 bp

Gene location (Mouse)
Chr.	Chromosome 13 (mouse)
Band	13 B2|13 32.53 cM	Start	60,749,761 bp
Band	13 B2|13 32.53 cM	End	60,911,005 bp
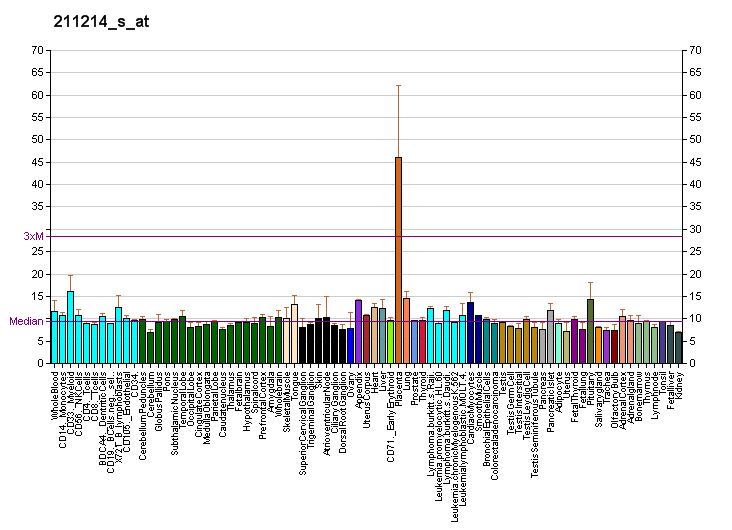

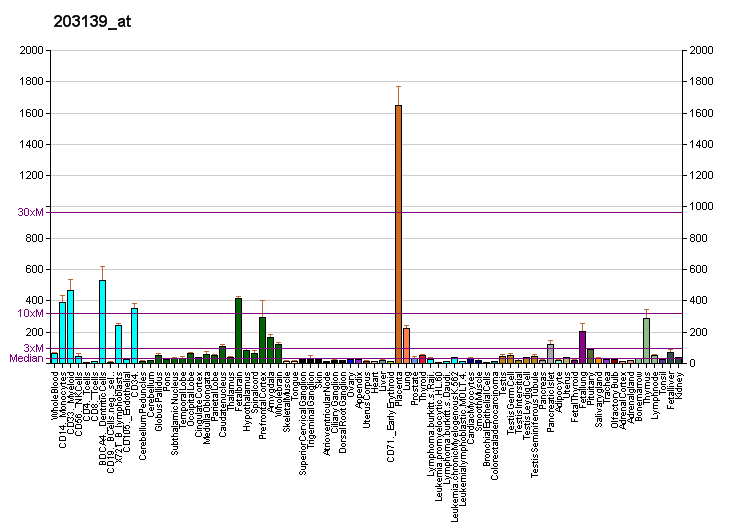
RNA expression pattern
Bgee	Human / Mouse (ortholog); Top expressed in: germinal epithelium; palpebral conjunctiva; placenta; left ovary; middle temporal gyrus; parietal pleura; corpus epididymis; gallbladder; pancreatic ductal cell; monocyte / Top expressed in: saccule; lateral septal nucleus; otic vesicle; left lung lobe; olfactory tubercle; subiculum; genital tubercle; piriform cortex; pineal gland; anterior amygdaloid area; More reference expression data
BioGPS	More reference expression data
Gene ontology
Molecular function	transferase activity; nucleotide binding; GTP binding; syntaxin-1 binding; kinase activity; protein binding; identical protein binding; calmodulin-dependent protein kinase activity; protein serine/threonine kinase activity; calmodulin binding; ATP binding; protein kinase activity
Cellular component	plasma membrane; actin cytoskeleton; cytoskeleton; cytoplasm; nucleus
Biological process	regulation of apoptotic process; negative regulation of translation; phosphorylation; negative regulation of apoptotic process; positive regulation of cysteine-type endopeptidase activity involved in apoptotic process; regulation of autophagy; negative regulation of extrinsic apoptotic signaling pathway via death domain receptors; apoptotic signaling pathway; protein autophosphorylation; regulation of translation; extrinsic apoptotic signaling pathway via death domain receptors; signal transduction; apoptotic process; regulation of NMDA receptor activity; protein phosphorylation; positive regulation of autophagy; intracellular signal transduction; cellular response to interferon-gamma; cellular response to hydroperoxide
Sources:Amigo / QuickGO
Orthologs
Databases	NCBI: entry; OMA: entry
Species	Human	Mouse
Entrez	1612	69635
Ensembl	ENSG00000196730	ENSMUSG00000021559
UniProt	P53355	Q80YE7
RefSeq (mRNA)	NM_001288729; NM_001288730; NM_001288731; NM_004938	NM_001285917; NM_029653; NM_134062
RefSeq (protein)	NP_001275658; NP_001275659; NP_001275660; NP_004929	NP_001272846; NP_083929; NP_598823
Location (UCSC)	Chr 9: 87.5 – 87.71 Mb	Chr 13: 60.75 – 60.91 Mb
PubMed search
- Wikidata
View/Edit Human	View/Edit Mouse

Death-associated protein kinase 1 is an enzyme that in humans is encoded by the DAPK1 gene.

== Function ==
Death-associated protein kinase 1 is a positive mediator of gamma-interferon induced programmed cell death. DAPK1 encodes a structurally unique 160-kD calmodulin dependent serine-threonine kinase that carries 8 ankyrin repeats and 2 putative P-loop consensus sites. It is a tumor suppressor candidate.

In melanocytic cells DAPK1 gene expression may be regulated by MITF.

== As a drug target ==
Depletion of DAPK1 results in inhibition of tumor cell count and volume growth in cellular and animal models of triple receptor-negative breast cancer, from individuals with p53-mutant cancers. This has not been demonstrated in actual patients.
