= MAP kinase kinase kinase =

Class of enzymes

Mitogen-activated protein kinase kinase kinase

Identifiers
- EC no.: 2.7.11.25
- CAS no.: 146702-84-3

Databases
- BRENDA: enzyme data
- ExPASy: NiceZyme view
- KEGG: enzyme entry
- MetaCyc: metabolic pathway
- Rhea: reactions
- PDB structures: RCSB PDB PDBe PDBsum
Search
- PMC: articles
- PubMed: articles
- NCBI: proteins

Mitogen Activated Protein (MAP) kinase kinase kinase (MAPKKK, MKKK, M3K, or, MAP3K) is a serine/threonine-specific protein kinase which acts upon MAP kinase kinase. Subsequently, MAP kinase kinase activates MAP kinase. Several types of MAPKKK can exist but are mainly characterized by the MAP kinases they activate. MAPKKKs are stimulated by a large range of stimuli, primarily environmental and intracellular stressors. MAPKKK is responsible for various cell functions such as cell proliferation, cell differentiation, and apoptosis. The duration and intensity of signals determine which pathway ensues. Additionally, the use of protein scaffolds helps to place the MAPKKK in close proximity with its substrate to allow for a reaction. Lastly, because MAPKKK is involved in a series of several pathways, it has been used as a therapeutic target for cancer, amyloidosis, and neurodegenerative diseases. In humans, there are at least 19 genes which encode MAP kinase kinase kinases:

- MAP3K1 (aka MEKK1)
- MAP3K2 (aka MEKK2)
- MAP3K3 (aka MEKK3)
- MAP3K4 (aka MEKK4)
- MAP3K5 (aka ASK1)
- MAP3K6 (aka ASK2)
- MAP3K7 (aka MEKK7) (aka TAK1)
- MAP3K8 (aka TPL2 or Tpl2)
- MAP3K9
- MAP3K10
- MAP3K11 (aka MEKK11) (aka MLK3)
- MAP3K12 (aka MUK)
- MAP3K13 (aka LZK)
- MAP3K14
- MAP3K15
- MAP3K16 (aka TAO1 or TAOK1)
- MAP3K17 (aka TAO2 or TAOK2)
- MAP3K18 (aka TAO3 or TAOK3)
- RAF1
- BRAF
- ARAF
- ZAK (aka MLTK)

== Classes of MAPKKK and their functions ==
Several classes of MAPKKK exist, and all of them are upstream of MAP kinases. There are three main classes of MAP Kinases and are regulated by their respective MAPKKKs. These MAP kinases include the extracellular regulated kinases (ERKs), the c-Jun N-terminal Kinases (JNKs), and the p38 MAP kinase. The ERKs are regulated by the Raf family of MAPKKKs and are responsible for cell growth, differentiation, and meiosis. Perhaps the best characterized MAP3K are the members of the oncogenic RAF family (RAF1, BRAF, ARAF), which are effectors of mitogenic ras signaling and which activate the ERK1/2 (MAPK3/MAPK1) pathway, through activation of MEK1(MAP2K1) and MEK2(MAP2K2). The JNKs are regulated by the MEKK 1/4, MLK 2/3, and ASK 1 MAPKKKs. The p38 MAPK is regulated by MEKK 1-4 and TAO 1/2 families of MAPKKKs and is responsible for inflammation, apoptosis, cell differentiation, and cell cycle regulation. The determination for what cascade is followed is based upon the type of signal, the strength of binding, and the length of binding.

MEKK1 activates MAPK8/JNK by phosphorylation of its activator SEK1(MAP2K4).

MAP3K3 directly regulates the MAPK8/JNK and extracellular signal-regulated protein kinase (ERK) pathways by activating SEK and MEK1/2 respectively; it does not regulate the p38 pathway.

MAP3K7(TAK1) participates in regulation of transcription by transforming growth factor-beta (TGF-beta).

== Activation and deactivation of MAPKKK ==
The most upstream stimuli that activate MAPKKK is either stress or growth factors. This includes mitogens, inflammatory cytokines, ER stress, oxidative stress, UV radiation, and DNA damage. Most MAPKKKs are activated through GPCR's where the signal from the stimuli binds to the GPCR and the GTPase activity of the g-protein activates the downstream MAPKKK. Other mechanisms for MAPKKK do exist. For instance, the MAPKKK ASK-1 is activated by a receptor-tyrosine kinase specific for a tumor necrosis factor. Since MAPKKK are activated through the addition of a phosphates group on a serine/threonine residue, they are deactivated by a phosphatase. A common phosphatase used in ASK-1 regulation is PP5. MAPKKKs contain a docking domain which is different from their active site that allows them to contact another substrate. Additionally, several scaffolds are used in the MAPKKK cascade in order to ensure that a specific cascade is used. These scaffolds have a binding site for the MAPKKK, MAPKK, and MAPK, ensuring that the signal occurs rapidly.

== Clinical significance ==
Because MAPKKKs are involved in a wide range of cell responses occurring both in the cytoplasm and the nucleus, a mutation in these genes can cause several diseases. Over-expression of the MAPKKK upstream of the ERK 1/2 MAPK and an increase in epidermal growth factor receptor (EGFR) can lead to tumor formation, such as triple negative breast cancer. A mutation in the JNK or p38 family of MAPK or their MAPKKK upstream precursors can result in Alzheimer's disease. This is also seen when there is too much oxidative stress in the brain, causing these MAPKs to undergo more apoptosis and destroy brain cells. MLK, a type of MAPKKK, are associated with Parkinson's disease and inhibitors to the MLK proteins have been shown to treat Parkinson's disease. The MAPKKK pathways and specifically the over-expression of cascades of JNK and p38 are also involved in Crohn's disease and polycystic kidney disease. Inhibitors of these pathways help in treating the symptoms of the diseases.

== Images ==
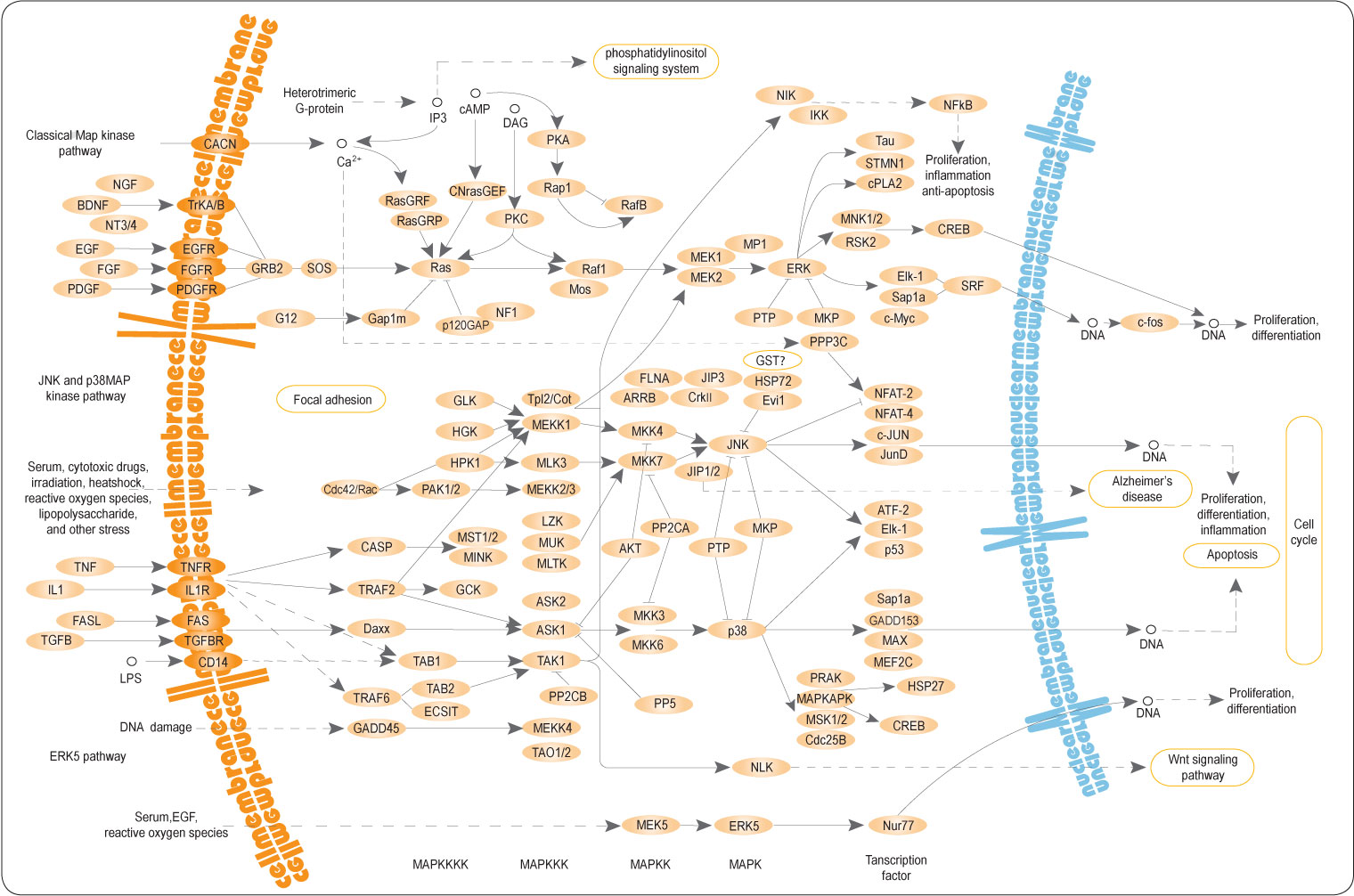
MAPK pathway. Many of the MAP3K's here are labelled by their alternative names.

== See also ==
- MAP kinase
- MAP kinase kinase
- MAP kinase kinase kinase kinase
- List of unusual biological names
