= MAP2K7 =

Protein-coding gene in the species Homo sapiens

Identifiers
- Aliases: MAP2K7, JNKK2, MAPKK7, MEK, MEK 7, MKK7, PRKMK7, SAPKK-4, SAPKK4, mitogen-activated protein kinase kinase 7
- External IDs: OMIM: 603014; MGI: 1346871; GeneCards: MAP2K7
Available structures
| PDB | Ortholog search: PDBe RCSB |
| PDB | List of PDB id codes 2DYL, 3WZU, 4UX9, 5B2K, 5B2L, 5B2M |
Enzyme activity
| EC # | BRENDA | ExPASy | KEGG | MetaCyc |
|---|---|---|---|---|
| 2.7.12.2 | ↗ | ↗ | ↗ | ↗ |

Gene location (Human)
| Chr. | Chromosome 19 (human) |
| Band | 19p13.2 | Start | 7,903,843 bp |
| Band | 19p13.2 | End | 7,914,478 bp |

Gene location (Mouse)
| Chr. | Chromosome 8 (mouse) |
| Band | 8|8 A1.1 | Start | 4,288,740 bp |
| Band | 8|8 A1.1 | End | 4,297,897 bp |
RNA expression pattern
| Bgee | Human / Mouse (ortholog); Top expressed in: buccal mucosa cell; tendon of biceps brachii; gastrocnemius muscle; right hemisphere of cerebellum; Skeletal muscle tissue of rectus abdominis; nipple; muscle of thigh; cardia; body of tongue; body of uterus / Top expressed in: external carotid artery; internal carotid artery; median eminence; Gonadal ridge; habenula; arcuate nucleus; lateral geniculate nucleus; paraventricular nucleus of hypothalamus; dorsomedial hypothalamic nucleus; lateral hypothalamus; More reference expression data |
| BioGPS | n/a |
Gene ontology
| Molecular function | metal ion binding; nucleotide binding; protein tyrosine kinase activity; protein kinase binding; protein kinase activity; magnesium ion binding; transferase activity; kinase activity; ATP binding; enzyme binding; protein phosphatase binding; protein binding; MAP kinase kinase activity; protein serine/threonine kinase activity; JUN kinase kinase activity |
| Cellular component | nucleus; cytoplasm; cytosol |
| Biological process | response to UV; signal transduction; positive regulation of telomerase activity; positive regulation of telomere maintenance via telomerase; positive regulation of telomere capping; apoptotic process; response to osmotic stress; peptidyl-tyrosine phosphorylation; response to tumor necrosis factor; protein phosphorylation; response to heat; phosphorylation; stress-activated MAPK cascade; regulation of mitotic cell cycle; regulation of apoptotic process; stress-activated protein kinase signaling cascade; activation of protein kinase activity; positive regulation of transcription, DNA-templated; positive regulation of ERK1 and ERK2 cascade; JNK cascade; Fc-epsilon receptor signaling pathway |
Sources:Amigo / QuickGO
Orthologs
| Databases | NCBI: entry; OMA: entry |
| Species | Human | Mouse |
| Entrez | 5609 | 26400 |
| Ensembl | ENSG00000076984 | ENSMUSG00000002948 |
| UniProt | O14733 | Q8CE90 |
| RefSeq (mRNA) | NM_001297555; NM_001297556; NM_145185 | NM_001042557; NM_001164172; NM_001291777; NM_001291778; NM_001291783 NM_011944 |
| RefSeq (protein) | NP_001284484; NP_001284485; NP_660186 | NP_001036022; NP_001157644; NP_001278706; NP_001278707; NP_001278712 NP_036074 |
| Location (UCSC) | Chr 19: 7.9 – 7.91 Mb | Chr 8: 4.29 – 4.3 Mb |
| PubMed search |
- Wikidata
| View/Edit Human | View/Edit Mouse |

Dual specificity mitogen-activated protein kinase kinase 7, also known as MAP kinase kinase 7 or MKK7, is an enzyme that in humans is encoded by the MAP2K7 gene. This protein is a member of the mitogen-activated protein kinase kinase family. The MKK7 protein exists as six different isoforms with three possible N-termini (α, β, and γ isoforms) and two possible C-termini (1 and 2 isoforms).

MKK7 is involved in signal transduction mediating the cell responses to proinflammatory cytokines, and environmental stresses. This kinase specifically activates MAPK8/JNK1 and MAPK9/JNK2, and this kinase itself is phosphorylated and activated by MAP kinase kinase kinases including MAP3K1/MEKK1, MAP3K2/MEKK2, MAP3K3/MEKK5, and MAP4K2/GCK.

MKK7 is ubiquitously expressed in all tissue. However, it displays a higher level of expression in skeletal muscle. Multiple alternatively spliced transcript variants encoding distinct isoforms have been found.

== Nomenclature ==
MAP2K7 is also known as:

- MKK7
- JNK-activated kinase 2
- MAPK/ERK kinase 7 (MEK7)
- Stress-activated protein kinase kinase 4 (SAPK kinase 4, SAPKK4)
- c-Jun N-terminal kinase kinase 2 (JNK kinase 2, JNKK2)
- Stress-activated / extracellular signal-regulated protein kinase kinase 2 (SEK2)

== Isoforms ==
The murine MKK7 protein is encoded by 14 exons which can be alternatively spliced to yield a group of protein kinases. This results in six isoforms with three possible N-termini (α, β, and γ isoforms) and two possible C-termini (1 and 2 isoforms). The molecular mass of the isoforms spans from 38 to 52 kDa, with between 345 and 467 amino acids.

The physiological relevance of the different MKK7 isoforms is still unclear. Evidence shows that the MKK7α, which lacks an NH_{2}-terminal extension, shows a lower basal activity in binding JNK compared to the MKKβ and γ isoforms. The increased basal activity in the β and γ isoforms can be due to the three D-motifs present in the N-terminus of these isoforms.

== Structure and function ==
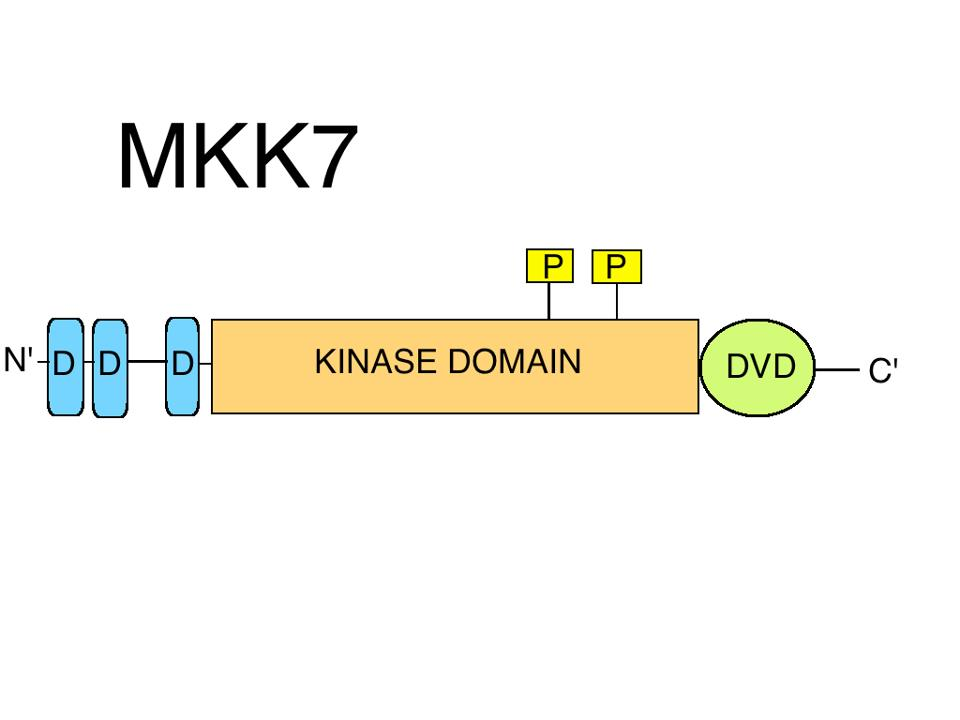
The architecture of MKK7: Box-model illustration of the structure of MKK7.

=== D-motifs ===
MKK7 has three conserved D-motifs (MAPK-recruiting short linear motifs) on its intrinsically disordered N-terminus. D-motifs typically consist of a cluster of positively charged amino acids followed by alternating hydrophobic amino acids. D-motifs are strictly required for the recruitment of MAPKK substrates, such as JNK. The kinase domains of MAPKs contain certain surface features, such as the so-called common docking (CD) region, alongside the docking (D) groove, that specifically recognize their cognate D-motifs. The D-motifs found in MKK7 are highly specific for JNKs, but have a relatively low binding affinity. It was suggested that the motifs of MKK7 can synergize with each other to provide an efficient substrate phosphorylation It has been shown that all three D-motifs are necessary for correct JNK1:MKK7 complex formations, and for the phosphorylation and activation of JNK1 by MKK7.

=== DVD region ===
A special extension to the C-terminal kinase domain core, the so-called "Domain for Versatile Docking" (DVD) is a region found in MKK7 as in most known MAP2Ks,. The DVD region is a stable, mostly helical fold of roughly 20 amino acids, that adds onto the back side of the catalytic core of the MAP2K kinase domains. This domain extension is both required for the specific binding to, and activation of MKK7 by respective upstream MAPKKKs. Other mitogen activated protein kinase kinases also require the DVD region (in addition to various other non-canonical elements of their kinase domains, like the "MKK1/2-loop") to be able to discriminate against the various MAPKKK upstream. These special MAPKK:MAPKKK kinase-domain/kinase-domain interactions facilitate the phosphorylation of MKK7. In addition to the activation of MKK7, binding to the DVD region may also affect the MKK7 activation loop in such a way that the Ser and Thr of the S-K-A-K-T motif become accessible for phosphorylation.

=== Kinase domain ===
The MKK7 contains one kinase domain. The direct MKK7:MAPKKK interaction (using the DVD region), facilitates the phosphorylation of MKK7 by MAPKKKs on serine and threonine in a S-K-A-K-T motif in the catalytic domain (kinase domain).

== Signaling and regulation ==
MKK7 play an important part in the stress-activated protein kinase/c-Jun N-terminal kinase (SAP/JNK) signaling pathway. In collaboration with another mitogen-activated protein kinase kinase MKK4, MKK7 work as crucial transducers upstream of JNK signaling. Through joint efforts the two MKKs phosphorylate different JNK isoforms. As a result, MKK7 has a great impact on numerous physiological processes such as proliferation and differentiation, as well as pathological processes such as apoptosis and tumorigenesis. MKK7 are activated as a result of cellular stresses. They are activated by a number of MKKKs through phosphorylation at a S-K-A-K-T motif located in the MKK7s kinase domain. The MKKKs relate to MKK7 through its DVD site at the C-terminus and phosphorylate MKK7 at serine and threonine residues. Once activated, MKK4 and MKK7 directly phosphorylate specific tyrosine and threonine residues located in the conserved T-P-Y motif of the activation loop of the JNK protein. Although MKK7 act through dual specificity it tends to phosphorylate threonine on JNK protein, leaving MKK4 to phosphorylate tyrosine. Phosphorylated and activated JNKs activate substrates like transcription factors or pro-apoptotic protein. MKK7 and MKK4 seem to be regulating the expression of each other, thereby affecting the JNK signaling. The mono-phosphorylation of JNK on a threonine residue is adequate for the increase in JNK activity, which argues that MKK7 is an important constituent for JNK activity, while the additional phosphorylation of the tyrosine residue by MKK4 provide for a more favorable activation. Overall, MAP2K7 contains multiple amino acid sites that are phosphorylated and ubiquitinated.

=== Scaffold proteins ===
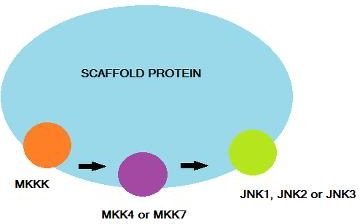
Scaffold protein: A tradiational model showing how a scaffold protein is envisioned to bind a MAPKKK, MAPKK and a MAPK in a multienzyme complex. Note that this model is outdated for JIP1, as it does not assemble an on-scaffold kinase cascade, but provides a selective release of MKK7 and DLK in specific compartments instead

In addition to the direct interactions between JNK, MKK7 and other upstream protein kinases, various scaffold proteins function to ensure specificity between the components of the MAPK signaling cascade. Different JNK isoforms, MAPK, and MAPKKs (e.g., MKK7 or MKK4) bind specifically to the scaffold proteins. Several mammalian scaffold proteins have been identified. These include the JNK-interacting protein (JIP) 1 and its closerly-related homolog, JIP2 or the (completely unrelated) JIP3 and JIP4 proteins. Nevertheless, JIP1/2 and JIP3/4 were shown to be capable of direct interaction with each other. Plenty of Src-homology-3 (POSH) has also been shown to be a partner of JIP1/2.

All these JNK pathway regulators assemble transport complexes, tied to kinesin-dependent vesicular transport. In this context, JIP1/2 act as cargo adaptors, binding to a motor protein and a cargo protein simultaneously. In addition to their "normal" cargoes (C-termini of transmembrane proteins), they also transport MAP2K and MAP3K enzymes, namely MKK7, DLK and MLK3. Kinases bound to the JIP1/2 scaffold are generally sequestrated and thought to be inactive. Since the cargo-linkage mechanism of this complex is believed to be phosphporylation-dependent, phosphorylation by JNK kinase can release its own upstream activators from the scaffold, thus driving a strong local positive feedback loop.

== Interactions ==
MAP2K7 has been shown to interact with:

- CNKSR1
- MAP3K1
- MAPK8
- MAPK8IP3
- MAPK8IP1
- GADD45B
- MAP3K12
- MAP3K2
- MAPK8IP2
- DUSP19

== Biological relevance ==
MKK7 is involved in the development of epithelial tissues such as skin and lungs, and also the developing teeth, during early embryogenesis in mice. Experiments also indicate that MKK7 in addition to MKK4 are required for mammalian body plan organization during embryogenesis. MKK7 has also been suggested to function as a putative Metastase Suppressor Gene (MSG) by possibly promoting tumor dormancy at the metastatic site. In small mammals, stress like pressure overload can cause cardiac hypertrophy and failure if MKK7 is knocked out. Conditional deletion of Map2k7 in neural stem cells and postmitotic neurons identified a role for MKK7 in axonal elongation. Neuron-specific deletion of Map2k7 showed a role for MKK7 in age-dependent motor dysfunction. Genetic variations in MAP2K7 have been associated with schizophrenia in humans.
