= MAP3K15 =

Protein-coding gene in the species Homo sapiens

Identifiers
- Aliases: MAP3K15, ASK3, bA723P2.3, mitogen-activated protein kinase kinase kinase 15
- External IDs: OMIM: 300820; MGI: 2448588; GeneCards: MAP3K15
Enzyme activity
EC #	BRENDA	ExPASy	KEGG	MetaCyc
2.7.11.25	↗	↗	↗	↗

Gene location (Human)
Chr.	X chromosome (human)
Band	Xp22.12	Start	19,360,056 bp
Band	Xp22.12	End	19,515,508 bp

Gene location (Mouse)
Chr.	X chromosome (mouse)
Band	X|X F4	Start	158,771,429 bp
Band	X|X F4	End	158,906,347 bp
RNA expression pattern
Bgee	Human / Mouse (ortholog); Top expressed in: right adrenal cortex; left adrenal cortex; islet of Langerhans; testicle; spleen; gonad; human kidney; pituitary gland; anterior pituitary; ganglionic eminence / Top expressed in: granulocyte; proximal tubule; islet of Langerhans; right kidney; human kidney; secondary oocyte; primary oocyte; epiblast; zygote; tail of embryo; More reference expression data
BioGPS	n/a
Gene ontology
Molecular function	transferase activity; nucleotide binding; protein kinase activity; protein serine/threonine kinase activity; MAP kinase kinase kinase activity; ATP binding; metal ion binding; kinase activity
Cellular component	intracellular anatomical structure
Biological process	protein phosphorylation; phosphorylation; MAPK cascade
Sources:Amigo / QuickGO
Orthologs
Databases	NCBI: entry; OMA: entry
Species	Human	Mouse
Entrez	389840	270672
Ensembl	ENSG00000180815	ENSMUSG00000031303
UniProt	Q6ZN16	A2AQW0
RefSeq (mRNA)	NM_001001671	NM_001163085
RefSeq (protein)	NP_001001671	NP_001156557
Location (UCSC)	Chr X: 19.36 – 19.52 Mb	Chr X: 158.77 – 158.91 Mb
PubMed search
- Wikidata
View/Edit Human	View/Edit Mouse

Mitogen-activated protein kinase kinase kinase 15 is a protein that in humans is encoded by the MAP3K15 gene.

== Function ==
The protein encoded by this gene is a member of the mitogen-activated protein kinase (MAPK) family. These family members function in a protein kinase signal transduction cascade, where an activated MAPK kinase kinase (MAP3K) phosphorylates and activates a specific MAPK kinase (MAP2K), which then activates a specific MAPK. This MAP3K protein plays an essential role in apoptotic cell death triggered by cellular stresses.
