= MAP3K12 =

Enzyme

Identifiers
- Aliases: MAP3K12, DLK, MEKK12, MUK, ZPK, ZPKP1, mitogen-activated protein kinase kinase kinase 12, HP09298
- External IDs: OMIM: 600447; MGI: 1346881; GeneCards: MAP3K12
Available structures
| PDB | Ortholog search: PDBe RCSB |
| PDB | List of PDB id codes 5CEN, 5CEP, 5CEQ, 5CEO |
Enzyme activity
| EC # | BRENDA | ExPASy | KEGG | MetaCyc |
|---|---|---|---|---|
| 2.7.11.25 | ↗ | ↗ | ↗ | ↗ |

Gene location (Human)
| Chr. | Chromosome 12 (human) |
| Band | 12q13.13 | Start | 53,479,669 bp |
| Band | 12q13.13 | End | 53,500,063 bp |

Gene location (Mouse)
| Chr. | Chromosome 15 (mouse) |
| Band | 15|15 F3 | Start | 102,406,081 bp |
| Band | 15|15 F3 | End | 102,425,499 bp |
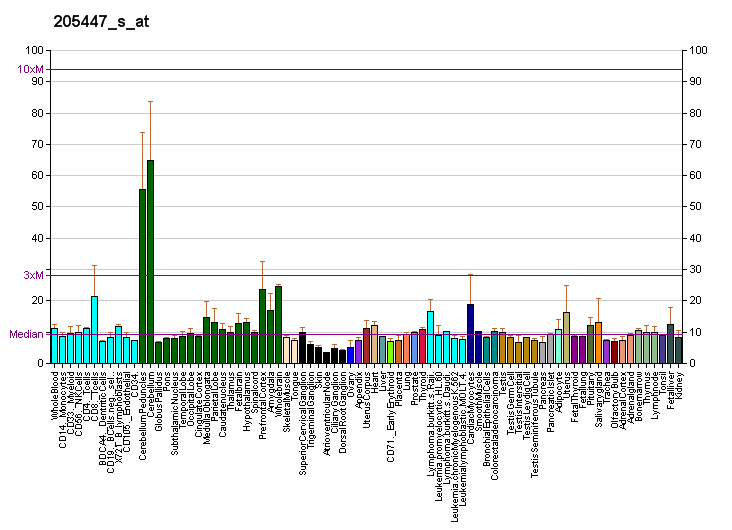

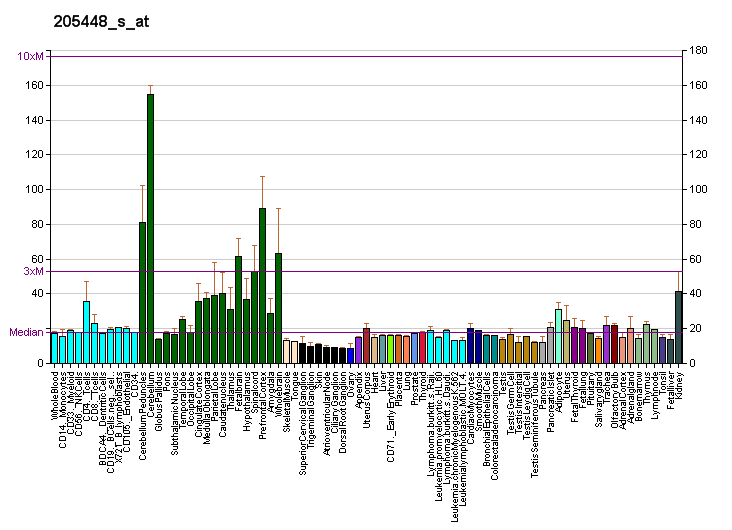
RNA expression pattern
| Bgee | Human / Mouse (ortholog); Top expressed in: right hemisphere of cerebellum; gastric mucosa; right uterine tube; right ovary; right frontal lobe; anterior pituitary; canal of the cervix; cerebellar vermis; body of uterus; left ovary / Top expressed in: ascending aorta; aortic valve; supraoptic nucleus; otic placode; submandibular gland; internal carotid artery; lobe of cerebellum; tunica media of zone of aorta; external carotid artery; intercostal muscle; More reference expression data |
| BioGPS | More reference expression data |
Gene ontology
| Molecular function | transferase activity; protein kinase activity; nucleotide binding; protein homodimerization activity; kinase activity; protein binding; MAP kinase kinase kinase activity; ATP binding; protein kinase binding; protein serine/threonine kinase activity; signal transducer activity; JUN kinase kinase kinase activity |
| Cellular component | cytoplasm; cytosol; membrane; growth cone; plasma membrane; axon |
| Biological process | intracellular signal transduction; phosphorylation; protein phosphorylation; JNK cascade; peptidyl-serine phosphorylation; protein autophosphorylation; peptidyl-threonine phosphorylation; negative regulation of motor neuron apoptotic process; MAPK cascade; positive regulation of transcription, DNA-templated; positive regulation of ERK1 and ERK2 cascade |
Sources:Amigo / QuickGO
Orthologs
| Databases | NCBI: entry; OMA: entry |
| Species | Human | Mouse |
| Entrez | 7786 | 26404 |
| Ensembl | ENSG00000139625 | ENSMUSG00000023050 |
| UniProt | Q12852 | Q60700 |
| RefSeq (mRNA) | NM_001193511; NM_006301 | NM_001163643; NM_009582; NM_001358844 |
| RefSeq (protein) | NP_001180440; NP_006292 | NP_001157115; NP_033608; NP_001345773 |
| Location (UCSC) | Chr 12: 53.48 – 53.5 Mb | Chr 15: 102.41 – 102.43 Mb |
| PubMed search |
- Wikidata
| View/Edit Human | View/Edit Mouse |

Mitogen-activated protein kinase 12 is an enzyme that in humans is encoded by the MAP3K12 gene.

== Function ==
The protein encoded by this gene is a member of serine/threonine protein kinase family. This kinase contains a leucine-zipper domain, and is predominately expressed in neuronal cells. The phosphorylation state of this kinase in synaptic terminals was shown to be regulated by membrane depolarization via calcineurin. This kinase forms heterodimers with leucine zipper containing transcription factors, such as cAMP responsive element binding protein (CREB) and MYC, and thus may play a regulatory role in PKA or retinoic acid induced neuronal differentiation.

== Interactions ==
MAP3K12 has been shown to interact with MAPK8IP1, MAP2K7 and MAPK8IP2.

== Role in development ==
MAP3K12, otherwise known as DLK, can initiate coordinated signalling cascades that culminate in the phosphorylation of C-Jun N-terminal kinases or JNK. Several experiments have implicated this interaction as having a role in the developing mammalian nervous system. For example, neuronal migration and axon growth are critical components of neuronal development. DLK null mice have defects in neuronal migration, hypoplasia of several different axonal tracts and reduced axon number in various areas of the brain such as the cingulum and internal capsule. In addition, inhibition of DLK or JNK delays radial migration and disrupts the formation of the neocortex in mice. Another important function of the developing mammalian nervous system is neuronal apoptosis. The absence of DLK also protects cultured mice sensory neurons from apoptosis that would normally be triggered by a lack of NGF. This, among other experiments, heavily implicates it as having a role in neuronal apoptosis.

DLK has several different interactions that contribute to mammalian nervous system development. For axon growth, DLK phosphorylates MAP2K4/7 which then phosphorylates JNK, activating it. In neuronal migration DLK phosphorylates MAP2K4/7 which phosphorylates JNK, and also interacts with JIP which then interacts with MAP2K4/7 and JNK. There is a similar interaction for neuronal apoptosis, where DLK phosphorylates JIP3 and MAP2K7, which both phosphorylate JNK. It is evident then that DLK interactions are a versatile and critical part of neuronal development in mammals.
