= SH3BP5 =

Protein-coding gene in the species Homo sapiens

Available structures
| PDB | Ortholog search: PDBe RCSB |
| PDB | List of PDB id codes 4H3B |

Identifiers
- Aliases: SH3BP5, SAB, SH3BP-5, SH3 domain binding protein 5
- External IDs: OMIM: 605612; MGI: 1344391; HomoloGene: 23450; GeneCards: SH3BP5; OMA:SH3BP5 - orthologs

Gene location (Human)
| Chr. | Chromosome 3 (human) |
| Band | 3p25.1 | Start | 15,254,353 bp |
| Band | 3p25.1 | End | 15,341,368 bp |

Gene location (Mouse)
| Chr. | Chromosome 14 (mouse) |
| Band | 14|14 B | Start | 31,081,837 bp |
| Band | 14|14 B | End | 31,158,035 bp |
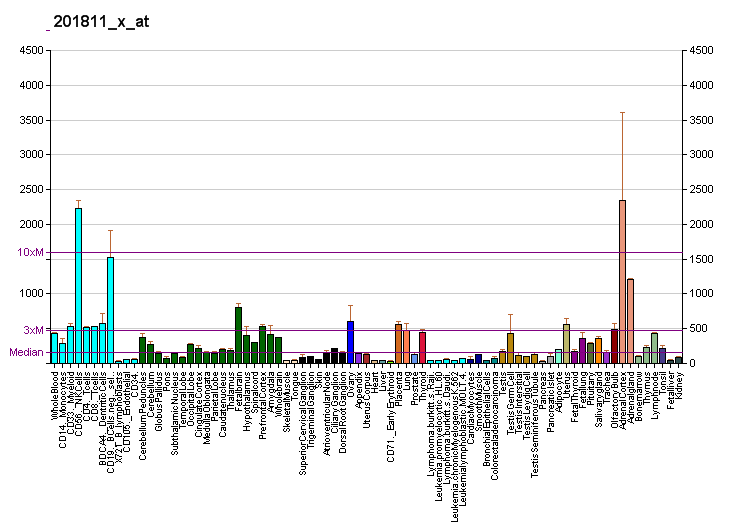

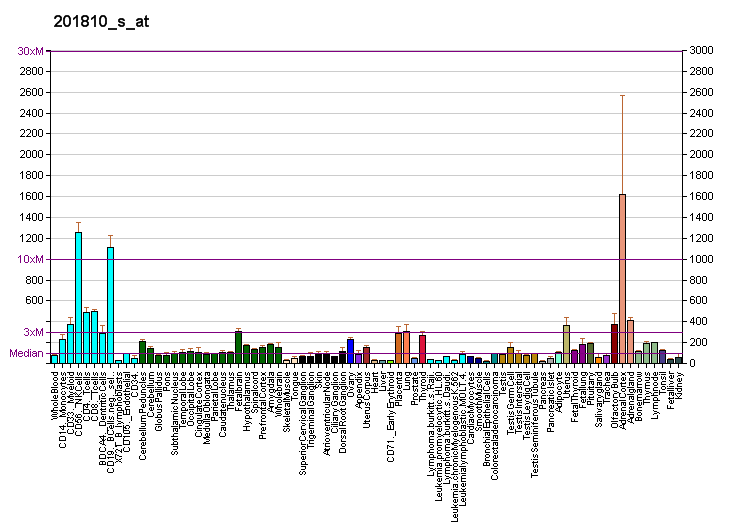
RNA expression pattern
| Bgee | Human / Mouse (ortholog); Top expressed in: endothelial cell; germinal epithelium; trigeminal ganglion; pericardium; visceral pleura; secondary oocyte; adrenal cortex; tendon of biceps brachii; left adrenal cortex; spinal ganglia / Top expressed in: stroma of bone marrow; granulocyte; endothelial cell of lymphatic vessel; dentate gyrus of hippocampal formation granule cell; barrel cortex; sexually immature organism; mesenteric lymph nodes; endocardial cushion; atrioventricular valve; saccule; More reference expression data |
| BioGPS | More reference expression data |
Gene ontology
| Molecular function | protein kinase inhibitor activity; protein binding; SH3 domain binding; guanyl-nucleotide exchange factor activity |
| Cellular component | cytoplasm; mitochondrion; nucleoplasm; nuclear body; cytoplasmic vesicle membrane; membrane; cytoplasmic vesicle |
| Biological process | signal transduction; negative regulation of protein tyrosine kinase activity; intracellular signal transduction; negative regulation of protein kinase activity |
Sources:Amigo / QuickGO
Orthologs
| Species | Human | Mouse |
| Entrez | 9467 | 24056 |
| Ensembl | ENSG00000131370 | ENSMUSG00000021892 |
| UniProt | O60239 | Q9Z131 |
| RefSeq (mRNA) | NM_001018009; NM_004844 | NM_011894; NM_001347585 |
| RefSeq (protein) | NP_001018009; NP_004835 | NP_001334514; NP_036024; NP_001391515; NP_001391516; NP_001391517 NP_001391518 |
| Location (UCSC) | Chr 3: 15.25 – 15.34 Mb | Chr 14: 31.08 – 31.16 Mb |
| PubMed search |
- Wikidata
| View/Edit Human | View/Edit Mouse |

SH3 domain-binding protein 5 is a protein that in humans is encoded by the SH3BP5 gene.

== Interactions ==
SH3BP5 has been shown to interact with Bruton's tyrosine kinase and MAPK8.

== Further reading a ==
- Win S, Than TA, Han D, Petrovic LM, Kaplowitz N (October 2011). "c-Jun N-terminal kinase (JNK)-dependent acute liver injury from acetaminophen or tumor necrosis factor (TNF) requires mitochondrial Sab protein expression in mice". The Journal of Biological Chemistry. 286 (40): 35071–35078. doi:10.1074/jbc.M111.276089. PMC 3186406. PMID 21844199.
- Win S, Than TA, Le BH, García-Ruiz C, Fernandez-Checa JC, Kaplowitz N (June 2015). "Sab (Sh3bp5) dependence of JNK mediated inhibition of mitochondrial respiration in palmitic acid induced hepatocyte lipotoxicity". Journal of Hepatology. 62 (6): 1367–1374. doi:10.1016/j.jhep.2015.01.032. PMC 4439305. PMID 25666017.
- Win S, Min RW, Zhang J, Kanel G, Wanken B, Chen Y, et al. (December 2021). "Hepatic Mitochondrial SAB Deletion or Knockdown Alleviates Diet-Induced Metabolic Syndrome, Steatohepatitis, and Hepatic Fibrosis". Hepatology. 74 (6): 3127–3145. doi:10.1002/hep.32083. PMC 8639630. PMID 34331779.
- Baba Y, Matsushita M, Matsuda Y, Inazawa J, Yamadori T, Hashimoto S, et al. (2000). "Assignment of SH3BP5/Sh3bp5 encoding sab, an SH3 domain-binding protein which preferentially associates with Bruton's tyrosine kinase, to human chromosome 1q43 and mouse chromosome 14B by in situ hybridization". Cytogenetics and Cell Genetics. 87 (3–4): 221–222. doi:10.1159/000015430. PMID 10702676. S2CID 41425074.
- Wiltshire C, Matsushita M, Tsukada S, Gillespie DA, May GH (November 2002). "A new c-Jun N-terminal kinase (JNK)-interacting protein, Sab (SH3BP5), associates with mitochondria". The Biochemical Journal. 367 (Pt 3): 577–585. doi:10.1042/BJ20020553. PMC 1222945. PMID 12167088.
- Brandenberger R, Wei H, Zhang S, Lei S, Murage J, Fisk GJ, et al. (June 2004). "Transcriptome characterization elucidates signaling networks that control human ES cell growth and differentiation". Nature Biotechnology. 22 (6): 707–716. doi:10.1038/nbt971. PMID 15146197. S2CID 27764390.
- Court NW, Kuo I, Quigley O, Bogoyevitch MA (June 2004). "Phosphorylation of the mitochondrial protein Sab by stress-activated protein kinase 3". Biochemical and Biophysical Research Communications. 319 (1): 130–137. doi:10.1016/j.bbrc.2004.04.148. PMID 15158451.
- Wiltshire C, Gillespie DA, May GH (December 2004). "Sab (SH3BP5), a novel mitochondria-localized JNK-interacting protein". Biochemical Society Transactions. 32 (Pt 6): 1075–1077. doi:10.1042/BST0321075. PMID 15506969.
- Beausoleil SA, Villén J, Gerber SA, Rush J, Gygi SP (October 2006). "A probability-based approach for high-throughput protein phosphorylation analysis and site localization". Nature Biotechnology. 24 (10): 1285–1292. doi:10.1038/nbt1240. PMID 16964243. S2CID 14294292.
