= C-Jun N-terminal kinases =

Chemical compounds

mitogen-activated protein kinase 8
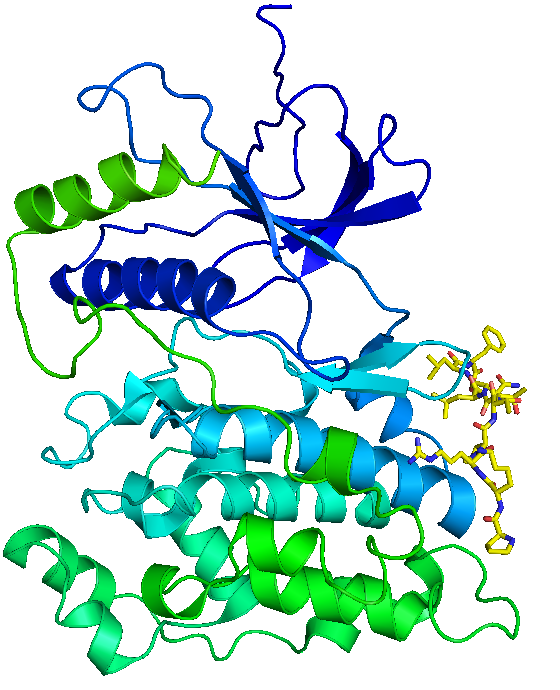

Identifiers
- Symbol: MAPK8
- Alt. symbols: JNK1, PRKM8
- NCBI gene: 5599
- HGNC: 6881
- OMIM: 601158
- RefSeq: NM_002750
- UniProt: P45983

Other data
- Locus: Chr. 10 q11.2
Search for
- Structures: Swiss-model
- Domains: InterPro

mitogen-activated protein kinase 9

Identifiers
- Symbol: MAPK9
- Alt. symbols: JNK2, PRKM9
- NCBI gene: 5601
- HGNC: 6886
- OMIM: 602896
- RefSeq: NM_002752
- UniProt: P45984

Other data
- Locus: Chr. 5 q35
Search for
- Structures: Swiss-model
- Domains: InterPro

mitogen-activated protein kinase 10

Identifiers
- Symbol: MAPK10
- Alt. symbols: JNK3, PRKM10
- NCBI gene: 5602
- HGNC: 6872
- OMIM: 602897
- RefSeq: NM_002753
- UniProt: P53779

Other data
- Locus: Chr. 4 q22-q23
Search for
- Structures: Swiss-model
- Domains: InterPro

c-Jun N-terminal kinases (JNKs), were originally identified as kinases that bind and phosphorylate c-Jun on Ser-63 and Ser-73 within its transcriptional activation domain. They belong to the mitogen-activated protein kinase family, and are responsive to stress stimuli, such as cytokines, ultraviolet irradiation, heat shock, and osmotic shock. They also play a role in T cell differentiation and the cellular apoptosis pathway. Activation occurs through a dual phosphorylation of threonine (Thr) and tyrosine (Tyr) residues within a Thr-Pro-Tyr motif located in kinase subdomain VIII. Activation is carried out by two MAP kinase kinases, MKK4 and MKK7, and JNK can be inactivated by Ser/Thr and Tyr protein phosphatases. It has been suggested that this signaling pathway contributes to inflammatory responses in mammals and insects.

== Isoforms ==
The c-Jun N-terminal kinases consist of ten isoforms derived from three genes: JNK1 (four isoforms), JNK2 (four isoforms) and JNK3 (two isoforms). Each gene is expressed as either 46 kDa or 55 kDa protein kinases, depending upon how the 3' coding region of the corresponding mRNA is processed. There have been no functional differences documented between the 46 kDa and the 55 kDa isoform, however, a second form of alternative splicing occurs within transcripts of JNK1 and JNK2, yielding JNK1-α, JNK2-α and JNK1-β and JNK2-β. Differences in interactions with protein substrates arise because of the mutually exclusive utilization of two exons within the kinase domain.

c-Jun N-terminal kinase isoforms have the following tissue distribution:

- JNK1 and JNK2 are found in all cells and tissues.
- JNK3 is found mainly in the brain, but is also found in the heart and the testes.

== Function ==
Inflammatory signals, changes in levels of reactive oxygen species, ultraviolet radiation, protein synthesis inhibitors, and a variety of stress stimuli can activate JNK. One way this activation may occur is through disruption of the conformation of sensitive protein phosphatase enzymes; specific phosphatases normally inhibit the activity of JNK itself and the activity of proteins linked to JNK activation.

JNKs can associate with scaffold proteins JNK interacting proteins (JIP) as well as their upstream kinases JNKK1 and JNKK2 following their activation.

JNK, by phosphorylation, modifies the activity of numerous proteins that reside at the mitochondria or act in the nucleus. Downstream molecules that are activated by JNK include c-Jun, ATF2, ELK1, SMAD4, p53 and HSF1. The downstream molecules that are inhibited by JNK activation include NFAT4, NFATC1 and STAT3. By activating and inhibiting other small molecules in this way, JNK activity regulates several important cellular functions including cell growth, differentiation, survival and apoptosis.

JNK1 is involved in apoptosis, neurodegeneration, cell differentiation and proliferation, inflammatory conditions and cytokine production mediated by AP-1 (activation protein 1) such as RANTES, IL-8 and GM-CSF.

Recently, JNK1 has been found to regulate Jun protein turnover by phosphorylation and activation of the ubiquitin ligase Itch.

Neurotrophin binding to p75NTR activates a JNK signaling pathway causing apoptosis of developing neurons. JNK, through a series of intermediates, activates p53 and p53 activates Bax which initiates apoptosis. TrkA can prevent p75NTR-mediated JNK pathway apoptosis. JNK can directly phosphorylate Bim-EL, a splicing isoform of Bcl-2 interacting mediator of cell death (Bim), which activates Bim-EL apoptotic activity. JNK activation is required for apoptosis but c-jun, a protein involved in the JNK pathway, is not always required.

== Roles in DNA repair ==
The packaging of eukaryotic DNA into chromatin presents a barrier to all DNA-based processes that require recruitment of enzymes to their sites of action. To allow repair of double-strand breaks in DNA, the chromatin must be remodeled. Chromatin relaxation occurs rapidly at the site of a DNA damage. In one of the earliest steps, JNK phosphorylates SIRT6 on serine 10 in response to double-strand breaks (DSBs) or other DNA damage, and this step is required for efficient repair of DSBs. Phosphorylation of SIRT6 on S10 facilitates the mobilization of SIRT6 to DNA damage sites, where SIRT6 then recruits and mono-phosphorylates poly (ADP-ribose) polymerase 1 (PARP1) at DNA break sites. Half maximum accumulation of PARP1 occurs within 1.6 seconds after the damage occurs. The chromatin remodeler Alc1 quickly attaches to the product of PARP1 action, a poly-ADP ribose chain, allowing half of the maximum chromatin relaxation, presumably due to action of Alc1, by 10 seconds. This allows recruitment of the DNA repair enzyme MRE11, to initiate DNA repair, within 13 seconds.

Removal of UV-induced DNA photoproducts, during transcription coupled nucleotide excision repair (TC-NER), depends on JNK phosphorylation of DGCR8 on serine 153. While DGCR8 is usually known to function in microRNA biogenesis, the microRNA-generating activity of DGCR8 is not required for DGCR8-dependent removal of UV-induced photoproducts. Nucleotide excision repair is also needed for repair of oxidative DNA damage due to hydrogen peroxide (H_{2}O_{2}), and DGCR8 depleted cells are sensitive to H_{2}O_{2}.

== In aging ==
In Drosophila, flies with mutations that augment JNK signaling accumulate less oxidative damage and live dramatically longer than wild-type flies.

In the tiny roundworm Caenorhabditis elegans, loss-of-function mutants of JNK-1 have a decreased life span, while amplified expression of wild-type JNK-1 extends life span by 40%. Worms with overexpressed JNK-1 also have significantly increased resistance to oxidative stress and other stresses.
