= MAPK8IP1 =

Protein-coding gene in the species Homo sapiens

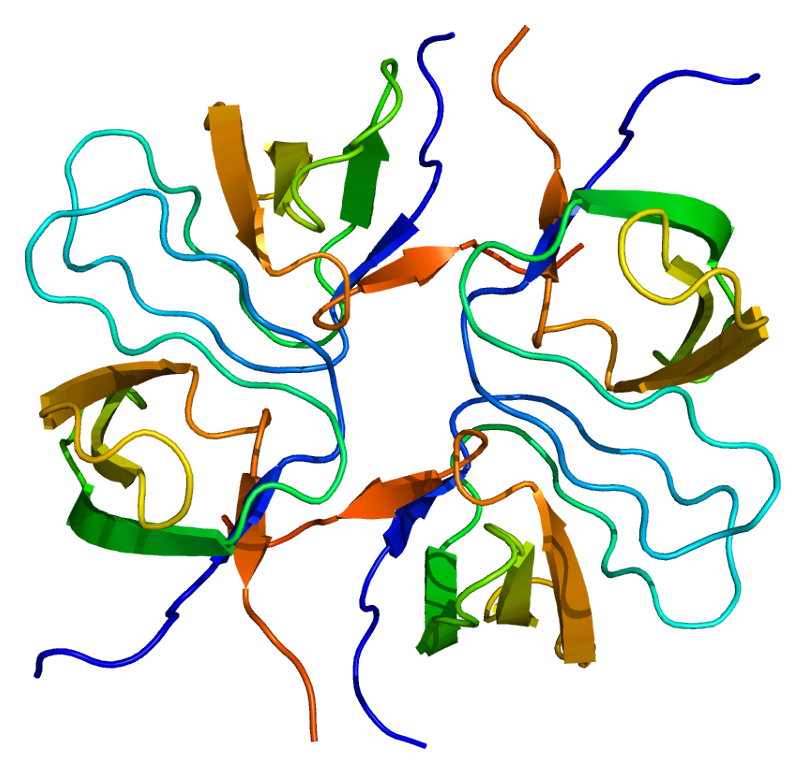

Identifiers
- Aliases: MAPK8IP1, IB1, JIP-1, JIP1, PRKM8IP, mitogen-activated protein kinase 8 interacting protein 1
- External IDs: OMIM: 604641; MGI: 1309464; GeneCards: MAPK8IP1
Available structures
PDB	Ortholog search: PDBe RCSB
PDB	List of PDB id codes 2G01, 2GMX, 2H96, 3OXI, 3PTG, 3VUD, 3VUG, 3VUH, 3VUI, 3VUK, 3VUL, 3VUM, 4E73, 4G1W, 4H39, 4HYS, 4HYU, 4IZY

Gene location (Human)
Chr.	Chromosome 11 (human)
Band	11p11.2	Start	45,885,651 bp
Band	11p11.2	End	45,906,465 bp

Gene location (Mouse)
Chr.	Chromosome 2 (mouse)
Band	2|2 E1	Start	92,214,021 bp
Band	2|2 E1	End	92,231,608 bp
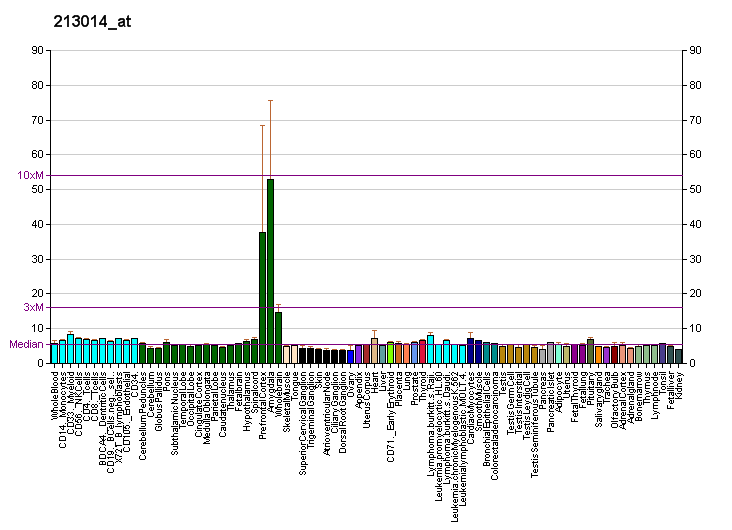

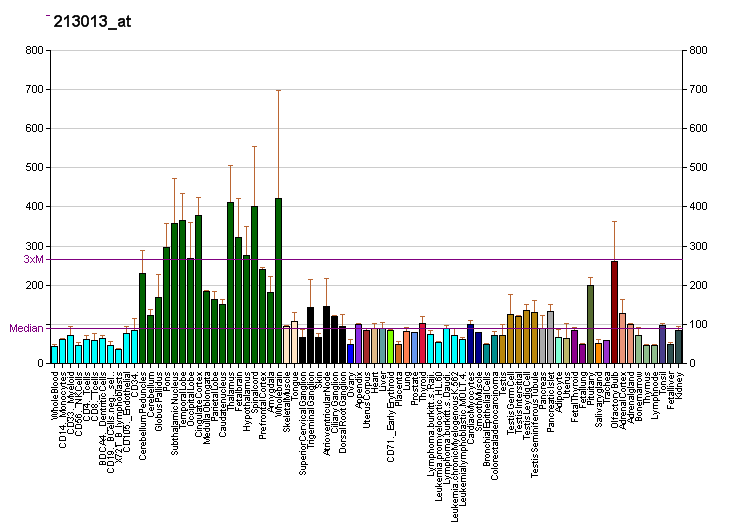
RNA expression pattern
Bgee	Human / Mouse (ortholog); Top expressed in: C1 segment; right frontal lobe; anterior pituitary; right hemisphere of cerebellum; tibial nerve; anterior cingulate cortex; prefrontal cortex; ventricular zone; Brodmann area 9; Brodmann area 10 / Top expressed in: superior frontal gyrus; primary visual cortex; entorhinal cortex; perirhinal cortex; cerebellar cortex; dentate gyrus of hippocampal formation granule cell; superior surface of tongue; gallbladder; dorsomedial hypothalamic nucleus; central gray substance of midbrain; More reference expression data
BioGPS	More reference expression data
Gene ontology
Molecular function	MAP-kinase scaffold activity; protein kinase inhibitor activity; protein binding; kinesin binding; protein kinase binding; JUN kinase binding; mitogen-activated protein kinase kinase binding; mitogen-activated protein kinase kinase kinase binding
Cellular component	cytoplasm; cell body; cytosol; dendritic growth cone; endoplasmic reticulum membrane; mitochondrial membranes; membrane; dentate gyrus mossy fiber; axonal growth cone; synapse; axon; dendrite; endoplasmic reticulum; mitochondrion; perinuclear region of cytoplasm; neuron projection; nucleus; plasma membrane
Biological process	regulation of transcription, DNA-templated; negative regulation of intrinsic apoptotic signaling pathway; negative regulation of apoptotic process; negative regulation of JNK cascade; regulation of JNK cascade; JUN phosphorylation; negative regulation of JUN kinase activity; vesicle-mediated transport; signal transduction; positive regulation of MAPK cascade; positive regulation of JNK cascade; regulation of CD8-positive, alpha-beta T cell proliferation
Sources:Amigo / QuickGO
Orthologs
Databases	NCBI: entry; OMA: entry
Species	Human	Mouse
Entrez	9479	19099
Ensembl	ENSG00000121653	ENSMUSG00000027223
UniProt	Q9UQF2	Q9WVI9
RefSeq (mRNA)	NM_005456	NM_001202445; NM_001202446; NM_011162
RefSeq (protein)	NP_005447	NP_001189374; NP_001189375; NP_035292
Location (UCSC)	Chr 11: 45.89 – 45.91 Mb	Chr 2: 92.21 – 92.23 Mb
PubMed search
- Wikidata
View/Edit Human	View/Edit Mouse

C-jun-amino-terminal kinase-interacting protein 1 is an enzyme that in humans is encoded by the MAPK8IP1 gene.

The protein encoded by this gene is a regulator of the pancreatic beta-cell function. It is highly similar to JIP-1, a mouse protein known to be a regulator of c-Jun amino-terminal kinase (Mapk8). This protein has been shown to prevent MAPK8 mediated activation of transcription factors, and decrease IL-1 beta and MAP kinase kinase 1 (MEKK1) induced apoptosis in pancreatic beta cells. This protein also functions as a DNA-binding transactivator of the glucose transporter GLUT2. RE1-silencing transcription factor (REST) is reported to repress the expression of this gene in insulin-secreting beta cells. This gene is found to be mutated in a type 2 diabetes family, and thus is thought to be a susceptibility gene for type 2 diabetes.

== Interactions ==
MAPK8IP1 has been shown to interact with MAP3K10, DUSP16, Mitogen-activated protein kinase 9, MAPK8, LRP2, LRP1, MAP3K12, MAP2K7, MAPK8IP2 and MAP3K11.
