= DUSP19 =

Protein-coding gene in the species Homo sapiens

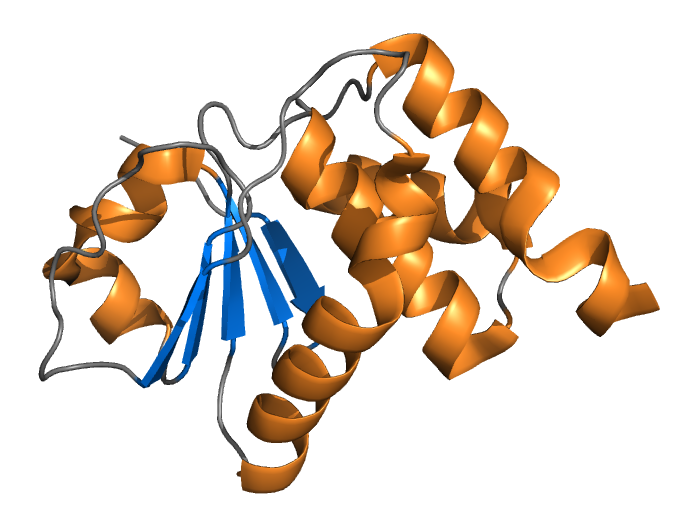

Identifiers
- Aliases: DUSP19, DUSP17, LMWDSP3, SKRP1, TS-DSP1, dual specificity phosphatase 19
- External IDs: OMIM: 611437; MGI: 1915332; GeneCards: DUSP19
Available structures
PDB	Ortholog search: PDBe RCSB
PDB	List of PDB id codes 3S4E, 4D3P, 4D3R, 4D3Q
Enzyme activity
EC #	BRENDA	ExPASy	KEGG	MetaCyc
3.1.3.16	↗	↗	↗	↗
3.1.3.48	↗	↗	↗	↗

Gene location (Human)
Chr.	Chromosome 2 (human)
Band	2q32.1	Start	183,078,559 bp
Band	2q32.1	End	183,100,008 bp

Gene location (Mouse)
Chr.	Chromosome 2 (mouse)
Band	2|2 C3	Start	80,447,389 bp
Band	2|2 C3	End	80,462,705 bp
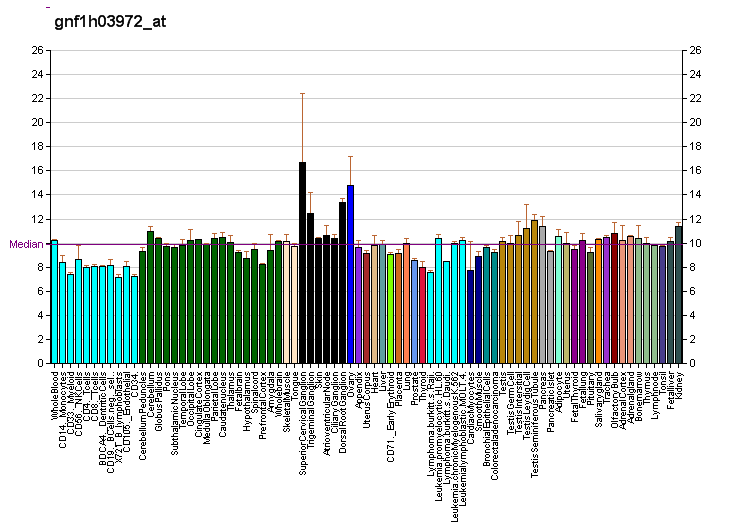
RNA expression pattern
Bgee	Human / Mouse (ortholog); Top expressed in: oocyte; secondary oocyte; buccal mucosa cell; gonad; bronchial epithelial cell; testicle; islet of Langerhans; Descending thoracic aorta; mucosa of paranasal sinus; ventricular zone / Top expressed in: medullary collecting duct; condyle; endocardial cushion; Paneth cell; lumbar subsegment of spinal cord; endothelial cell of lymphatic vessel; sternocleidomastoid muscle; fossa; right ventricle; digastric muscle; More reference expression data
BioGPS	More reference expression data
Gene ontology
Molecular function	phosphoprotein phosphatase activity; MAP-kinase scaffold activity; mitogen-activated protein kinase kinase kinase binding; phosphatase activity; protein kinase inhibitor activity; protein kinase activator activity; protein binding; protein tyrosine phosphatase activity; hydrolase activity; protein tyrosine/serine/threonine phosphatase activity; JUN kinase phosphatase activity
Cellular component	cytoplasm
Biological process	negative regulation of protein kinase activity; positive regulation of JUN kinase activity; protein dephosphorylation; positive regulation of JNK cascade; negative regulation of JNK cascade; peptidyl-tyrosine dephosphorylation; negative regulation of JUN kinase activity; positive regulation of MAPK cascade; positive regulation of protein kinase activity; dephosphorylation; activation of protein kinase activity; regulation of MAP kinase activity
Sources:Amigo / QuickGO
Orthologs
Databases	NCBI: entry; OMA: entry
Species	Human	Mouse
Entrez	142679	68082
Ensembl	ENSG00000162999	ENSMUSG00000027001
UniProt	Q8WTR2	Q8K4T5; Q99N12
RefSeq (mRNA)	NM_001142314; NM_080876; NM_001321519	NM_024438
RefSeq (protein)	NP_001135786; NP_001308448; NP_543152	NP_077758
Location (UCSC)	Chr 2: 183.08 – 183.1 Mb	Chr 2: 80.45 – 80.46 Mb
PubMed search
- Wikidata
View/Edit Human	View/Edit Mouse

Dual specificity protein phosphatase 19 is an enzyme that in humans is encoded by the DUSP19 gene.

== Interactions ==
DUSP19 has been shown to interact with ASK1 and MAP2K7.
