= Mitogen-activated protein kinase kinase =

Kinase enzyme

Identifiers
- EC no.: 2.7.12.2

Databases
- BRENDA: enzyme data
- ExPASy: NiceZyme view
- KEGG: enzyme entry
- MetaCyc: metabolic pathway
- Rhea: reactions
- PDB structures: RCSB PDB PDBe PDBsum
Search
- PMC: articles
- PubMed: articles
- NCBI: proteins

Mitogen-activated protein kinase kinase (also known as MAP2K, MEK, MAPKK) is a dual-specificity kinase enzyme which phosphorylates mitogen-activated protein kinase (MAPK).

MAP2K is classified as EC 2.7.12.2.

There are seven genes:

- MAP2K1 (a.k.a. MEK1)
- MAP2K2 (a.k.a. MEK2)
- MAP2K3 (a.k.a. MKK3)
- MAP2K4 (a.k.a. MKK4)
- MAP2K5 (a.k.a. MKK5)
- MAP2K6 (a.k.a. MKK6)
- MAP2K7 (a.k.a. MKK7)

The activators of p38 (MKK3 and MKK6), JNK (MKK4 and MKK7), and ERK (MEK1 and MEK2) define independent MAP kinase signal transduction pathways. The acronym MEK derives from MAPK/ERK Kinase.

== Role in melanoma ==
MEK is a member of the MAPK signaling cascade that is activated in melanoma. When MEK is inhibited, cell proliferation is blocked and apoptosis (controlled cell death) is induced.

== As a drug target ==
A number of MEK inhibitors (particularly dual MEK1/MEK2 inhibitors) have been developed to treat various types of cancers.

== See also ==
- Signal transduction
- MAP kinase
- MAP kinase kinase kinase
- MAP kinase kinase kinase kinase
