= ITCH =

Protein-coding gene in humans

Identifiers
- Aliases: ITCH, AIF4, AIP4, NAPP1, dJ468O1.1, ADMFD, itchy E3 ubiquitin protein ligase
- External IDs: OMIM: 606409; MGI: 1202301; GeneCards: ITCH
Available structures
PDB	Ortholog search: PDBe RCSB
PDB	List of PDB id codes 2DMV, 2KYK, 2NQ3, 2P4R, 2YSF, 3TUG, 4ROF, 5CQ2, 5DWS, 5DZD, 5C7M
Enzyme activity
EC #	BRENDA	ExPASy	KEGG	MetaCyc
2.3.2.26	↗	↗	↗	↗

Gene location (Human)
Chr.	Chromosome 20 (human)
Band	20q11.22	Start	34,363,241 bp
Band	20q11.22	End	34,540,748 bp

Gene location (Mouse)
Chr.	Chromosome 2 (mouse)
Band	2 H1|2 76.94 cM	Start	154,975,429 bp
Band	2 H1|2 76.94 cM	End	155,068,775 bp
RNA expression pattern
Bgee	Human / Mouse (ortholog); Top expressed in: sperm; Achilles tendon; sural nerve; epithelium of colon; islet of Langerhans; monocyte; internal globus pallidus; rectum; stromal cell of endometrium; corpus callosum / Top expressed in: Rostral migratory stream; genital tubercle; mesenteric lymph nodes; calvaria; hand; jejunum; tail of embryo; lacrimal gland; epithelium of small intestine; right kidney; More reference expression data
BioGPS	n/a
Gene ontology
Molecular function	CXCR chemokine receptor binding; protein binding; ribonucleoprotein complex binding; ubiquitin-like protein transferase activity; transferase activity; ligase activity; ubiquitin protein ligase activity; ubiquitin-protein transferase activity; ubiquitin-like protein ligase binding; arrestin family protein binding
Cellular component	cytosol; extracellular exosome; plasma membrane; membrane; nucleoplasm; nucleus; cell cortex; cytoplasmic vesicle; cytoplasm; early endosome; endosome; endosome membrane; early endosome membrane; protein-containing complex; intracellular membrane-bounded organelle
Biological process	Notch signaling pathway; protein K29-linked ubiquitination; immune system process; protein K63-linked ubiquitination; negative regulation of apoptotic process; defense response to virus; regulation of cell growth; viral entry into host cell; negative regulation of type I interferon production; inflammatory response; viral process; nucleotide-binding oligomerization domain containing signaling pathway; apoptotic process; innate immune response; protein polyubiquitination; positive regulation of T cell anergy; ubiquitin-dependent protein catabolic process; negative regulation of NF-kappaB transcription factor activity; positive regulation of protein catabolic process; negative regulation of JNK cascade; negative regulation of alpha-beta T cell proliferation; negative regulation of defense response to virus; protein K48-linked ubiquitination; regulation of protein deubiquitination; proteasome-mediated ubiquitin-dependent protein catabolic process; regulation of hematopoietic stem cell differentiation; protein ubiquitination; protein autoubiquitination; positive regulation of receptor catabolic process
Sources:Amigo / QuickGO
Orthologs
Databases	NCBI: entry; OMA: entry
Species	Human	Mouse
Entrez	83737	16396
Ensembl	ENSG00000078747	ENSMUSG00000027598
UniProt	Q96J02	Q8C863
RefSeq (mRNA)	NM_001257137; NM_001257138; NM_031483; NM_001324197; NM_001324198	NM_001243712; NM_008395
RefSeq (protein)	NP_001244066; NP_001244067; NP_001311126; NP_001311127; NP_113671	NP_001230641; NP_032421
Location (UCSC)	Chr 20: 34.36 – 34.54 Mb	Chr 2: 154.98 – 155.07 Mb
PubMed search
- Wikidata
View/Edit Human	View/Edit Mouse

Itchy E3 ubiquitin protein ligase is a protein that in humans is encoded by the gene ITCH. It is a HECT domain–containing E3 ubiquitin ligase, whose name comes from it being ablated in non-agouti-lethal 18H (a.k.a. Itchy) mice. Itchy mice develop a severe immunological phenotype after birth that includes hyperplasia of lymphoid and hematopoietic cells, and stomach and lung inflammation. In humans ITCH deficiency causes altered physical growth, craniofacial morphology defects, defective muscle development, and aberrant immune system function. The ITCH gene is located on chromosome 20 in humans. ITCH contains a C2 domain, proline-rich region, WW domains, HECT domain, and multiple amino acids that are phosphorylated and ubiquitinated.

== Regulation by phosphorylation ==
ITCH is regulated by MAPK8. MAPK8 regulates JUNB protein turnover by MAPK8-dependent phosphorylation of ITCH and a subsequent conformational change in ITCH. This mechanism is discrete from the direct activation of Jun family transcription factors by direct phosphorylation. ITCH serves as a paradigm for our understanding of the regulation of the ubiquitylation machinery by direct protein phosphorylation of its components. Importantly, this regulatory process controls the balance of Th2 cytokine secretion by negatively regulating JUNB levels and Interleukin 4 transcription.

MAPK8 regulates JUNB protein turnover by the phosphorylation of ITCH and a conformational change. Importantly, this regulatory process controls the balance of T helper 2 cytokine production by negatively regulating JUNB turnover and Interleukin 4 transcription.

== Interaction partners ==
Itch has been shown to interact with a number of proteins, including:

- CXCR4,
- c-Jun,
- MAP2K4,
- MAP3K1,
- MAP3K7,
- MAPK8,
- N4BP1,
- NOTCH1,
- TP63, and
- TP73.
