= MAPK8 =

Protein-coding gene in the species Homo sapiens

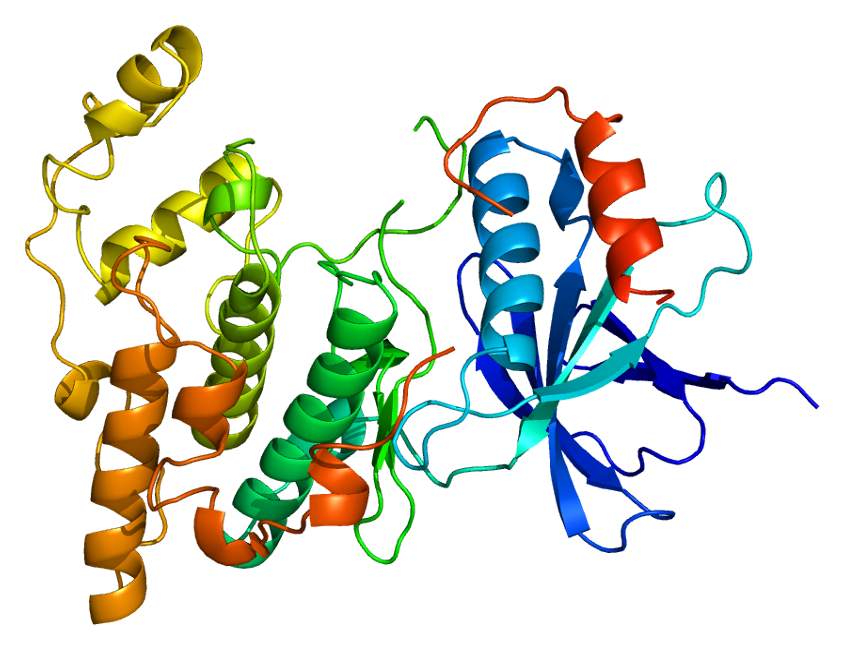

Identifiers
- Aliases: MAPK8, Mapk8, AI849689, JNK, JNK1, Prkm8, SAPK1, JNK-46, JNK1A2, JNK21B1/2, SAPK1c, mitogen-activated protein kinase 8
- External IDs: OMIM: 601158; MGI: 1346861; GeneCards: MAPK8
Available structures
PDB	Ortholog search: PDBe RCSB
PDB	List of PDB id codes 1UKH, 1UKI, 2G01, 2GMX, 2H96, 2NO3, 2XRW, 2XS0, 3ELJ, 3O17, 3O2M, 3PZE, 3V3V, 3VUD, 3VUG, 3VUH, 3VUI, 3VUK, 3VUL, 3VUM, 4AWI, 4E73, 4G1W, 4HYS, 4HYU, 4IZY, 4L7F, 4QTD, 4UX9, 4YR8
Enzyme activity
EC #	BRENDA	ExPASy	KEGG	MetaCyc
2.7.11.24	↗	↗	↗	↗

Gene location (Human)
Chr.	Chromosome 10 (human)
Band	10q11.22	Start	48,306,639 bp
Band	10q11.22	End	48,439,360 bp

Gene location (Mouse)
Chr.	Chromosome 14 (mouse)
Band	14|14 B	Start	33,099,855 bp
Band	14|14 B	End	33,169,115 bp
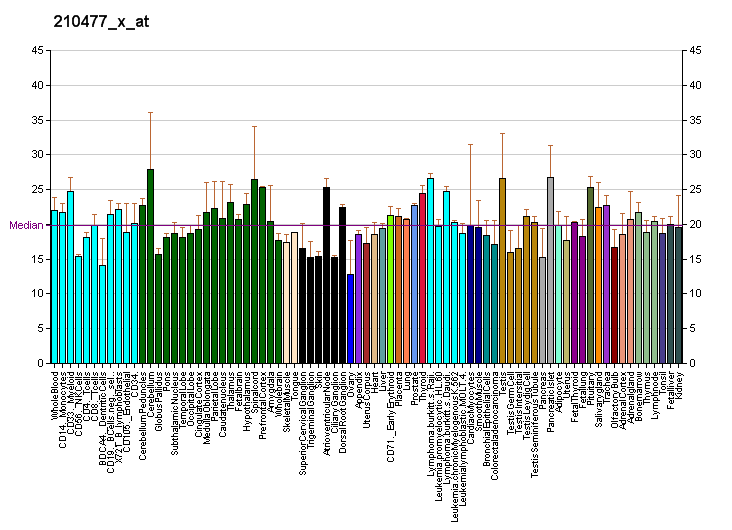

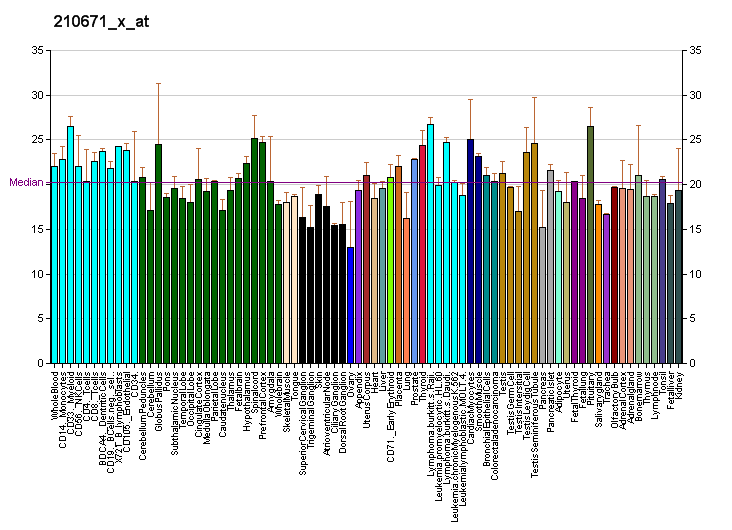
RNA expression pattern
Bgee	Human / Mouse (ortholog); Top expressed in: ganglionic eminence; tendon of biceps brachii; Achilles tendon; stromal cell of endometrium; buccal mucosa cell; ventricular zone; islet of Langerhans; internal globus pallidus; gallbladder; epithelium of colon / Top expressed in: zygote; secondary oocyte; primary oocyte; barrel cortex; superior cervical ganglion; ganglionic eminence; perirhinal cortex; visual cortex; genital tubercle; piriform cortex; More reference expression data
BioGPS	More reference expression data
Gene ontology
Molecular function	transferase activity; nucleotide binding; protein kinase activity; MAP kinase activity; histone deacetylase binding; histone deacetylase regulator activity; protein serine/threonine kinase activity; protein binding; enzyme binding; ATP binding; JUN kinase activity; kinase activity
Cellular component	cytosol; nucleoplasm; nucleus; mitochondrion; cytoplasm; neuron projection; axon; basal dendrite
Biological process	phosphorylation; rhythmic process; response to stress; negative regulation of apoptotic process; negative regulation of protein binding; regulation of protein localization; Fc-epsilon receptor signaling pathway; JNK cascade; cellular response to mechanical stimulus; positive regulation of protein insertion into mitochondrial membrane involved in apoptotic signaling pathway; positive regulation of gene expression; JUN phosphorylation; regulation of DNA-binding transcription factor activity; peptidyl-serine phosphorylation; regulation of circadian rhythm; positive regulation of deacetylase activity; peptidyl-threonine phosphorylation; positive regulation of cyclase activity; cellular response to lipopolysaccharide; response to UV; regulation of macroautophagy; regulation of histone deacetylation; positive regulation of apoptotic process; neuron development; protein phosphorylation; cellular response to amino acid starvation; cellular response to reactive oxygen species; stress-activated MAPK cascade; cellular response to cadmium ion; regulation of DNA replication origin binding; response to mechanical stimulus; regulation of gene expression; intracellular signal transduction; cellular response to organic substance; cellular response to cytokine stimulus
Sources:Amigo / QuickGO
Orthologs
Databases	NCBI: entry; OMA: entry
Species	Human	Mouse
Entrez	5599	26419
Ensembl	ENSG00000107643	ENSMUSG00000021936
UniProt	P45983	Q91Y86
RefSeq (mRNA)	NM_001278547; NM_001278548; NM_002750; NM_139046; NM_139049 NM_001323302; NM_001323320; NM_001323321; NM_001323322; NM_001323323; NM_001323324; NM_001323325; NM_001323326; NM_001323327; NM_001323328; NM_001323329; NM_001323330; NM_001323331	NM_001310452; NM_001310453; NM_001310454; NM_016700
RefSeq (protein)	NP_001265476; NP_001265477; NP_001310231; NP_001310249; NP_001310250 NP_001310251; NP_001310252; NP_001310253; NP_001310254; NP_001310255; NP_001310256; NP_001310257; NP_001310258; NP_001310259; NP_001310260; NP_620634; NP_620637	NP_001297381; NP_001297382; NP_001297383; NP_057909
Location (UCSC)	Chr 10: 48.31 – 48.44 Mb	Chr 14: 33.1 – 33.17 Mb
PubMed search
- Wikidata
View/Edit Human	View/Edit Mouse

Mitogen-activated protein kinase 8 (also known as JNK1) is a ubiquitous enzyme that in humans is encoded by the MAPK8 gene.

== Function ==
The protein encoded by this gene is a member of the MAP kinase and JNK family. MAP kinases act as an integration point for multiple biochemical signals, and are involved in a wide variety of cellular processes such as proliferation, differentiation, transcription regulation and development. This kinase is activated by various cell stimuli, and targets specific transcription factors, and thus mediates immediate-early gene expression in response to cell stimuli. The activation of this kinase by tumor-necrosis factor alpha (TNF-alpha) is found to be required for TNF-alpha-induced apoptosis. This kinase is also involved in UV radiation-induced apoptosis, which is thought to be related to the cytochrome c-mediated cell death pathway. Studies of the mouse counterpart of this gene suggested that this kinase play a key role in T cell proliferation, apoptosis and differentiation. Four alternately spliced transcript variants encoding distinct isoforms have been reported. MAPK8 contains multiple amino acid sites that are phosphorylated and ubiquitinated.

== Interactions ==
MAPK8 has been shown to interact with:

- Activating transcription factor 2,
- C-jun,
- CRK,
- DUSP10,
- DUSP1,
- GSTP1,
- IRS1,
- ITCH,
- MAP2K4,
- MAP2K7,
- MAP3K1
- MAP3K2,
- MAPK8IP1,
- MAPK8IP3,
- Myc,
- REL,
- SH3BP5, and
- SPIB.
