= ASK1 =

Protein found in humans

MAP3K5
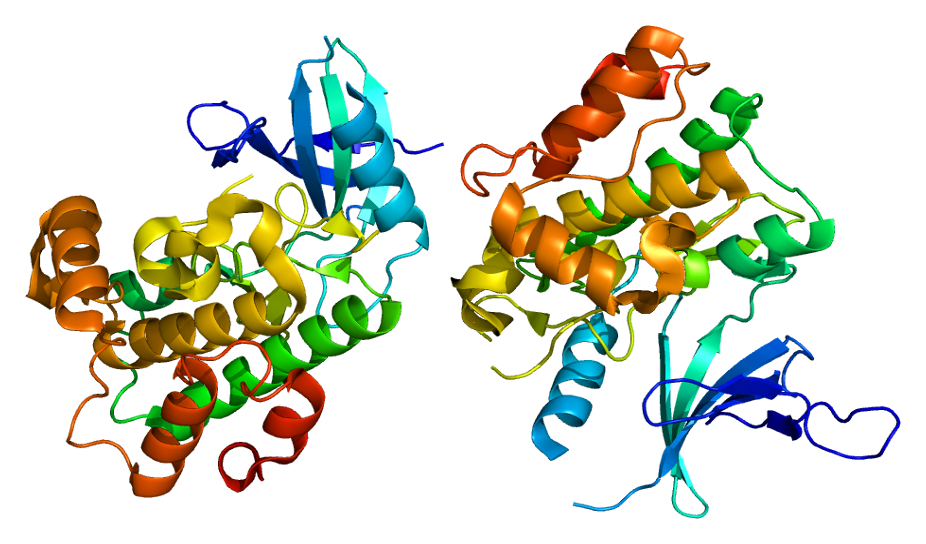

Identifiers
- Aliases: MAP3K5, ASK1, MAPKKK5, MEKK5, mitogen-activated protein kinase kinase kinase 5
- External IDs: OMIM: 602448; MGI: 1346876; GeneCards: MAP3K5
Available structures
PDB	Ortholog search: PDBe RCSB
PDB	List of PDB id codes 2CLQ, 3VW6, 4BF2, 4BHN, 4BIB, 4BIC, 4BID, 4BIE
Enzyme activity
EC #	BRENDA	ExPASy	KEGG	MetaCyc
2.7.11.25	↗	↗	↗	↗

Gene location (Human)
Chr.	Chromosome 6 (human)
Band	6q23.3	Start	136,557,046 bp
Band	6q23.3	End	136,792,477 bp

Gene location (Mouse)
Chr.	Chromosome 10 (mouse)
Band	10|10 A3	Start	19,810,218 bp
Band	10|10 A3	End	20,018,499 bp
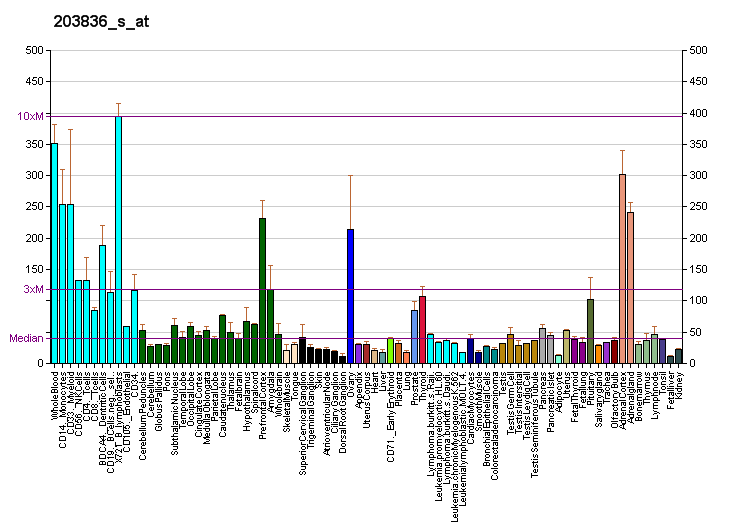

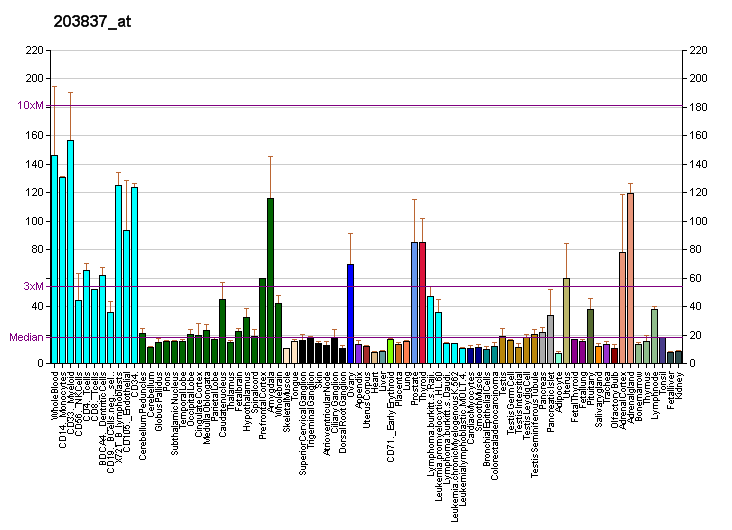
RNA expression pattern
Bgee	Human / Mouse (ortholog); Top expressed in: endothelial cell; Brodmann area 23; decidua; pancreatic ductal cell; adrenal cortex; left adrenal gland; right adrenal gland; left adrenal cortex; right adrenal cortex; dorsal motor nucleus of vagus nerve / Top expressed in: ciliary body; cumulus cell; pineal gland; retinal pigment epithelium; hair follicle; granulocyte; iris; transitional epithelium of urinary bladder; ascending aorta; vestibular membrane of cochlear duct; More reference expression data
BioGPS	More reference expression data
Gene ontology
Molecular function	transferase activity; protein kinase activity; nucleotide binding; protein homodimerization activity; metal ion binding; kinase activity; protein binding; protein phosphatase binding; MAP kinase kinase kinase activity; ATP binding; protein kinase binding; magnesium ion binding; protein serine/threonine kinase activity; protein domain specific binding; identical protein binding
Cellular component	cytoplasm; protein kinase complex; endoplasmic reticulum; IRE1-TRAF2-ASK1 complex; cytosol; external side of plasma membrane; protein-containing complex
Biological process	intrinsic apoptotic signaling pathway in response to oxidative stress; positive regulation of protein phosphorylation; phosphorylation; immune system process; regulation of cell death; positive regulation of neuron death; positive regulation of JNK cascade; response to endoplasmic reticulum stress; cellular response to reactive nitrogen species; MAPK cascade; protein phosphorylation; JNK cascade; positive regulation of cysteine-type endopeptidase activity involved in apoptotic process; intrinsic apoptotic signaling pathway in response to endoplasmic reticulum stress; response to ischemia; positive regulation of myoblast differentiation; positive regulation of apoptotic process; apoptotic signaling pathway; p38MAPK cascade; programmed necrotic cell death; innate immune response; viral process; cellular response to hydrogen peroxide; apoptotic process; cellular response to tumor necrosis factor; positive regulation of cardiac muscle cell apoptotic process; positive regulation of p38MAPK cascade; wound healing; positive regulation of JUN kinase activity; positive regulation of vascular associated smooth muscle cell proliferation; endothelial cell apoptotic process; cellular response to amino acid starvation; positive regulation of transcription, DNA-templated; stress-activated MAPK cascade
Sources:Amigo / QuickGO
Orthologs
Databases	NCBI: entry; OMA: entry
Species	Human	Mouse
Entrez	4217	26408
Ensembl	ENSG00000197442	ENSMUSG00000071369
UniProt	Q99683	O35099
RefSeq (mRNA)	NM_005923	NM_008580
RefSeq (protein)	NP_005914	NP_032606
Location (UCSC)	Chr 6: 136.56 – 136.79 Mb	Chr 10: 19.81 – 20.02 Mb
PubMed search
- Wikidata
View/Edit Human	View/Edit Mouse

Apoptosis signal-regulating kinase 1 (ASK1) also known as mitogen-activated protein kinase kinase kinase 5 (MAP3K5) is a member of MAP kinase family and as such a part of mitogen-activated protein kinase pathway. It activates c-Jun N-terminal kinase (JNK) and p38 mitogen-activated protein kinases in a Raf-independent fashion in response to an array of stresses such as oxidative stress, endoplasmic reticulum stress and calcium influx. ASK1 has been found to be involved in cancer, diabetes, rheumatoid arthritis, cardiovascular and neurodegenerative diseases.

MAP3K5 gene coding for the protein is located on chromosome 6 at locus 6q22.33. and the transcribed protein contains 1,374 amino acids with 11 kinase subdomains. Northern blot analysis shows that MAP3K5 transcript is abundant in human heart and pancreas.

== Mechanism of activation ==
Under nonstress conditions ASK1 is oligomerized (a requirement for its activation) through its C-terminal coiled-coil domain (CCC), but remains in an inactive form by the suppressive effect of reduced thioredoxin (Trx) and calcium and integrin binding protein 1 (CIB1). Trx inhibits ASK1 kinase activity by direct binding to its N-terminal coiled-coil domain (NCC). Trx and CIB1 regulate ASK1 activation in a redox- or calcium- sensitive manner, respectively. Both appear to compete with TNF-α receptor-associated factor 2 (TRAF2), an ASK1 activator. TRAF2 and TRAF6 are then recruited to ASK1 to form a larger molecular mass complex. Subsequently, ASK1 forms homo-oligomeric interactions not only through the CCC, but also the NCC, which leads to full activation of ASK1 through autophosphorylation at threonine 845.

ASK1 gene transcription can be induced by inflammatory cytokines such as IL-1 and TNF-α through the activation of the NF-kb protein RelA. Interestingly, TNF-α is also able to stabilize the ASK1 protein through deubiquitination. Thus, unlike other members of the mitogen-activated protein kinase family, the regulation of ASK1 expression is transcriptional as well as post-transcriptional.

== Interactions ==
ASK1 has been shown to interact with:

- C-Raf,
- CDC25A,
- DAXX,
- DUSP19,
- EIF2AK2,
- GADD45B,
- HSPA1A,
- MAP2K6,
- MAP3K7 and
- MAPK8IP3,
- PDCD6,
- PPP5C,
- RB1CC1,
- TRAF2,
- TRAF5, and
- TRAF6.
