= MAPK8IP3 =

Protein-coding gene in the species Homo sapiens

Available structures
PDB	Ortholog search: PDBe RCSB
PDB	List of PDB id codes 4PXJ

Identifiers
- Aliases: MAPK8IP3, JIP3, JSAP1, SYD2, syd, JIP-3, mitogen-activated protein kinase 8 interacting protein 3
- External IDs: OMIM: 605431; MGI: 1353598; HomoloGene: 22790; GeneCards: MAPK8IP3; OMA:MAPK8IP3 - orthologs

Gene location (Human)
Chr.	Chromosome 16 (human)
Band	16p13.3	Start	1,706,183 bp
Band	16p13.3	End	1,770,317 bp

Gene location (Mouse)
Chr.	Chromosome 17 (mouse)
Band	17 A3.3|17 12.53 cM	Start	25,111,127 bp
Band	17 A3.3|17 12.53 cM	End	25,155,951 bp
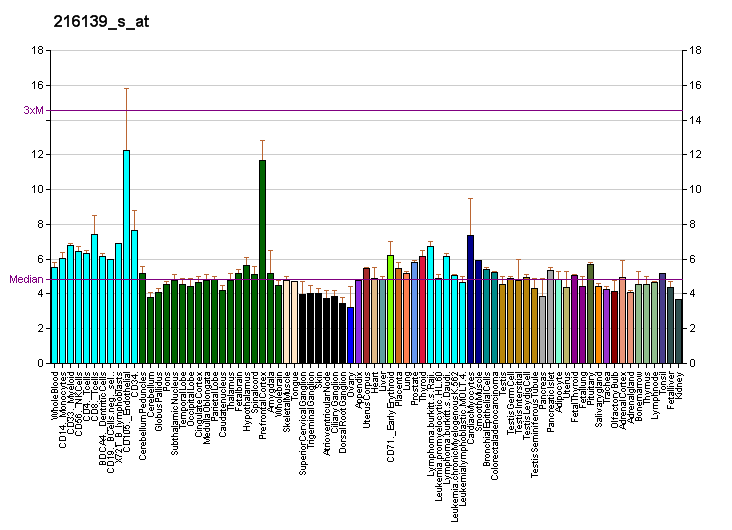

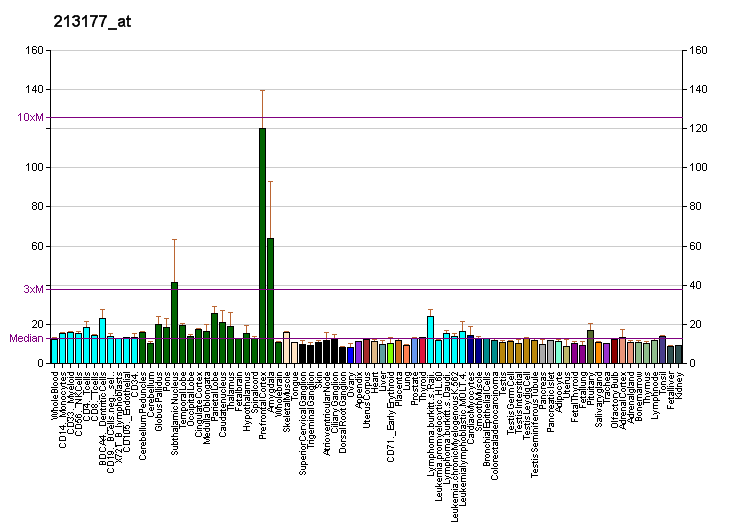

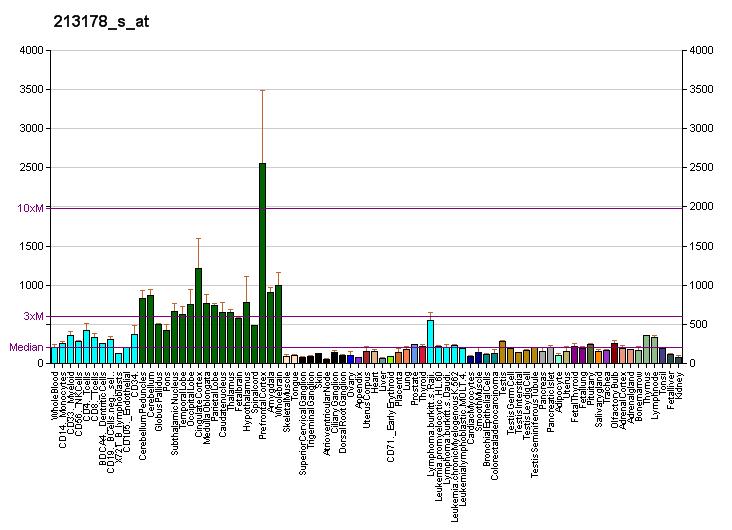
RNA expression pattern
Bgee	Human / Mouse (ortholog); Top expressed in: right hemisphere of cerebellum; right frontal lobe; anterior pituitary; prefrontal cortex; granulocyte; sural nerve; cingulate gyrus; left ovary; anterior cingulate cortex; right ovary / Top expressed in: dentate gyrus of hippocampal formation granule cell; superior frontal gyrus; neural layer of retina; primary visual cortex; perirhinal cortex; entorhinal cortex; central gray substance of midbrain; cerebellar cortex; superior colliculus; CA3 field; More reference expression data
BioGPS	More reference expression data
Gene ontology
Molecular function	signaling receptor complex adaptor activity; protein binding; MAP-kinase scaffold activity; JUN kinase binding; kinesin binding
Cellular component	cytoplasm; Golgi membrane; axon; dendrite; cell body; perinuclear region of cytoplasm; axon cytoplasm; Golgi apparatus; growth cone; cytoplasmic vesicle; cell projection
Biological process	vesicle-mediated transport; regulation of JNK cascade; axon regeneration; axon development; anterograde axonal protein transport
Sources:Amigo / QuickGO
Orthologs
Species	Human	Mouse
Entrez	23162	30957
Ensembl	ENSG00000138834	ENSMUSG00000024163
UniProt	Q9UPT6	Q9ESN9
RefSeq (mRNA)	NM_001040439; NM_015133; NM_001318852	NM_001163447; NM_001163448; NM_001163449; NM_001163450; NM_001163451 NM_001163453; NM_013931
RefSeq (protein)	NP_001035529; NP_001305781; NP_055948	NP_001156919; NP_001156920; NP_001156921; NP_001156922; NP_001156923 NP_001156925; NP_038959
Location (UCSC)	Chr 16: 1.71 – 1.77 Mb	Chr 17: 25.11 – 25.16 Mb
PubMed search
- Wikidata
View/Edit Human	View/Edit Mouse

C-jun-amino-terminal kinase-interacting protein 3 is an enzyme that in humans is encoded by the MAPK8IP3 gene.

The protein encoded by this gene shares similarity with the product of Drosophila syd gene, required for the functional interaction of kinesin I with axonal cargo. Studies of the similar gene in mouse suggested that this protein may interact with and regulate the activity of numerous protein kinases of the JNK signaling pathway, and thus function as a scaffold protein in neuronal cells. The C. elegans counterpart of this gene is found to regulate synaptic vesicle transport, possibly by integrating JNK signaling and kinesin-1 transport. Several alternatively spliced transcript variants of this gene have been described, but the full-length nature of some of these variants has not been determined.

== Interactions ==
MAPK8IP3 has been shown to interact with ASK1, C-Raf, PTK2, MAPK10, Mitogen-activated protein kinase 9, MAPK8, MAP2K1, KLC2, MAP2K7, KLC1, MAPK8IP2 and MAP2K4.
