= MAPK8IP2 =

Protein-coding gene in the species Homo sapiens

Identifiers
- Aliases: MAPK8IP2, IB-2, IB2, JIP2, PRKM8IPL, mitogen-activated protein kinase 8 interacting protein 2
- External IDs: OMIM: 607755; MGI: 1926555; GeneCards: MAPK8IP2

Gene location (Human)
Chr.	Chromosome 22 (human)
Band	22q13.33	Start	50,600,793 bp
Band	22q13.33	End	50,613,981 bp

Gene location (Mouse)
Chr.	Chromosome 15 (mouse)
Band	15|15 E3	Start	89,338,116 bp
Band	15|15 E3	End	89,348,671 bp
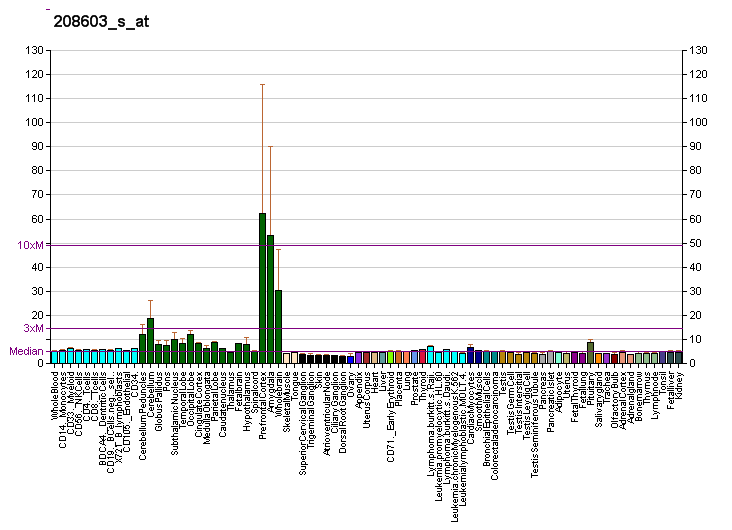

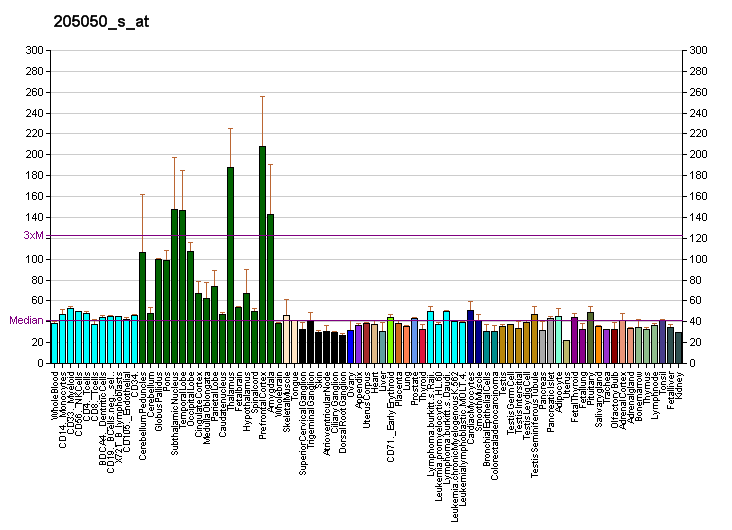
RNA expression pattern
Bgee	Human / Mouse (ortholog); Top expressed in: Brodmann area 10; right hemisphere of cerebellum; right frontal lobe; paraflocculus of cerebellum; amygdala; frontal pole; cingulate gyrus; anterior cingulate cortex; dorsolateral prefrontal cortex; Brodmann area 9 / Top expressed in: supraoptic nucleus; central gray substance of midbrain; dentate gyrus of hippocampal formation granule cell; visual cortex; pontine nuclei; primary visual cortex; facial motor nucleus; anterior horn of spinal cord; nucleus of stria terminalis; motor neuron; More reference expression data
BioGPS	More reference expression data
Gene ontology
Molecular function	amyloid-beta binding; structural molecule activity; protein kinase activator activity; protein binding; kinesin binding; protein kinase binding; MAP-kinase scaffold activity; protein-containing complex binding
Cellular component	cytoplasm; soma; intracellular anatomical structure; postsynaptic density; protein-containing complex
Biological process	dendrite morphogenesis; regulation of signaling receptor activity; signal complex assembly; mating behavior; behavioral fear response; MAPK cascade; regulation of AMPA receptor activity; non-associative learning; regulation of NMDA receptor activity; JNK cascade; regulation of JNK cascade; excitatory postsynaptic potential; social behavior; regulation of synaptic transmission, glutamatergic; positive regulation of stress-activated MAPK cascade; activation of protein kinase activity; negative regulation of apoptotic signaling pathway
Sources:Amigo / QuickGO
Orthologs
Databases	NCBI: entry; OMA: entry
Species	Human	Mouse
Entrez	23542	60597
Ensembl	ENSG00000008735	ENSMUSG00000022619
UniProt	Q13387	Q9ERE9
RefSeq (mRNA)	NM_012324; NM_016431; NM_139124	NM_021921
RefSeq (protein)	NP_036456	NP_068740
Location (UCSC)	Chr 22: 50.6 – 50.61 Mb	Chr 15: 89.34 – 89.35 Mb
PubMed search
- Wikidata
View/Edit Human	View/Edit Mouse

C-jun-amino-terminal kinase-interacting protein 2 is a protein or the name of the gene that encodes it. The gene is also known as Islet-Brain-2 (IB2).

This protein is highly expressed in the brain and is almost always deleted in Phelan-McDermid syndrome (PMS). MAPK8IP2 appears to regulate the ratio of AMPA receptors to NMDA receptors at glutamate synapses, and thus may be an important contributor to the intellectual dysfunction and related neurological manifestations characteristic of PMS.

The protein encoded by this gene is closely related to MAPK8IP1/IB1/JIP-1, a scaffold protein that is involved in the c-Jun amino-terminal kinase signaling pathway. This protein is expressed in brain and pancreatic cells. It has been shown to interact with, and regulate the activity of MAPK8/JNK1, and MAP2K7/MKK7 kinases. This protein thus is thought to function as a regulator of signal transduction by protein kinase cascade in brain and pancreatic beta-cells. Alternatively spliced transcript variants encoding distinct isoforms have been reported for this gene.

== Interactions ==
MAPK8IP2 has been shown to interact with MAP3K10, Mitogen-activated protein kinase 9, LRP2, LRP1, MAPK8IP3, MAP3K12, MAPK8IP1, MAP2K7 and MAP3K11.
