= MAP3K10 =

Protein-coding gene in the species Homo sapiens

Identifiers
- Aliases: MAP3K10, MEKK10, MLK2, MST, mitogen-activated protein kinase kinase kinase 10
- External IDs: OMIM: 600137; MGI: 1346879; GeneCards: MAP3K10
Available structures
PDB	Ortholog search: PDBe RCSB
PDB	List of PDB id codes 2RF0
Enzyme activity
EC #	BRENDA	ExPASy	KEGG	MetaCyc
2.7.11.25	↗	↗	↗	↗

Gene location (Human)
Chr.	Chromosome 19 (human)
Band	19q13.2	Start	40,191,426 bp
Band	19q13.2	End	40,215,575 bp

Gene location (Mouse)
Chr.	Chromosome 7 (mouse)
Band	7|7 A3	Start	27,355,800 bp
Band	7|7 A3	End	27,374,023 bp
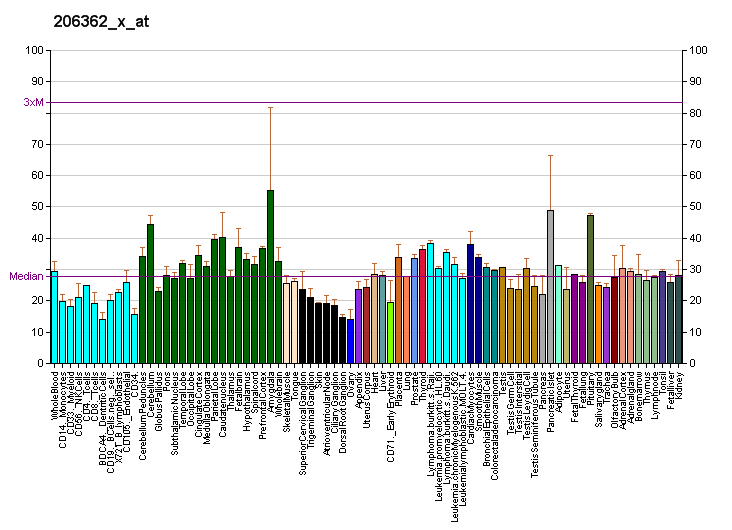
RNA expression pattern
Bgee	Human / Mouse (ortholog); Top expressed in: right frontal lobe; prefrontal cortex; cingulate gyrus; anterior cingulate cortex; amygdala; beta cell; nucleus accumbens; putamen; Brodmann area 9; right hemisphere of cerebellum / Top expressed in: superior frontal gyrus; primary visual cortex; dentate gyrus of hippocampal formation granule cell; muscle of thigh; ventricular zone; neural layer of retina; cerebellar cortex; spermatocyte; ganglionic eminence; ascending aorta; More reference expression data
BioGPS	More reference expression data
Gene ontology
Molecular function	transferase activity; protein kinase activity; nucleotide binding; protein homodimerization activity; transcription corepressor activity; kinase activity; protein serine/threonine kinase activity; bHLH transcription factor binding; ATP binding; MAP kinase kinase kinase activity; JUN kinase kinase kinase activity
Cellular component	cytoplasm; intracellular anatomical structure
Biological process	phosphorylation; positive regulation of JUN kinase activity; cell death; positive regulation of JNK cascade; negative regulation of DNA-binding transcription factor activity; protein phosphorylation; JNK cascade; peptidyl-serine phosphorylation; protein autophosphorylation; smoothened signaling pathway; peptidyl-threonine phosphorylation; negative regulation of transcription, DNA-templated; signal transduction; apoptotic process; positive regulation of apoptotic process; MAPK cascade
Sources:Amigo / QuickGO
Orthologs
Databases	NCBI: entry; OMA: entry
Species	Human	Mouse
Entrez	4294	269881
Ensembl	ENSG00000130758	ENSMUSG00000040390
UniProt	Q02779	Q66L42
RefSeq (mRNA)	NM_002446	NM_001081292; NM_001290528
RefSeq (protein)	NP_002437	NP_001277457
Location (UCSC)	Chr 19: 40.19 – 40.22 Mb	Chr 7: 27.36 – 27.37 Mb
PubMed search
- Wikidata
View/Edit Human	View/Edit Mouse

Mitogen-activated protein kinase kinase kinase 10 is an enzyme that in humans is encoded by the MAP3K10 gene.

== Function ==
The protein encoded by this gene is a member of the serine/threonine kinase family. This kinase has been shown to activate MAPK8/JNK and MKK4/SEK1, and this kinase itself can be phosphorylated, and thus activated by JNK kinases. This kinase functions preferentially on the JNK signaling pathway, and is reported to be involved in nerve growth factor (NGF) induced neuronal apoptosis.

== Interactions ==
MAP3K10 has been shown to interact with:

- CDC42,
- Huntingtin,
- KIF3A,
- MAPK8IP1,
- MAPK8IP2, and
- NEUROD1.
