= MAPK10 =

Protein-coding gene in the species Homo sapiens

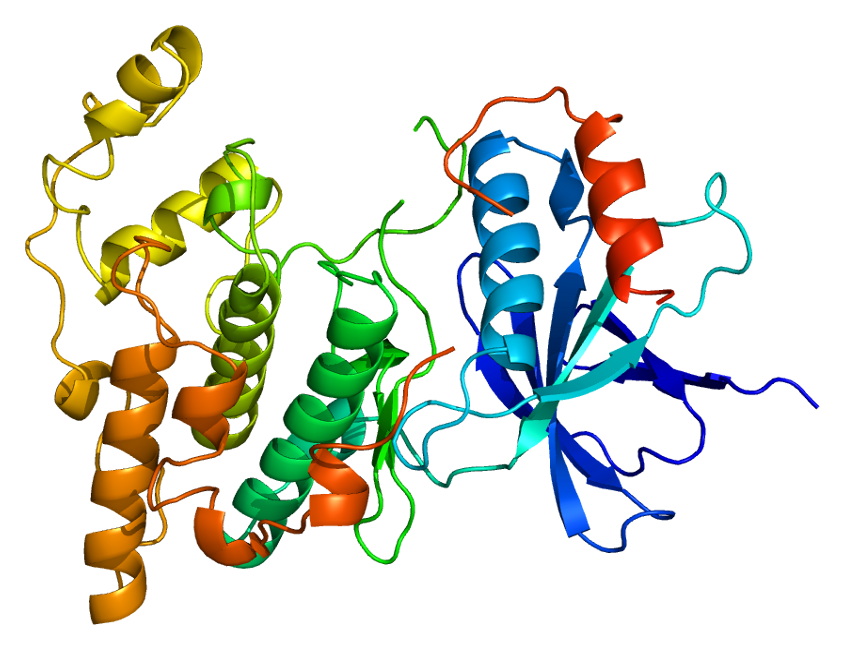

Identifiers
- Aliases: MAPK10, JNK3, JNK3A, PRKM10, SAPK1b, p493F12, p54bSAPK, mitogen-activated protein kinase 10
- External IDs: OMIM: 602897; MGI: 1346863; GeneCards: MAPK10
Available structures
PDB	Ortholog search: PDBe RCSB
PDB	List of PDB id codes 1JNK, 1PMN, 1PMU, 1PMV, 2B1P, 2EXC, 2O0U, 2O2U, 2OK1, 2P33, 2R9S, 2WAJ, 2ZDT, 2ZDU, 3CGF, 3CGO, 3DA6, 3FI2, 3FI3, 3FV8, 3G90, 3G9L, 3G9N, 3KVX, 3OXI, 3OY1, 3PTG, 3RTP, 3TTI, 3TTJ, 3V6R, 3V6S, 4H36, 4H39, 4H3B, 4KKG, 4KKH, 4U79, 4W4V, 4W4W, 4W4X, 4W4Y, 4WHZ, 4Y46, 4Y5H, 4Z9L, 4X21
Enzyme activity
EC #	BRENDA	ExPASy	KEGG	MetaCyc
2.7.11.24	↗	↗	↗	↗

Gene location (Human)
Chr.	Chromosome 4 (human)
Band	4q21.3	Start	85,990,007 bp
Band	4q21.3	End	86,594,625 bp

Gene location (Mouse)
Chr.	Chromosome 5 (mouse)
Band	5|5 E5	Start	103,055,814 bp
Band	5|5 E5	End	103,359,200 bp
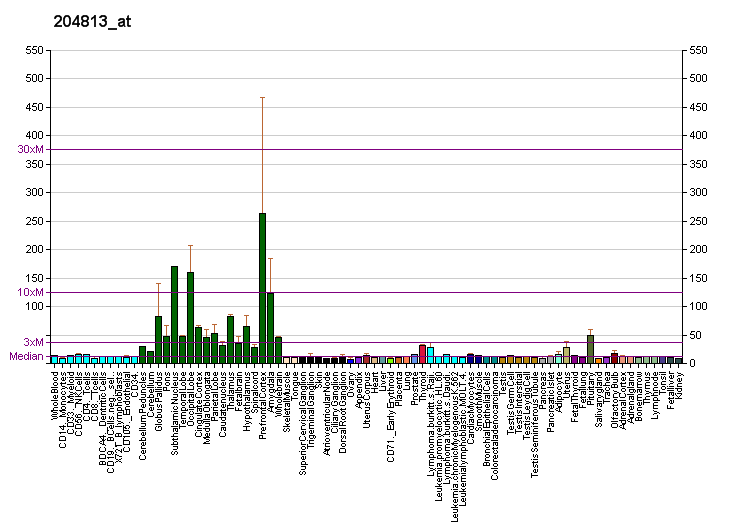
RNA expression pattern
Bgee	Human / Mouse (ortholog); Top expressed in: prefrontal cortex; right frontal lobe; Brodmann area 9; primary visual cortex; middle temporal gyrus; Brodmann area 23; cingulate gyrus; anterior cingulate cortex; endothelial cell; frontal pole / Top expressed in: substantia nigra; motor neuron; medial vestibular nucleus; anterior amygdaloid area; subiculum; medial geniculate nucleus; prefrontal cortex; medial dorsal nucleus; primary motor cortex; mammillary body; More reference expression data
BioGPS	More reference expression data
Gene ontology
Molecular function	transferase activity; nucleotide binding; protein kinase activity; MAP kinase activity; kinase activity; protein serine/threonine kinase activity; protein binding; ATP binding; MAP kinase kinase activity; JUN kinase activity
Cellular component	cytosol; membrane; mitochondrion; plasma membrane; nucleus; cytoplasm; neuron projection; nucleoplasm; perikaryon; glutamatergic synapse; intracellular anatomical structure
Biological process	phosphorylation; response to light stimulus; rhythmic process; Fc-epsilon receptor signaling pathway; protein phosphorylation; regulation of circadian rhythm; signal transduction; JUN phosphorylation; JNK cascade; regulation of gene expression; neuron development; intracellular signal transduction; cellular response to organic substance; negative regulation of transcription by RNA polymerase II; response to water deprivation; cellular hyperosmotic response; neurotransmitter receptor transport to postsynaptic membrane; vesicle-mediated transport in synapse; regulation of DNA-binding transcription factor activity; MAPK cascade
Sources:Amigo / QuickGO
Orthologs
Databases	NCBI: entry; OMA: entry
Species	Human	Mouse
Entrez	5602	26414
Ensembl	ENSG00000109339	ENSMUSG00000046709
UniProt	P53779; Q499Y8	Q61831
RefSeq (mRNA)	NM_002753; NM_138980; NM_138981; NM_138982; NM_001318067 NM_001318068; NM_001318069; NM_001351624; NM_001351625; NM_001363657	NM_001081567; NM_009158; NM_001310683; NM_001310685; NM_001310686 NM_001318102; NM_001318131
RefSeq (protein)	NP_001304996; NP_001304997; NP_001304998; NP_002744; NP_620446 NP_620448; NP_001338553; NP_001338554; NP_001350586; NP_001304997.1	NP_001075036; NP_001297612; NP_001297614; NP_001297615; NP_001305031 NP_001305060; NP_033184; NP_001394501; NP_001394502; NP_001394503; NP_001394504; NP_001394505; NP_001394506; NP_001394507; NP_001394508; NP_001394509; NP_001394513; NP_001394515; NP_001394517; NP_001394518; NP_001394521; NP_001394524; NP_001394528; NP_001394529; NP_001394530
Location (UCSC)	Chr 4: 85.99 – 86.59 Mb	Chr 5: 103.06 – 103.36 Mb
PubMed search
- Wikidata
View/Edit Human	View/Edit Mouse

Mitogen-activated protein kinase 10 also known as c-Jun N-terminal kinase 3 (JNK3) is an enzyme that in humans is encoded by the MAPK10 gene.

== Function ==
The protein encoded by this gene is a member of the MAP kinase family. MAP kinases act as an integration point for multiple biochemical signals, and are involved in a wide variety of cellular processes such as proliferation, differentiation, transcription regulation and development. This protein is a neuronal-specific form of c-Jun N-terminal kinases (JNKs). Through its phosphorylation and nuclear localization, this kinase plays regulatory roles in the signaling pathways during neuronal apoptosis. Beta-arrestin 2, a receptor-regulated MAP kinase scaffold protein, is found to interact with, and stimulate the phosphorylation of this kinase by MAP kinase kinase 4 (MKK4). Cyclin-dependent kinase 5 can phosphorylate, and inhibit the activity of this kinase, which may be important in preventing neuronal apoptosis. Four alternatively spliced transcript variants encoding distinct isoforms have been reported.

== Interactions ==
MAPK10 has been shown to interact with MAPK8IP3.
