= MAP3K11 =

Protein-coding gene in humans

Identifiers
- Aliases: MAP3K11, MEKK11, MLK-3, MLK3, PTK1, SPRK, mitogen-activated protein kinase kinase kinase 11
- External IDs: OMIM: 600050; MGI: 1346880; GeneCards: MAP3K11
Enzyme activity
| EC # | BRENDA | ExPASy | KEGG | MetaCyc |
|---|---|---|---|---|
| 2.7.11.25 | ↗ | ↗ | ↗ | ↗ |

Gene location (Human)
| Chr. | Chromosome 11 (human) |
| Band | 11q13.1 | Start | 65,597,756 bp |
| Band | 11q13.1 | End | 65,615,382 bp |

Gene location (Mouse)
| Chr. | Chromosome 19 (mouse) |
| Band | 19 A|19 4.34 cM | Start | 5,738,770 bp |
| Band | 19 A|19 4.34 cM | End | 5,752,893 bp |
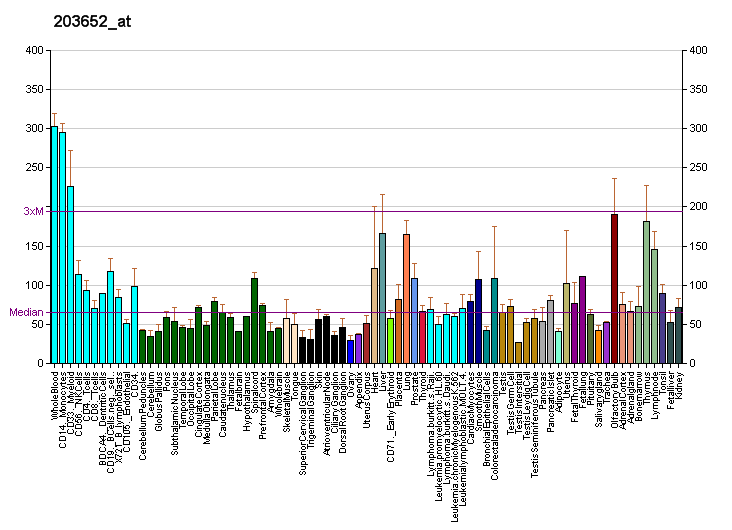
RNA expression pattern
| Bgee | Human / Mouse (ortholog); Top expressed in: sural nerve; granulocyte; apex of heart; mucosa of transverse colon; right lobe of liver; monocyte; right lung; spleen; C1 segment; upper lobe of left lung / Top expressed in: granulocyte; yolk sac; lip; external carotid artery; internal carotid artery; intestinal villus; right kidney; thymus; crypt of lieberkuhn of small intestine; zygote; More reference expression data |
| BioGPS | More reference expression data |
Gene ontology
| Molecular function | transferase activity; nucleotide binding; protein homodimerization activity; mitogen-activated protein kinase kinase kinase binding; kinase activity; protein binding; identical protein binding; mitogen-activated protein kinase kinase binding; ATP binding; MAP kinase kinase kinase activity; protein serine/threonine kinase activity; protein kinase activity; JUN kinase kinase kinase activity; protein tyrosine kinase activity |
| Cellular component | centrosome; membrane; microtubule organizing center; microtubule; cytoskeleton; cytoplasm; intracellular anatomical structure |
| Biological process | phosphorylation; positive regulation of JUN kinase activity; cell death; positive regulation of JNK cascade; positive regulation of neuron apoptotic process; microtubule-based process; cell population proliferation; protein autophosphorylation; JNK cascade; protein phosphorylation; positive regulation of apoptotic process; MAPK cascade; peptidyl-tyrosine phosphorylation |
Sources:Amigo / QuickGO
Orthologs
| Databases | NCBI: entry; OMA: entry |
| Species | Human | Mouse |
| Entrez | 4296 | 26403 |
| Ensembl | ENSG00000173327 | ENSMUSG00000004054 |
| UniProt | Q16584 | Q80XI6 |
| RefSeq (mRNA) | NM_002419 | NM_022012 |
| RefSeq (protein) | NP_002410; NP_002410.1 | NP_071295 |
| Location (UCSC) | Chr 11: 65.6 – 65.62 Mb | Chr 19: 5.74 – 5.75 Mb |
| PubMed search |
- Wikidata
| View/Edit Human | View/Edit Mouse |

Mitogen-activated protein kinase kinase kinase 11 is an enzyme that in humans is encoded by the MAP3K11 gene.

== Function ==
The protein encoded by this gene is called MLK3 and it is a member of the serine/threonine kinase family. This kinase contains a SH3 domain and a leucine zipper-basic motif. This kinase preferentially activates MAPK8/JNK kinase, and functions as a positive regulator of JNK signaling pathway. This kinase can directly phosphorylate, and activates JNK and p38, and is found to be involved in the transcription activity of AP1 mediated by Rho family GTPases and CDC42.

== Interactions ==
MAP3K11 has been shown to interact with:

- AKT1,
- CDC42,
- MAPK8IP1,
- MAPK8IP2, and
- SH3RF1.
