= MAP3K1 =

Protein-coding gene in the species Homo sapiens

Identifiers
- Aliases: MAP3K1, MAPKKK1, MEKK, MEKK 1, MEKK1, SRXY6, mitogen-activated protein kinase kinase kinase 1
- External IDs: OMIM: 600982; MGI: 1346872; GeneCards: MAP3K1
Enzyme activity
EC #	BRENDA	ExPASy	KEGG	MetaCyc
2.3.2.27	↗	↗	↗	↗
2.7.11.25	↗	↗	↗	↗

Gene location (Human)
Chr.	Chromosome 5 (human)
Band	5q11.2	Start	56,815,549 bp
Band	5q11.2	End	56,896,152 bp

Gene location (Mouse)
Chr.	Chromosome 13 (mouse)
Band	13 D2.2|13 63.36 cM	Start	111,882,962 bp
Band	13 D2.2|13 63.36 cM	End	111,945,527 bp
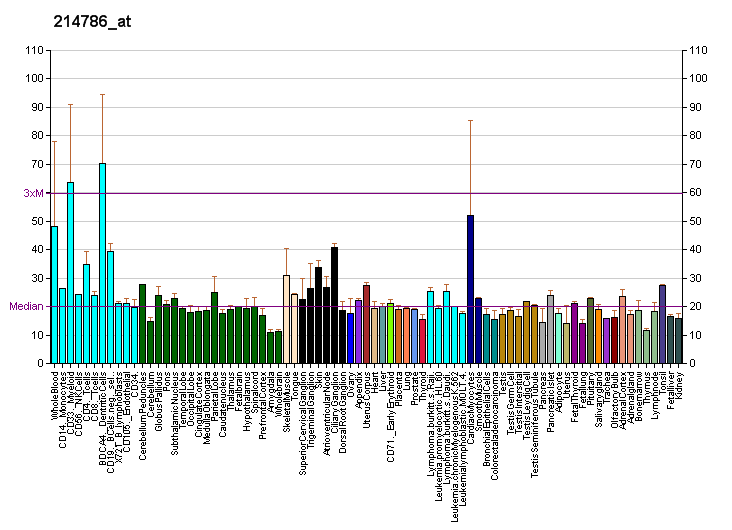
RNA expression pattern
Bgee	Human / Mouse (ortholog); Top expressed in: buccal mucosa cell; skin of thigh; skin of hip; parotid gland; corpus epididymis; monocyte; vulva; oral cavity; lactiferous duct; gums / Top expressed in: corneal stroma; submandibular gland; lactiferous gland; parotid gland; cumulus cell; blood; epithelium of stomach; neural layer of retina; Ileal epithelium; spleen; More reference expression data
BioGPS	More reference expression data
Gene ontology
Molecular function	transferase activity; nucleotide binding; zinc ion binding; metal ion binding; kinase activity; protein binding; MAP kinase kinase kinase activity; ATP binding; protein kinase binding; protein kinase activity; protein serine/threonine kinase activity
Cellular component	cytoplasm; cytosol
Biological process	phosphorylation; MyD88-dependent toll-like receptor signaling pathway; Fc-epsilon receptor signaling pathway; protein phosphorylation; cellular response to mechanical stimulus; MAPK cascade; regulation of mitotic cell cycle; signal transduction; stress-activated protein kinase signaling cascade; activation of protein kinase activity; regulation of apoptotic process
Sources:Amigo / QuickGO
Orthologs
Databases	NCBI: entry; OMA: entry
Species	Human	Mouse
Entrez	4214	26401
Ensembl	ENSG00000095015	ENSMUSG00000021754
UniProt	Q13233	P53349
RefSeq (mRNA)	NM_005921	NM_011945
RefSeq (protein)	NP_005912	n/a
Location (UCSC)	Chr 5: 56.82 – 56.9 Mb	Chr 13: 111.88 – 111.95 Mb
PubMed search
- Wikidata
View/Edit Human	View/Edit Mouse

Mitogen-activated protein kinase kinase kinase 1 (MAP3K1) is a signal transduction enzyme that in humans is encoded by the autosomal MAP3K1 gene.

== Function ==
MAP3K1 (or MEKK1) is a serine/threonine kinase and ubiquitin ligase that performs a pivotal role in a network of enzymes integrating cellular receptor responses to a number of mitogenic and metabolic stimuli, including: TNF receptor superfamily (TNFRs), T-cell receptor (TCR), Epidermal growth factor receptor (EGFR), and TGF beta receptor (TGFβR). Mitogen-activated protein kinase kinases (MAP2Ks) are substrates for direct phosphorylation by the MAP3K1 protein kinase. The MAP3K1 kinase domain may also be a modest activator of IκB kinase activation. The MAP3K1 E3 ubiquitin ligase recruits a ubiquitin-conjugating enzyme (including UBE2D2, UBE2D3, and UBE2N:UBE2V1) that has been loaded with ubiquitin, interacts with its substrates, and facilitates the transfer of ubiquitin from the ubiquitin-conjugating enzyme onto its substrates. Genetics has revealed that MAP3K1 is important in: embryonic development, tumorigenesis, cell growth, cell migration, cytokine production, and humoral immunity. MAP3K1 mutants were identified in breast cancer by GWAS.

== Structure ==
MAP3K1 contains a protein kinase domain, PHD finger (which has a RING finger domain-like structure) that serves as an E3 ubiquitin ligase, and scaffold protein regions that mediate protein–protein interactions.

== Genetic analyses in murine and avian models ==
MAP3K1 is highly conserved in Euteleostomi. The spontaneous recessive lidgap-Gates mutation (deletion of Map3k1 exons 2–9, initially described in the 1960s) identified on the SELH/Bc mouse strain causes the same open-eyelids-at-birth mutational phenotype as the gene knockout mutations of the mouse (but not human) MAP3K1 homolog (Map3k1) and also co-maps to distal Chromosome 13. MAP3K1 was analysed genetically by targeted mutagenesis using transgenic mice (C57BL/6 and C57BL/6 × 129 backgrounds), embryonic stem cells, and the DT40 cell line to identify genetic traits.

Map3k1 mutant	Species	Genetic model	References
Deletion of 132 codons in Map3k1 exon 1	Mus musculus	Transgenic mouse and embryonic stem cells	
Deletion kinase domain	Mus musculus	Transgenic mouse and embryonic stem cells	
Point mutations in Map3k1 exon 7 encoding E3 ubiquitin ligase	Mus musculus	Transgenic mouse and embryonic stem cells	
T cell-specific deletion generated by Lck promoter-driven Cre	Mus musculus	Transgenic mouse	
Deletion carboxyl-terminus	Gallus gallus domesticus	Lymphoblast cell line	

== Mechanism of MAPK activation by MAP3K1 ==
MAP3K1 contains multiple amino acid sites that are phosphorylated and ubiquitinated. Early biochemical analysis demonstrated that triple co-expression of MAP3K1, MAP2K and MAPK in bacterial cells was sufficient for the activation of MAPK. Later analysis of syngenic mice that harbour mutations in TRAF2, UBE2N, Map3k1 and Map3k7 identified critical regulators of cytokine-induced MAPK signal transduction in B cells. Cytokine signaling through MAP3K1 utilises two-stage cell signaling to recruit the signal transduction mechanism to cytokine receptors and then release the signal transduction components, altered by post-translational modification, from the cellular membrane to activate MAPKs. Genetic analysis has demonstrated that the E3 Ub ligase and the kinase domains of MAP3K1 are required for MAPK activation.

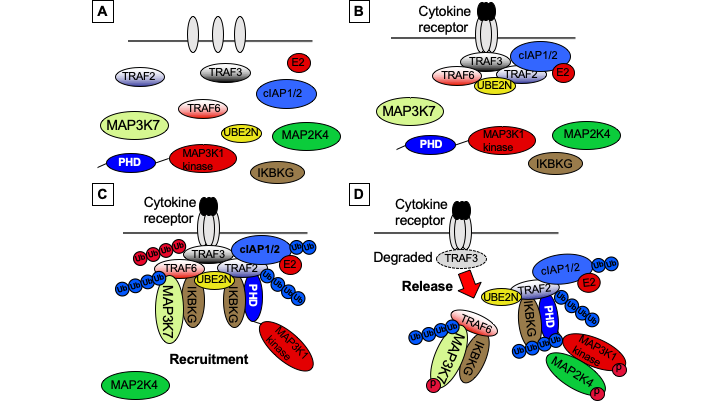
MAP3K1 signal transduction. A. Cytokine receptor prior to ligation by cytokine. B. Recruitment of TRAFs 2, 3 and 6 to the cytokine receptor. C. Ubiquitination of TRAFs. Recruitment of MAP3K1 and MAP3K7 signaling modules to TRAFs and scaffolding. D. Degradation of canonical Ubiquitin-TRAF3 by the proteasome, release of non-canonical Ubiquitin-TRAF2 and -MAP3Ks into the cytoplasm, and activation of MAP2K signaling.

== Cancers, other diseases and therapeutic targeting ==
MAP3K1 is a biomarker mutated in 3.24% of all human cancers. MAP3K1 has been associated with several diseases in non-syngeneic human populations, including: breast cancer, adenocarcinoma of the prostate, sarcomatoid hepatocellular carcinoma, acute respiratory distress syndrome, Langerhans cell histiocytosis, and 46,XY disorders of sex development. E6201 is an enzyme inhibitor of MAP3K1 that shows cross-specificity with MAP2K1.

== Interaction partners ==
MAP3K1 has been shown to interact with a number of proteins, including:

- AXIN1,
- C-Raf, MAP2K1, MAPK1,
- Grb2,
- MAPK8,
- TRAF2,
- UBE2I.
- TAB1, TNIP1, TNIP2. Signal transducing adaptor molecule,
- Transforming protein RhoA,
- RAC1, CDC42,
- ARHGAP4,
- MAP2K4, and
- PTK2.
