= Mitogen-activated protein kinase 9 =

Enzyme found in humans

MAPK9
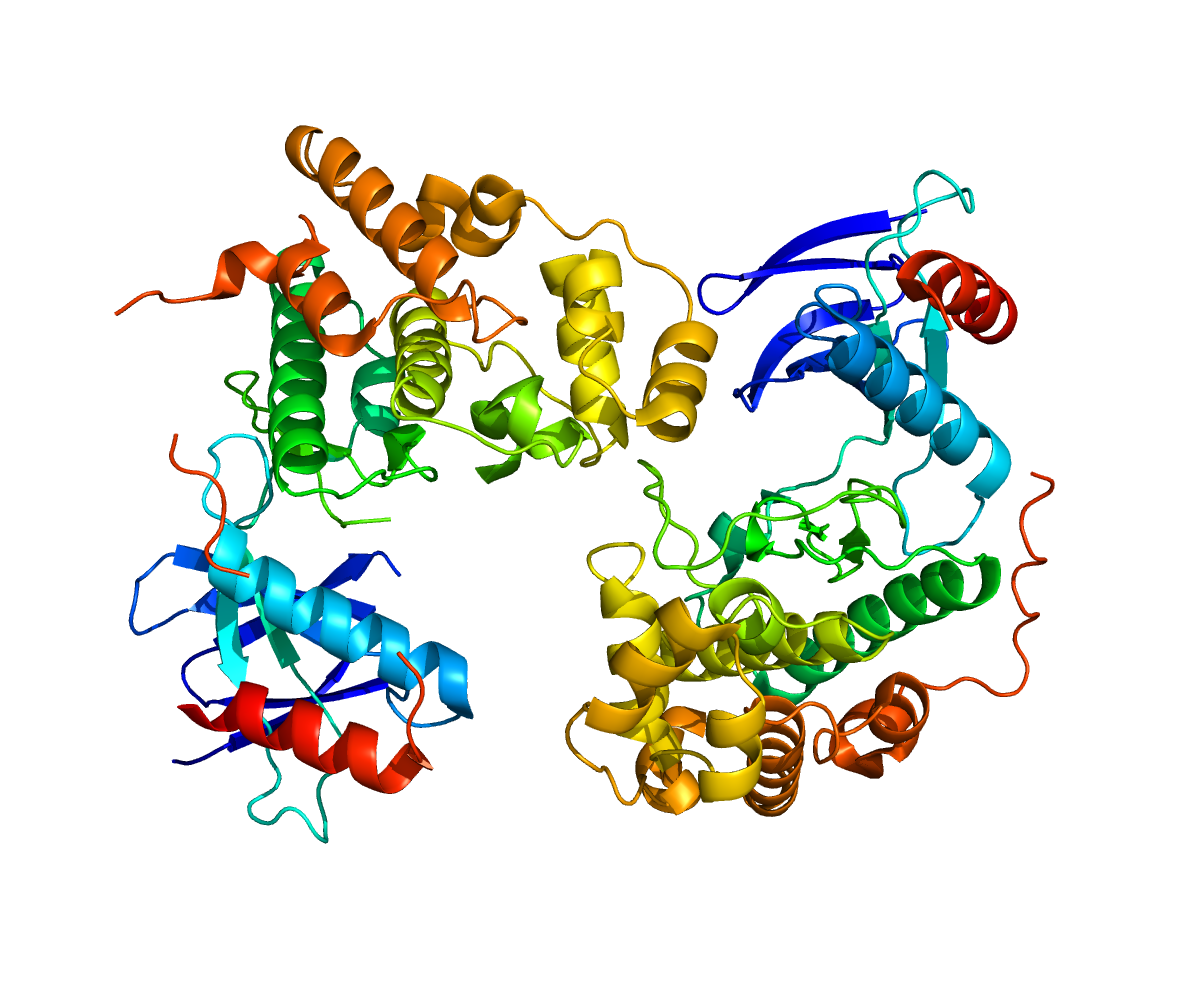

Identifiers
- Aliases: MAPK9, JNK-55, JNK2, JNK2A, JNK2ALPHA, JNK2B, JNK2BETA, PRKM9, SAPK, SAPK1a, p54a, p54aSAPK, mitogen-activated protein kinase 9
- External IDs: OMIM: 602896; MGI: 1346862; GeneCards: MAPK9
Available structures
| PDB | Ortholog search: PDBe RCSB |
| PDB | List of PDB id codes 3E7O, 3NPC |
Enzyme activity
| EC # | BRENDA | ExPASy | KEGG | MetaCyc |
|---|---|---|---|---|
| 2.7.11.24 | ↗ | ↗ | ↗ | ↗ |

Gene location (Human)
| Chr. | Chromosome 5 (human) |
| Band | 5q35.3 | Start | 180,233,143 bp |
| Band | 5q35.3 | End | 180,292,099 bp |

Gene location (Mouse)
| Chr. | Chromosome 11 (mouse) |
| Band | 11|11 B1.2 | Start | 49,737,578 bp |
| Band | 11|11 B1.2 | End | 49,777,248 bp |
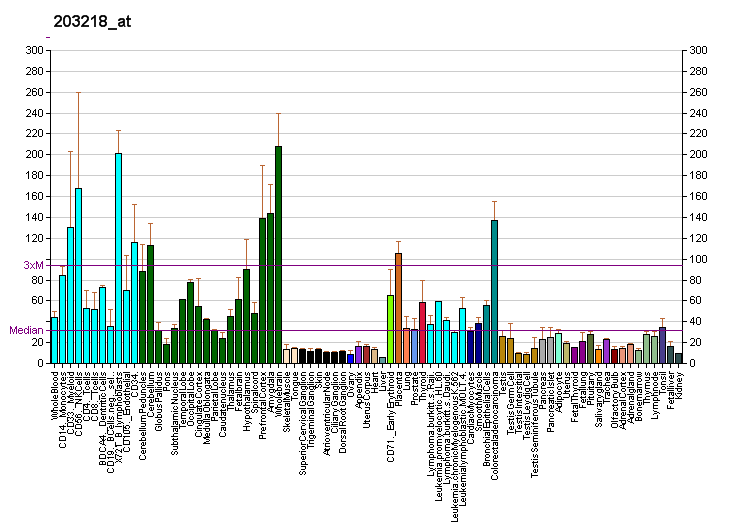

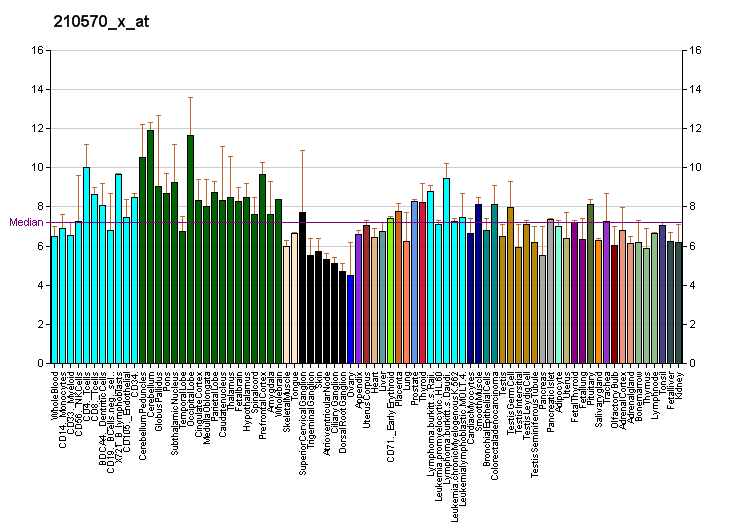
RNA expression pattern
| Bgee | Human / Mouse (ortholog); Top expressed in: middle temporal gyrus; Brodmann area 23; cerebellar cortex; cerebellar hemisphere; superior frontal gyrus; prefrontal cortex; pons; lateral nuclear group of thalamus; right hemisphere of cerebellum; dorsolateral prefrontal cortex / Top expressed in: dorsomedial hypothalamic nucleus; atrioventricular valve; cerebellar cortex; superior frontal gyrus; parotid gland; medial vestibular nucleus; submandibular gland; lateral hypothalamus; ventral tegmental area; neural layer of retina; More reference expression data |
| BioGPS | More reference expression data |
Gene ontology
| Molecular function | transferase activity; nucleotide binding; protein kinase activity; MAP kinase activity; kinase activity; protein serine/threonine kinase activity; protein binding; ATP binding; transcription factor binding; JUN kinase activity; protein serine/threonine/tyrosine kinase activity |
| Cellular component | cytosol; nucleoplasm; mitochondrion; nucleus; cytoplasm; neuron projection |
| Biological process | response to cadmium ion; phosphorylation; rhythmic process; positive regulation of apoptotic signaling pathway; positive regulation of podosome assembly; Fc-epsilon receptor signaling pathway; protein phosphorylation; positive regulation of macrophage derived foam cell differentiation; positive regulation of gene expression; JUN phosphorylation; regulation of circadian rhythm; JNK cascade; response to mechanical stimulus; positive regulation of apoptotic process; neuron development; cellular response to organic substance; protein localization to tricellular tight junction; cellular response to reactive oxygen species; cellular response to cadmium ion; peptidyl-serine phosphorylation; positive regulation of protein ubiquitination; positive regulation of transcription factor catabolic process; regulation of gene expression; intracellular signal transduction; regulation of DNA-binding transcription factor activity |
Sources:Amigo / QuickGO
Orthologs
| Databases | NCBI: entry; OMA: entry |
| Species | Human | Mouse |
| Entrez | 5601 | 26420 |
| Ensembl | ENSG00000050748 | ENSMUSG00000020366 |
| UniProt | P45984 | Q9WTU6 |
| RefSeq (mRNA) | NM_001135044; NM_001308244; NM_002752; NM_139068; NM_139069 NM_139070; NM_001364607; NM_001364608; NM_001364609; NM_001364610; NM_001364611; NM_001364612; NM_001364613 | NM_001163671; NM_001163672; NM_016961; NM_207692 |
| RefSeq (protein) | NP_001128516; NP_001295173; NP_002743; NP_620707; NP_620708 NP_620709; NP_001351536; NP_001351537; NP_001351538; NP_001351539; NP_001351540; NP_001351541; NP_001351542 | NP_001157143; NP_001157144; NP_058657; NP_997575 |
| Location (UCSC) | Chr 5: 180.23 – 180.29 Mb | Chr 11: 49.74 – 49.78 Mb |
| PubMed search |
- Wikidata
| View/Edit Human | View/Edit Mouse |

Mitogen-activated protein kinase 9 is an enzyme that in humans is encoded by the MAPK9 gene.

== Function ==
The protein encoded by this gene is a member of the MAP kinase family. MAP kinases act as an integration point for multiple biochemical signals, and are involved in a wide variety of cellular processes such as proliferation, differentiation, transcription regulation and development. This kinase targets specific transcription factors, and thus mediates immediate-early gene expression in response to various cell stimuli. It is most closely related to MAPK8, both of which are involved in UV radiation-induced apoptosis, thought to be related to the cytochrome c-mediated cell death pathway. This gene and MAPK8 are also known as c-Jun N-terminal kinases. This kinase blocks the ubiquitination of tumor suppressor p53, and thus it increases the stability of p53 in nonstressed cells. Studies of this gene's mouse counterpart suggest a key role in T-cell differentiation. Four alternatively spliced transcript variants encoding distinct isoforms have been reported.

== Interactions ==
Mitogen-activated protein kinase 9 has been shown to interact with:

- Grb2,
- MAPK8IP1,
- MAPK8IP2,
- MAPK8IP3
- P53, and
- TOB1.
