= MAP2K4 =

Protein-coding gene in the species Homo sapiens

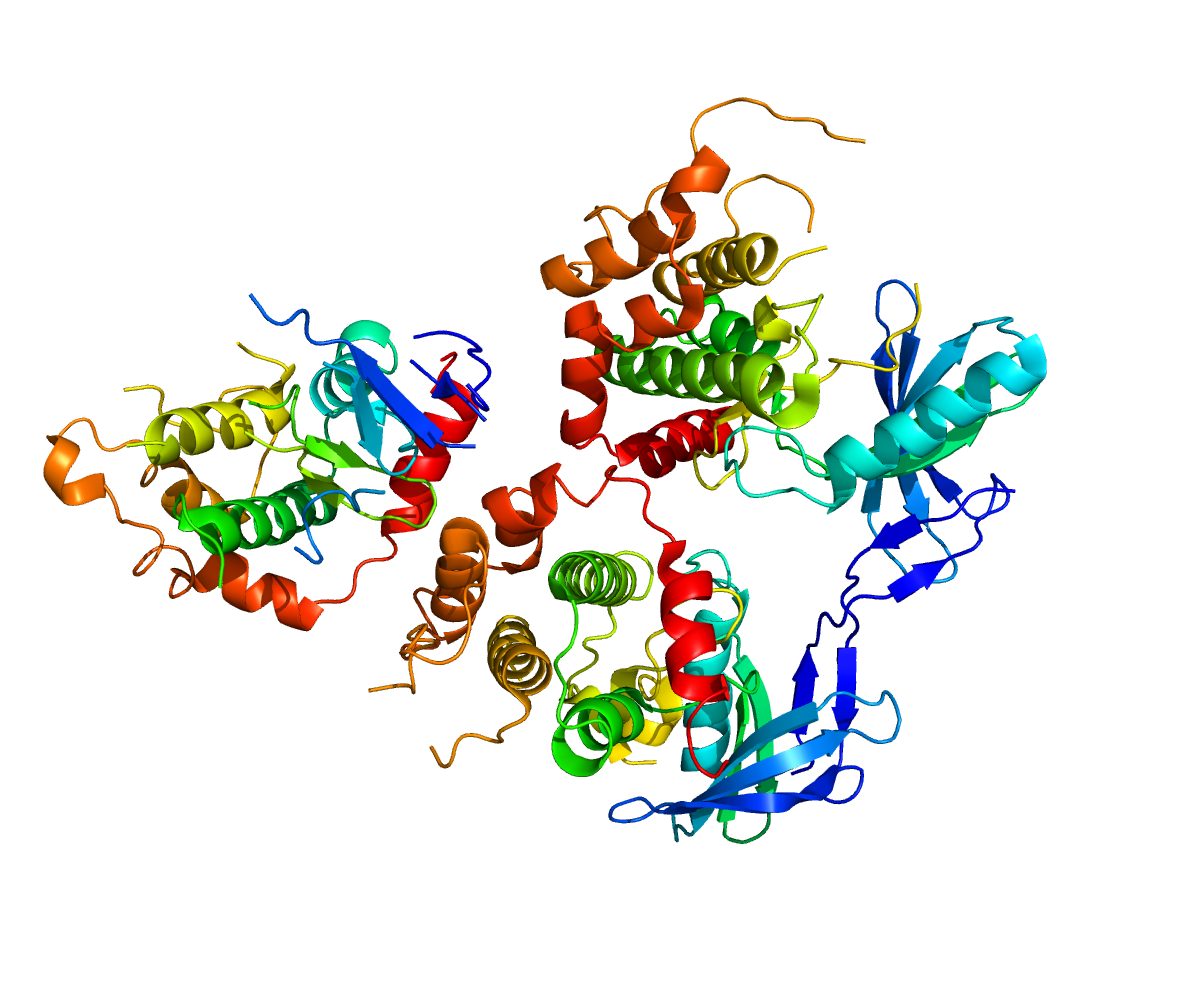

Identifiers
- Aliases: MAP2K4, JNKK, JNKK1, MAPKK4, MEK4, MKK4, PRKMK4, SAPKK-1, SAPKK1, SEK1, SERK1, SKK1, mitogen-activated protein kinase kinase 4
- External IDs: OMIM: 601335; MGI: 1346869; GeneCards: MAP2K4
Available structures
PDB	Ortholog search: PDBe RCSB
PDB	List of PDB id codes 3ALN, 3ALO, 3VUT
Enzyme activity
EC #	BRENDA	ExPASy	KEGG	MetaCyc
2.7.12.2	↗	↗	↗	↗

Gene location (Human)
Chr.	Chromosome 17 (human)
Band	17p12	Start	12,020,829 bp
Band	17p12	End	12,143,830 bp

Gene location (Mouse)
Chr.	Chromosome 11 (mouse)
Band	11 B3|11 40.53 cM	Start	65,579,069 bp
Band	11 B3|11 40.53 cM	End	65,679,123 bp
RNA expression pattern
Bgee	Human / Mouse (ortholog); Top expressed in: lateral nuclear group of thalamus; Brodmann area 46; postcentral gyrus; orbitofrontal cortex; pars compacta; middle temporal gyrus; superior frontal gyrus; prefrontal cortex; Achilles tendon; Brodmann area 23 / Top expressed in: dentate gyrus of hippocampal formation granule cell; genital tubercle; facial motor nucleus; superior frontal gyrus; primary visual cortex; anterior horn of spinal cord; secondary oocyte; dorsomedial hypothalamic nucleus; granulocyte; paraventricular nucleus of hypothalamus; More reference expression data
BioGPS	n/a
Gene ontology
Molecular function	transferase activity; protein kinase activity; nucleotide binding; kinase activity; protein binding; protein tyrosine kinase activity; ATP binding; MAP kinase kinase activity; JUN kinase kinase activity; protein serine/threonine kinase activity; mitogen-activated protein kinase kinase kinase binding
Cellular component	cytoplasm; nucleus; dendrite cytoplasm; cytosol; perikaryon; axon
Biological process	phosphorylation; MAPK cascade; protein phosphorylation; cellular response to mechanical stimulus; response to wounding; peptidyl-tyrosine phosphorylation; signal transduction; negative regulation of motor neuron apoptotic process; apoptotic process; cell growth involved in cardiac muscle cell development; cellular response to sorbitol; positive regulation of smooth muscle cell apoptotic process; JNK cascade; positive regulation of protein phosphorylation; positive regulation of neuron apoptotic process; positive regulation of DNA replication; positive regulation of apoptotic process; positive regulation of nitric-oxide synthase biosynthetic process; regulation of mitotic cell cycle; stress-activated protein kinase signaling cascade; activation of protein kinase activity; regulation of apoptotic process; Fc-epsilon receptor signaling pathway
Sources:Amigo / QuickGO
Orthologs
Databases	NCBI: entry; OMA: entry
Species	Human	Mouse
Entrez	6416	26398
Ensembl	ENSG00000065559	ENSMUSG00000033352
UniProt	P45985	P47809
RefSeq (mRNA)	NM_001281435; NM_003010	NM_009157; NM_001316367; NM_001316368; NM_001316369; NM_001362739 NM_001362740
RefSeq (protein)	NP_001268364; NP_003001	NP_001303296; NP_001303297; NP_001303298; NP_033183; NP_001349668 NP_001349669
Location (UCSC)	Chr 17: 12.02 – 12.14 Mb	Chr 11: 65.58 – 65.68 Mb
PubMed search
- Wikidata
View/Edit Human	View/Edit Mouse

Dual-specificity mitogen-activated protein kinase kinase 4 is an enzyme that in humans is encoded by the MAP2K4 gene.

MAP2K4 encodes a dual-specificity kinase that belongs to the Ser/Thr protein kinase family. MAP2K4 phosphorylates MAP kinases in response to various environmental stresses or mitogenic stimuli. MAPK8/JNK1, MAPK9/JNK2, and MAPK14/p38 are substrates for MAP2K4, but MAPK1/ERK2 and MAPK3/ERK1 are not phosphorylated by MAP2K4. Structurally, MAP2K4 contains a kinase domain that is phosphorylated and activated by MAP3K1(a.k.a. MEKK1). MAP2K4 contains multiple amino acid sites that are phosphorylated and ubiquitinated. Genetic studies using Map2k4 knockout mice revealed embryonic lethality, impaired hepatogenesis and defective liver formation. Analysis of chimeric mice identified a role for Map2k4 in T cell cytokine production and proliferation. Map2k4-deficient chimeric mice frequently develop lymphadenopathy. MAP2K4 is altered in 1.97% of all human cancers.

== Interactions ==
MAP2K4 has been shown to interact with:

- MAP3K1,
- FLNC,
- MAPK8,
- MAPK8IP3 and
- AKT1.
- ITCH.
