= Mitogen-activated protein kinase =

P38 mitogen-activated protein kinases

Identifiers
- EC no.: 2.7.11.24
- CAS no.: 142243-02-5

Databases
- BRENDA: enzyme data
- ExPASy: NiceZyme view
- KEGG: enzyme entry
- MetaCyc: metabolic pathway
- Rhea: reactions
- PDB structures: RCSB PDB PDBe PDBsum
- Gene Ontology: AmiGO / QuickGO
Search
- PMC: articles
- PubMed: articles
- NCBI: proteins

A mitogen-activated protein kinase (MAPK or MAP kinase) is a type of serine/threonine-specific protein kinases involved in directing cellular responses to a diverse array of stimuli, such as mitogens, osmotic stress, heat shock and proinflammatory cytokines. They regulate cell functions including proliferation, gene expression, differentiation, mitosis, cell survival, and apoptosis.

MAP kinases are found in eukaryotes only, but they are fairly diverse and encountered in all animals, fungi and plants, and even in an array of unicellular eukaryotes.

MAPKs belong to the CMGC (CDK/MAPK/GSK3/CLK) kinase group. The closest relatives of MAPKs are the cyclin-dependent kinases (CDKs).

== Discovery ==
The first mitogen-activated protein kinase to be discovered was ERK1 (MAPK3) in mammals. Since ERK1 and its close relative ERK2 (MAPK1) are both involved in growth factor signaling, the family was termed "mitogen-activated". With the discovery of other members, even from distant organisms (e.g. plants), it has become increasingly clear that the name is a misnomer, since most MAPKs are actually involved in the response to potentially harmful, abiotic stress stimuli (hyperosmosis, oxidative stress, DNA damage, low osmolarity, infection, etc.). Because plants cannot "flee" from stress, terrestrial plants have the highest number of MAPK genes per organism ever found. Thus the role of mammalian ERK1/2 kinases as regulators of cell proliferation is not a generic, but a highly specialized function.

== Types ==
Most MAPKs have a number of shared characteristics, such as the activation dependent on two phosphorylation events, a three-tiered pathway architecture and similar substrate recognition sites. These are the "classical" MAP kinases. But there are also some ancient outliers from the group as sketched above, that do not have dual phosphorylation sites, only form two-tiered pathways, and lack the features required by other MAPKs for substrate binding. These are usually referred to as "atypical" MAPKs. It is yet unclear if the atypical MAPKs form a single group as opposed to the classical ones.

The mammalian MAPK family of kinases includes three subfamilies:

1. Extracellular signal-regulated kinases (ERKs)
2. c-Jun N-terminal kinases (JNKs)
3. p38 mitogen-activated protein kinases (p38s)

Generally, ERKs are activated by growth factors and mitogens, whereas cellular stresses and inflammatory cytokines activate JNKs and p38s.

== Activation ==
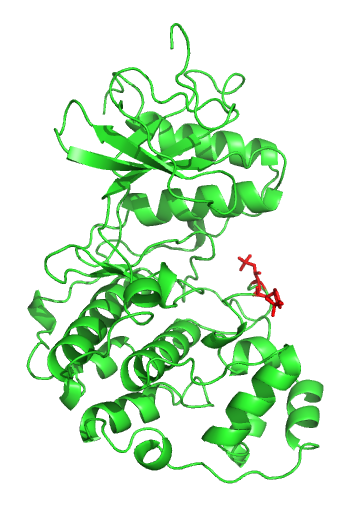
X-ray structure of the ERK2 MAP kinase in its active form. Phosphorylated residues are displayed in red. Rendering based on pdb entry 2ERK.

Mitogen-activated protein kinases are catalytically inactive in their base form. In order to become active, they require (potentially multiple) phosphorylation events in their activation loops. This is conducted by specialized enzymes of the STE protein kinase group. In this way protein dynamics can induce a conformational change in the structure of the protein via long-range allostery.

In the case of classical MAP kinases, the activation loop contains a characteristic TxY (threonine-x-tyrosine) motif (TEY in mammalian ERK1 and ERK2, TDY in ERK5, TPY in JNKs, TGY in p38 kinases) that needs to be phosphorylated on both the threonine and the tyrosine residues in order to lock the kinase domain in a catalytically competent conformation. In vivo and in vitro, phosphorylation of tyrosine oftentimes precedes phosphorylation of threonine, although phosphorylation of either residue can occur in the absence of the other.

This tandem activation loop phosphorylation (that was proposed to be either distributive or processive, dependent on the cellular environment) is performed by members of the Ste7 protein kinase family, also known as MAP2 kinases. MAP2 kinases in turn, are also activated by phosphorylation, by a number of different upstream serine-threonine kinases (MAP3 kinases). Because MAP2 kinases display very little activity on substrates other than their cognate MAPK, classical MAPK pathways form multi-tiered, but relatively linear pathways. These pathways can effectively convey stimuli from the cell membrane (where many MAP3Ks are activated) to the nucleus (where only MAPKs may enter) or to many other subcellular targets.

In comparison to the three-tiered classical MAPK pathways, some atypical MAP kinases appear to have a more ancient, two-tiered system. ERK3 (MAPK6) and ERK4 (MAPK4) were recently shown to be directly phosphorylated and thus activated by PAK kinases (related to other MAP3 kinases). In contrast to the classical MAP kinases, these atypical MAPKs require only a single residue in their activation loops to be phosphorylated. The details of NLK and ERK7 (MAPK15) activation remain unknown.

Inactivation of MAPKs is performed by a number of phosphatases. A very conserved family of dedicated phosphatases is the so-called MAP kinase phosphatases (MKPs), a subgroup of dual-specificity phosphatases (DUSPs). As their name implies, these enzymes are capable of hydrolyzing the phosphate from both phosphotyrosine and the phosphothreonine residues. Since removal of either phosphate groups will greatly reduce MAPK activity, essentially abolishing signaling, some tyrosine phosphatases are also involved in inactivating MAP kinases (e.g. the phosphatases HePTP, STEP and PTPRR in mammals).

== Signaling cascades ==
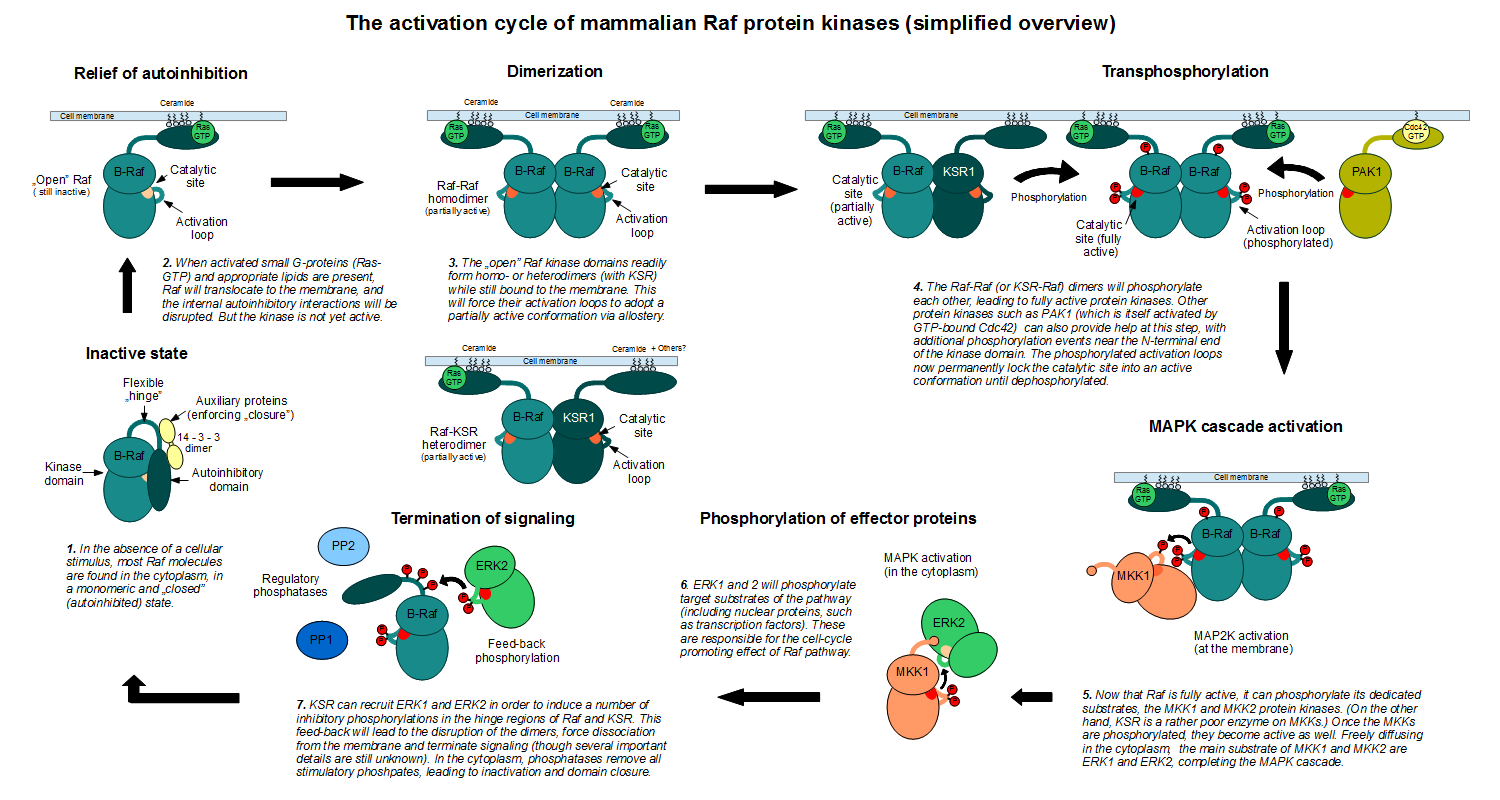
Example for the inner workings of a MAP3 kinase: the activation cycle of mammalian Raf proteins (greatly simplified overview)

As mentioned above, MAPKs typically form multi-tiered pathways, receiving input several levels above the actual MAP kinase. In contrast to the relatively simple, phosphorylation-dependent activation mechanism of MAPKs and MAP2Ks, MAP3Ks have stunningly complex regulation. Many of the better-known MAP3Ks, such as c-Raf, MEKK4 or MLK3 require multiple steps for their activation. These are typically allosterically-controlled enzymes, tightly locked into an inactive state by multiple mechanisms. The first step en route to their activation consists of relieving their autoinhibition by a smaller ligand (such as Ras for c-Raf, GADD45 for MEKK4 or Cdc42 for MLK3). This commonly (but not always) happens at the cell membrane, where most of their activators are bound (note that small G-proteins are constitutively membrane-associated due to prenylation). That step is followed by side-to-side homo- and heterodimerisation of their now accessible kinase domains. Recently determined complex structures reveal that the dimers are formed in an orientation that leaves both their substrate-binding regions free. Importantly, this dimerisation event also forces the MAP3 kinase domains to adopt a partially active conformation. Full activity is only achieved once these dimers transphosphorylate each other on their activation loops. The latter step can also be achieved or aided by auxiliary protein kinases (MAP4 kinases, members of the Ste20 family). Once a MAP3 kinase is fully active, it may phosphorylate its substrate MAP2 kinases, which in turn will phosphorylate their MAP kinase substrates.

=== In animals ===
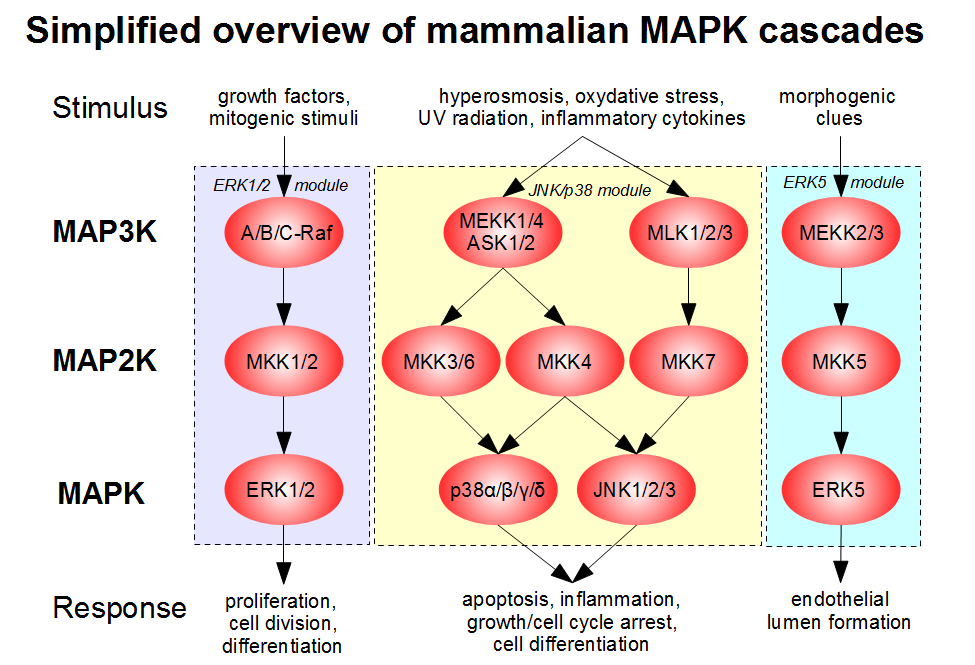
A simplified overview of MAPK pathways in mammals, organised into three main signaling modules (ERK1/2, JNK/p38 and ERK5)

The ERK1/2 pathway of mammals is probably the best-characterized MAPK system. The most important upstream activators of this pathway are the Raf proteins (A-Raf, B-Raf or c-Raf), the key mediators of response to growth factors (EGF, FGF, PDGF, etc.); but other MAP3Ks such as c-Mos and Tpl2/Cot can also play the same role. All these enzymes phosphorylate and thus activate the MKK1 and/or MKK2 kinases, that are highly specific activators for ERK1 and ERK2. The latter phosphorylate a number of substrates important for cell proliferation, cell cycle progression, cell division and differentiation (RSK kinases, Elk-1 transcription factor, etc.)

In contrast to the relatively well-insulated ERK1/2 pathway, mammalian p38 and JNK kinases have most of their activators shared at the MAP3K level (MEKK1, MEKK4, ASK1, TAK1, MLK3, TAOK1, etc.). In addition, some MAP2K enzymes may activate both p38 and JNK (MKK4), while others are more specific for either JNK (MKK7) or p38 (MKK3 and MKK6). Due to these interlocks, there are very few if any stimuli that can elicit JNK activation without simultaneously activating p38 or reversed. Both JNK and p38 signaling pathways are responsive to stress stimuli, such as cytokines, ultraviolet irradiation, heat shock, and osmotic shock, and are involved in adaptation to stress, apoptosis or cell differentiation. JNKs have a number of dedicated substrates that only they can phosphorylate (c-Jun, NFAT4, etc.), while p38s also have some unique targets (e.g. the MAPKAP kinases MK2 and MK3), ensuring the need for both in order to respond to stressful stimuli.

ERK5 is part of a fairly well-separated pathway in mammals. Its sole specific upstream activator MKK5 is turned on in response to the MAP3 kinases MEKK2 and MEKK3. The specificity of these interactions are provided by the unique architecture of MKK5 and MEKK2/3, both containing N-terminal PB1 domains, enabling direct heterodimerisation with each other. The PB1 domain of MKK5 also contributes to the ERK5-MKK5 interaction: it provides a special interface (in addition to the D-motif found in MKK5) through which MKK5 can specifically recognize its substrate ERK5. Although the molecular-level details are poorly known, MEKK2 and MEKK3 respond to certain developmental cues to direct endothel formation and cardiac morphogenesis. While also implicated in brain development, the embryonic lethality of ERK5 inactivation due to cardiac abnormalities underlines its central role in mammalian vasculogenesis. It is notable, that conditional knockout of ERK5 in adult animals is also lethal, due to the widespread disruption of endothelial barriers. Mutations in the upstream components of the ERK5 pathway (the CCM complex) are thought to underlie cerebral cavernous malformations in humans.

=== In fungi ===
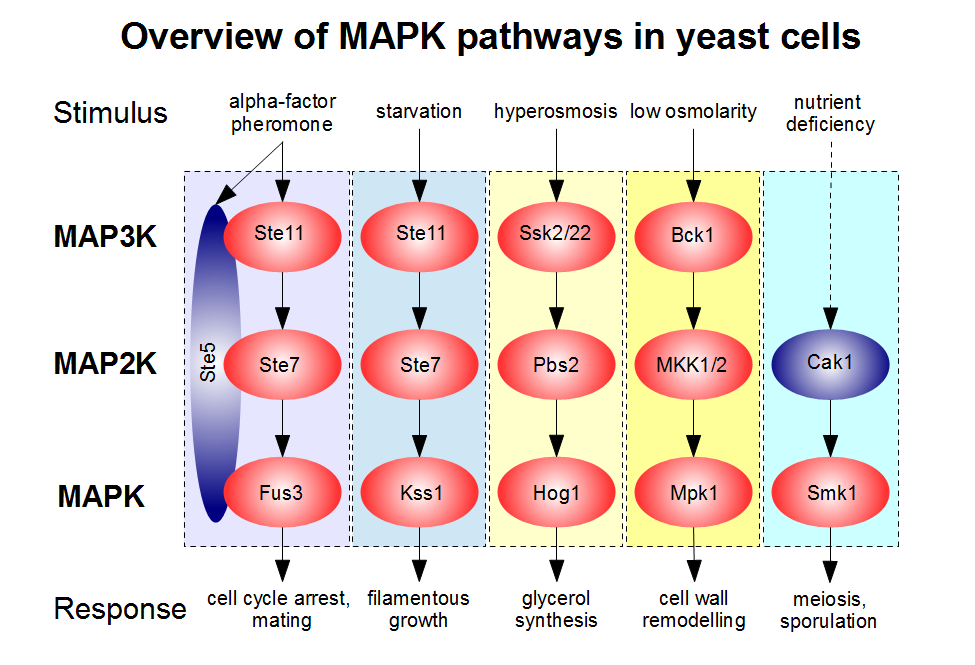
Overview of MAPK pathways in yeast. Non-canonical components of the five known modules (mating, filamentation, hyperosmosis, cell wall integrity, sporulation pathways) are colored in blue.

MAPK pathways of fungi are also well studied. In yeast, the Fus3 MAPK is responsible for cell cycle arrest and mating in response to pheromone stimulation. The pheromone alpha-factor is sensed by a seven transmembrane receptor. The recruitment and activation of Fus3 pathway components are strictly dependent on heterotrimeric G-protein activation. The mating MAPK pathway consist of three tiers (Ste11-Ste7-Fus3), but the MAP2 and MAP3 kinases are shared with another pathway, the Kss1 or filamentous growth pathway. While Fus3 and Kss1 are closely related ERK-type kinases, yeast cells can still activate them separately, with the help of a scaffold protein Ste5 that is selectively recruited by the G-proteins of the mating pathway. The trick is that Ste5 can associate with and "unlock" Fus3 for Ste7 as a substrate in a tertiary complex, while it does not do the same for Kss1, leaving the filamentous growth pathway to be activated only in the absence of Ste5 recruitment.

Fungi also have a pathway reminiscent of mammalian JNK/p38 signaling. This is the Hog1 pathway: activated by high osmolarity (in Saccharomyces cerevisiae) or a number of other abiotic stresses (in Schizosaccharomyces pombe). The MAP2 kinase of this pathway is called Pbs2 (related to mammalian MKK3/4/6/7), the dedicated MAP3 kinases involved in activation are Ssk2 and SSk22. The system in S. cerevisiae is activated by a sophisticated osmosensing module consisting of the Sho1 and Sln1 proteins, but it is yet unclear how other stimuli can elicit activation of Hog1. Yeast also displays a number of other MAPK pathways without close homologs in animals, such as the cell wall integrity pathway (Mpk1/Slt2) or the sporulation pathway (Smk1).

=== In plants ===
Despite the high number of MAPK genes, MAPK pathways of higher plants were studied less than animal or fungal ones. Although their signaling appears very complex, the MPK3, MPK4 and MPK6 kinases of Arabidopsis thaliana are key mediators of responses to osmotic shock, oxidative stress, response to cold and involved in anti-pathogen responses. Asai et al. 2002's model of MAPK mediated immunity passes the effector recognition signal from FLS2 ⇨ MEKK1 ⇨ MKK4 or MKK5 ⇨ MPK3 and MPK6 ⇨ WRKY22 or WRKY29. However the work of Mészáros et al. 2006 and Suarez-Rodriguez et al. 2007 give other orders for this pathway and it is possible that these are parallel pathways operating simultaneously. They are also involved in morphogenesis, since MPK4 mutants display severe dwarfism.

== Evolutionary relationships ==
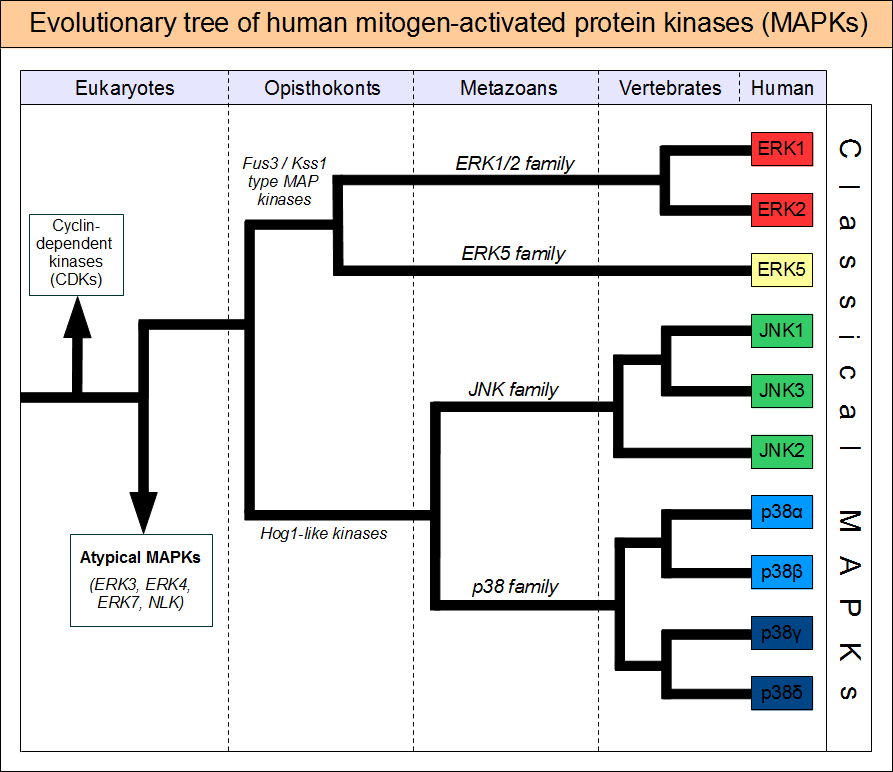
The evolutionary origins of human mitogen-activated protein kinases (MAPKs)

Members of the MAPK family can be found in every eukaryotic organism examined so far. In particular, both classical and atypical MAP kinases can be traced back to the root of the radiation of major eukaryotic groups. Terrestrial plants contain four groups of classical MAPKs (MAPK-A, MAPK-B, MAPK-C and MAPK-D) that are involved in response to myriads of abiotic stresses. However, none of these groups can be directly equated to the clusters of classical MAPKs found in opisthokonts (fungi and animals). In the latter, the major subgroups of classical MAPKs form the ERK/Fus3-like branch (that is further sub-divided in metazoans into ERK1/2 and ERK5 subgroups), and the p38/Hog1-like kinases (that has also split into the p38 and the JNK subgroups in multicellular animals). In addition, there are several MAPKs in both fungi and animals, whose origins are less clear, either due to high divergence (e.g. NLK), or due to possibly being an early offshoot to the entire MAPK family (ERK3, ERK4, ERK7). In vertebrates, due to the twin whole genome duplications after the cephalochordate/vertebrate split, there are several paralogs in every group. Thus ERK1 and ERK2 both correspond to the Drosophila kinase rolled, JNK1, JNK2 and JNK3 are all orthologous to the gene basket in Drosophila. Although among the p38 group, p38 alpha and beta are clearly paralogous pairs, and so are p38 gamma and delta in vertebrates, the timing of the base split is less clear, given that many metazoans already possess multiple p38 homologs (there are three p38-type kinases in Drosophila, Mpk2(p38a), p38b and p38c). The single ERK5 protein appears to fill a very specialized role (essential for vascular development in vertebrates) wherever it is present. This lineage has been deleted in protostomes, together with its upstream pathway components (MEKK2/3, MKK5), although they are clearly present in cnidarians, sponges and even in certain unicellular organisms (e.g. the choanoflagellate Monosiga brevicollis) closely related to the origins of multicellular animals.

The split between classical and some atypical MAP kinases happened quite early. This is suggested not just by the high divergence between extant genes, but also recent discoveries of atypical MAPKs in primitive, basal eukaryotes. The genome sequencing of Giardia lamblia revealed the presence of two MAPK genes, one of them similar to the already-well-known mammalian MAPKs (ERKs, p38s, etc.), the other one showing similarities to the mammalian ERK7 protein. The situation is similar in the multicellular amoeba Dictyostelium discoideum, where the ddERK1 protein appears to be a classical MAPK, while ddERK2 more closely resembles our ERK7 and ERK3/4 proteins. Atypical MAPKs can also be found in higher plants, although they are poorly known. Similar to the situation in mammals, most aspects of atypical MAPKs are uncharacterized due to the lack of research focus on this area.

== Substrate and partner recognition ==
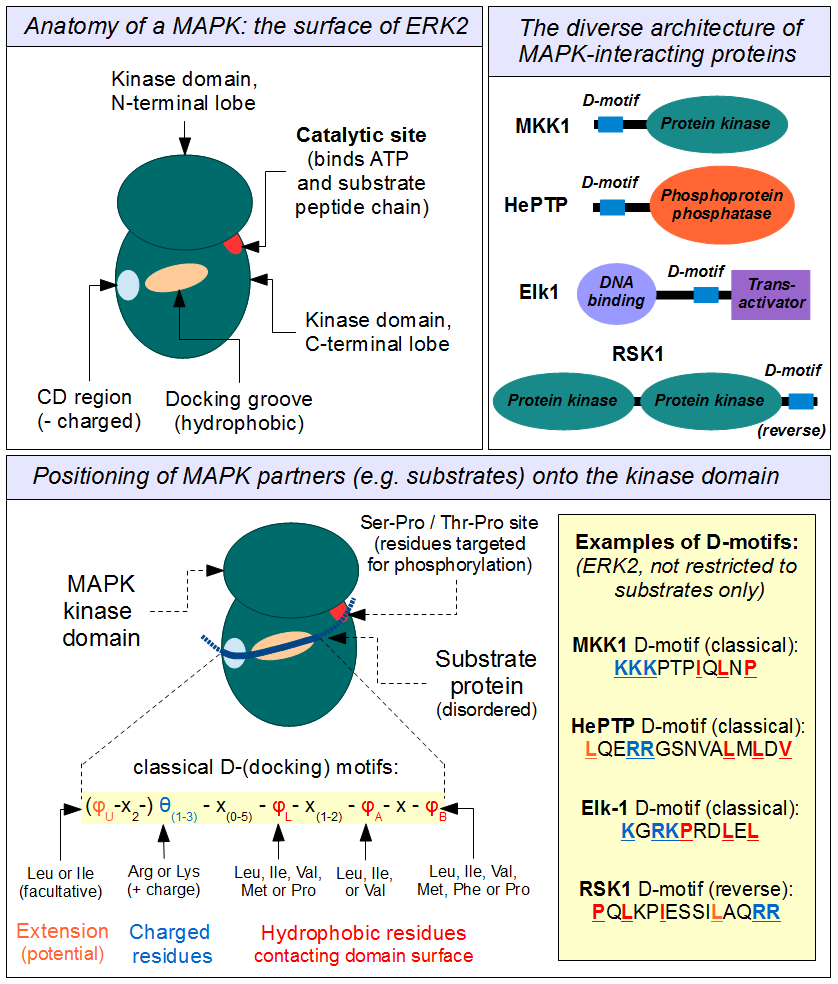
The overview of the D-motif dependent MAPK interactions and substrate recognition. All cited examples refer to the interactions of the mammalian ERK2 protein.

As typical for the CMGC kinase group, the catalytic site of MAP kinases has a very loose consensus sequence for substrates. Like all their relatives, they only require the target serine / threonine amino acids to be followed by a small amino acid, preferably proline ("proline-directed kinases"). But as SP/TP sites are extremely common in all proteins, additional substrate-recognition mechanisms have evolved to ensure signaling fidelity. Unlike their closest relatives, the cyclin-dependent kinases (CDKs), where substrates are recognized by the cyclin subunit, MAPKs associate with their substrates via auxiliary binding regions on their kinase domains. The most important such region consists of the hydrophobic docking groove and the negatively charged CD-region. Together they recognize the so-called MAPK docking or D-motifs (also called kinase interaction motif / KIM). D-motifs essentially consist of one or two positively charged amino acids, followed by alternating hydrophobic residues (mostly leucines), typically upstream of the phosphorylation site by 10–50 amino acids. Many of the known MAPK substrates contain such D-motifs that can not only bind to, but also provide specific recognition by certain MAPKs. D-motifs are not restricted to substrates: MAP2 kinases also contain such motifs on their N-termini that are absolutely required for MAP2K-MAPK interaction and MAPK activation. Similarly, both dual-specificity MAP kinase phosphatases and MAP-specific tyrosine phosphatases bind to MAP kinases through the same docking site. D-motifs can even be found in certain MAPK pathway regulators and scaffolds (e.g. in the mammalian JIP proteins).

Other, less well characterised substrate-binding sites also exist. One such site (the DEF site) is formed by the activation loop (when in the active conformation) and the MAP kinase-specific insert below it. This site can accommodate peptides with an FxFP consensus sequence, typically downstream of the phosphorylation site. Note that the latter site can only be found in proteins that need to selectively recognize the active MAP kinases, thus they are almost exclusively found in substrates. Different motifs may cooperate with each other, as in the Elk family of transcription factors, that possess both a D-motif and an FxFP motif. The presence of an FxFP motif in the KSR1 scaffold protein also serves to make it an ERK1/2 substrate, providing a negative feedback mechanism to set the correct strength of ERK1/2 activation.

== Scaffold proteins ==
Since the discovery of Ste5 in yeast, scientists were on the hunt to discover similar non-enzymatic scaffolding pathway elements in mammals. There are indeed a number of proteins involved in ERK signaling, that can bind to multiple elements of the pathway: MP1 binds both MKK1/2 and ERK1/2, KSR1 and KSR2 can bind B-Raf or c-Raf, MKK1/2 and ERK1/2. Analogous proteins were also discovered for the JNK pathway: the JIP1/JIP2 and the JIP3/JIP4 families of proteins were all shown to bind MLKs, MKK7 and any JNK kinase. Unfortunately, unlike the yeast Ste5, the mechanisms by which they regulate MAPK activation are considerably less understood. While Ste5 actually forms a ternary complex with Ste7 and Fus3 to promote phosphorylation of the latter, known mammalian scaffold proteins appear to work by very different mechanisms. For example, KSR1 and KSR2 are actually MAP3 kinases and related to the Raf proteins. Although KSRs alone display negligible MAP3 kinase activity, KSR proteins can still participate in the activation of Raf kinases by forming side-to-side heterodimers with them, providing an allosteric pair to turn on each enzymes. JIPs on the other hand, are apparently transport proteins, responsible for enrichment of MAPK signaling components in certain compartments of polarized cells. In this context, JNK-dependent phosphorylation of JIP1 (and possibly JIP2) provides a signal for JIPs to release the JIP-bound and inactive upstream pathway components, thus driving a strong local positive feedback loop. This sophisticated mechanism couples kinesin-dependent transport to local JNK activation, not only in mammals, but also in the fruitfly Drosophila melanogaster.

== As therapeutic targets ==
Since the ERK signaling pathway is involved in both physiological and pathological cell proliferation, it is natural that ERK1/2 inhibitors would represent a desirable class of antineoplastic agents. Indeed, many of the proto-oncogenic "driver" mutations are tied to ERK1/2 signaling, such as constitutively active (mutant) receptor tyrosine kinases, Ras or Raf proteins. Although no MKK1/2 or ERK1/2 inhibitors were developed for clinical use, kinase inhibitors that also inhibit Raf kinases (e.g. Sorafenib) are successful antineoplastic agents against various types of cancer. MEK inhibitor cobimetinib has been investigated in pre-clinical lung cancer models in combination with inhibition of the PI3K pathway, where the two drugs lead to a synergistic response.

JNK kinases are implicated in the development of insulin resistance in obese individuals as well as neurotransmitter excitotoxicity after ischaemic conditions. Inhibition of JNK1 ameliorates insulin resistance in certain animal models. Mice that were genetically engineered to lack a functional JNK3 gene - the major isoform in brain – display enhanced ischemic tolerance and stroke recovery. Although small-molecule JNK inhibitors are under development, none of them proved to be effective in human tests yet. A peptide-based JNK inhibitor (AM-111, a retro-inverse D-motif peptide from JIP1, formerly known as XG-102) is also under clinical development for sensorineural hearing loss.

p38 was once believed to be a perfect target for anti-inflammatory drugs. Yet the failure of more than a dozen chemically different compounds in the clinical phase suggests that p38 kinases might be poor therapeutic targets in autoimmune diseases. Many of these compounds were found to be hepatotoxic to various degree and tolerance to the anti-inflammatory effect developed within weeks. An alternative approach is to evaluate the potential for targeting upstream MAPKs, such as ASK1. Studies in animal models of inflammatory arthritis have yielded promising results, and ASK1 has recently been found to be unique amongst the MAPKs in that it is inducible by inflammatory cytokines such as TNF-α.

== See also ==
- Signal transduction
- MAP kinase kinase
- MAP kinase kinase kinase
- MAP kinase kinase kinase kinase
- MAPK1 (ERK2)
- MAPK3 (ERK1)
- MAPK7 (ERK5)
- MAPK8 (JNK1)
- MAPK9 (JNK2)
- MAPK10 (JNK3)
- MAPK11 (p38-beta)
- MAPK12 (p38-gamma)
- MAPK13 (p38-delta)
- MAPK14 (p38-alpha)
- MAPK4 (ERK4: atypical MAPK)
- MAPK6 (ERK3: atypical MAPK)
- MAPK15 (ERK7/ERK8: atypical MAPK)
- NLK (Nemo-like kinase: atypical MAPK)
- ERK1/2 kinases
- ERK1/2 pathway
- JNK kinases
- p38 MAP kinases
- MEKK2 (MAP3K2)
- ASK1 (MAP3K5)
- MAPK networks
