= GADD45G =

Protein-coding gene in the species Homo sapiens

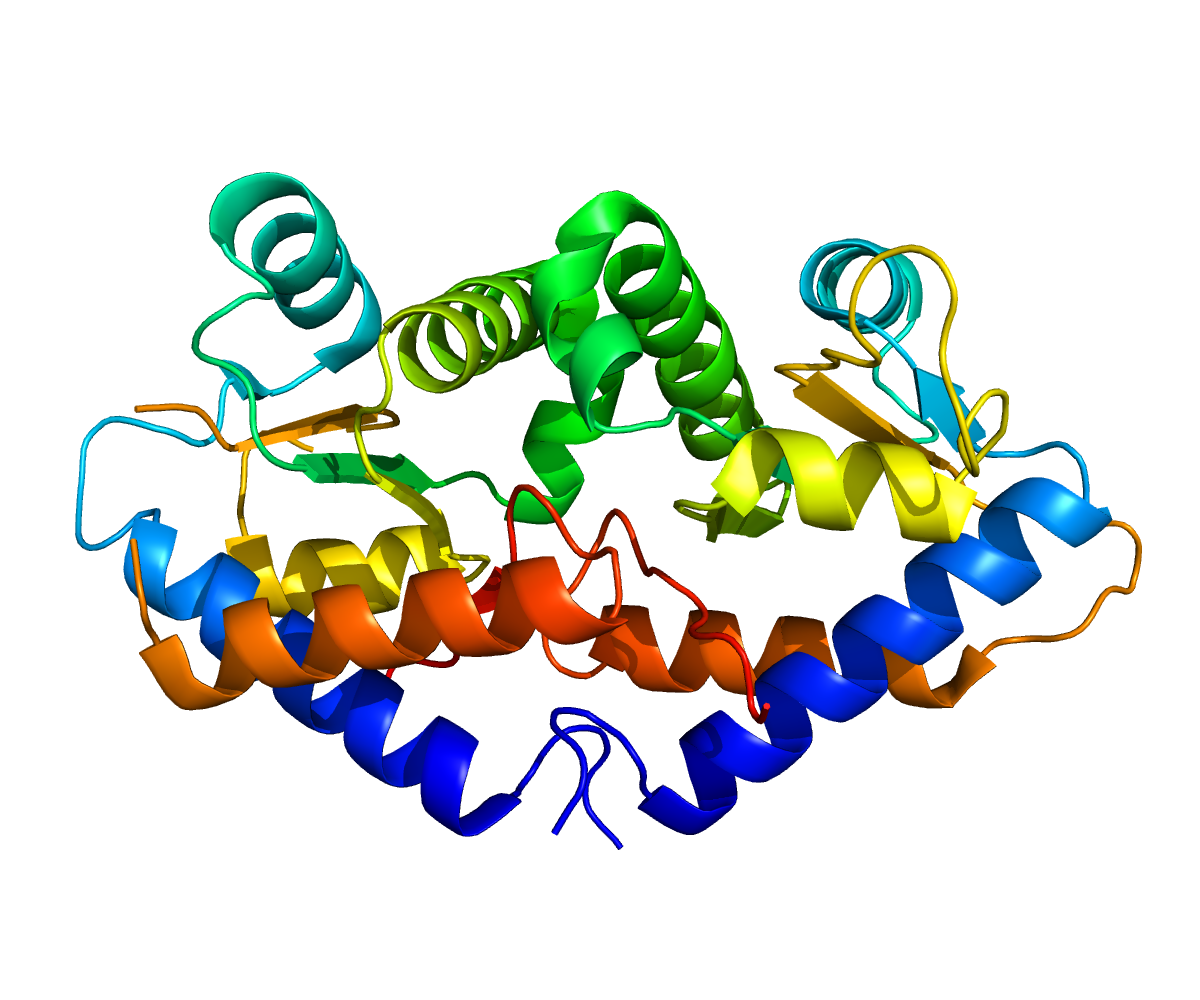

Identifiers
- Aliases: GADD45G, CR6, DDIT2, GADD45gamma, GRP17, growth arrest and DNA damage inducible gamma
- External IDs: OMIM: 604949; MGI: 1346325; GeneCards: GADD45G
Available structures
PDB	Ortholog search: PDBe RCSB
PDB	List of PDB id codes 2WAL, 3FFM

Gene location (Human)
Chr.	Chromosome 9 (human)
Band	9q22.2	Start	89,605,012 bp
Band	9q22.2	End	89,606,555 bp

Gene location (Mouse)
Chr.	Chromosome 13 (mouse)
Band	13|13 A5	Start	52,000,714 bp
Band	13|13 A5	End	52,002,504 bp
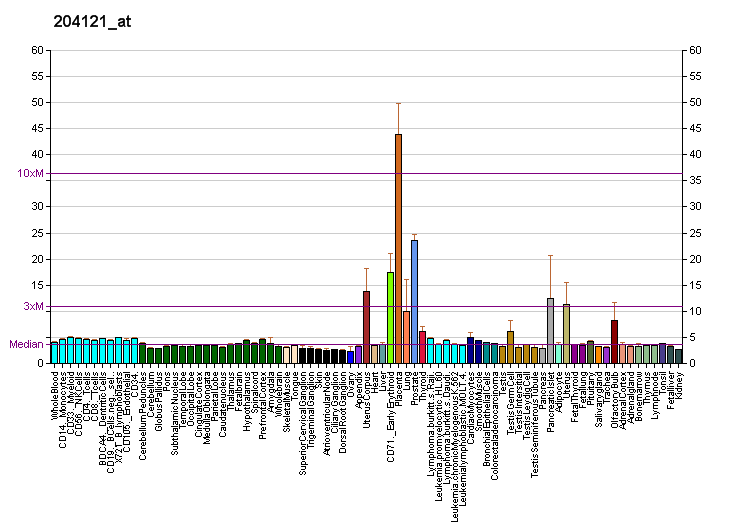
RNA expression pattern
Bgee	Human / Mouse (ortholog); Top expressed in: gastric mucosa; right auricle of heart; right lobe of liver; right adrenal cortex; left adrenal cortex; popliteal artery; tibial arteries; canal of the cervix; gastrocnemius muscle; muscle of thigh / Top expressed in: ventricular zone; decidua; saccule; muscle of thigh; granulocyte; islet of Langerhans; gastrula; sternocleidomastoid muscle; endothelial cell of lymphatic vessel; digastric muscle; More reference expression data
BioGPS	More reference expression data
Gene ontology
Molecular function	protein binding
Cellular component	nucleus; cytoplasm
Biological process	positive regulation of JNK cascade; multicellular organism development; positive regulation of apoptotic process; response to stress; cell differentiation; positive regulation of p38MAPK cascade; apoptotic process; regulation of cell cycle; positive regulation of cold-induced thermogenesis
Sources:Amigo / QuickGO
Orthologs
Databases	NCBI: entry; OMA: entry
Species	Human	Mouse
Entrez	10912	23882
Ensembl	ENSG00000130222	ENSMUSG00000021453
UniProt	O95257	Q9Z111; Q9R0S0
RefSeq (mRNA)	NM_006705	NM_011817
RefSeq (protein)	NP_006696	NP_035947
Location (UCSC)	Chr 9: 89.61 – 89.61 Mb	Chr 13: 52 – 52 Mb
PubMed search
- Wikidata
View/Edit Human	View/Edit Mouse

Growth arrest and DNA-damage-inducible protein GADD45 gamma is a protein that in humans is encoded by the GADD45G gene on chromosome 9. GADD45G is also known as CR6, DDIT2, GRP17, OIG37, and GADD45gamma. GADD45G is involved in several different processes, including sexual development, human-specific brain development, tumor suppression, and the cellular stress response. GADD45G interacts with several other proteins that are involved in DNA repair, cell cycle control, apoptosis, and senescence. Low expression of GADD45G has been associated with many types of cancer.

== History ==
GADD45G was originally cloned by Beadling under the name CR6 in 1993. In this experiment, several genes including GADD45G were noted for being induced by IL-2, and they were identified as immediate early response genes in T lymphocytes. Its role as a tumor suppressor was discovered in 1999 by Zhang. It received the name OIG37 from Nakayama due to its regulation by Oncostatin M, which was found to be able to inhibit growth. Finally, it also became known as Gadd-related protein 17 during its isolation from a cDNA library by Suzuki due to its homology with Gadd45.

== Structure and function ==
GADD45G is a member of a group of genes whose transcript levels are increased following stressful growth arrest conditions and treatment with DNA-damaging agents. The protein encoded by this gene responds to environmental stresses by mediating activation of the p38/JNK pathway via MTK1/MEKK4 kinase. GADD45G is in turn regulated upstream by NF-κB.

The crystal structure of GADD45G reveals a dimer made of four parallel helices. The central region contains a highly acidic patch where it allows for interaction with cdc2, PCNA, and p21. The parallel isoform of GADD45G is the active form.

This gene plays a role in cell cycle regulation. GADD45G prevents the kinase ability of the cyclin b1/Cdk1 complex in a fashion that does not break apart the complex. It plays a role in the activation of the S and G2/M checkpoints.

In the male sexual development pathway, GADD45G is essential for activating SRY, leading to proper formation of the gonads and sex-determination. This could occur through GADD45G interaction with the p38 MAPK signaling pathway.

Deletion of an enhancer close to the GADD45G gene is correlated to increased proliferation of neuronal cells, which could account for part of the difference in neural development between humans and other species. The deletion of the enhancer reduces the expression of the gene in the forebrain allowing for more brain growth in humans.

GADD45G is involved with dental epithelial cell proliferation. GADD45G is expressed in enamel knots, where it regulates gene expression and cell growth. The gene modulates p21-mediated epithelial cell proliferation by activating the p38 MAPK pathway during the development of teeth.

There is differential expression of the Xenopus homolog of GADD45G in embryonic development. It plays a large role in neural and brain development with GADD45A. GADD45G and GADD45A knockdowns are related to improper gastrulation, defective head growth, and shorter axes. GADD45G and GADD45A act redundantly to control cell growth, allow the cells to move from pluripotency helping cells differentiate.

=== Memory ===
During a learning experience, a set of genes is rapidly expressed in the brain. This induced gene expression is thought to be important for processing the information being learned. Such genes are known as immediate early genes. Within the prelimbic prefrontal cortex, the GADD45G gene is immediately expressed and is required for the consolidation of a type of learning in mice termed associative fear memory. In general, gene expression often can be epigenetically induced by demethylation of 5-methylcytosine(s) in gene promoter regions. The GADD45G protein functions in repair of DNA damage. GADD45G may also be involved in recognition of 5-methylcytosine as an alteration in DNA that needs to be repaired to allow induction of learning-related genes. Thus GADD45G may guide the rapid demethylation of methylcytosine in the promoter regions of learning-related genes by a DNA repair process(see also Epigenetics in learning and memory).

== Interactions ==
GADD45G carries out its many previously stated functions with many different interactions. GADD45G was found to inhibit Cdk1 kinase activity, which would cause disruption of cell growth. It also interacts with CRIF, which causes the inhibition of Cdc2-cyclin B1 and Cdk-cyclin E. GADD45 also works with the cyclin-dependent kinase inhibitor p21, which can cause growth arrest as well. GADD45G is found to be involved with the p38 MAPK pathway through interactions with MAP3K4, which can be important in sex-determination. Additionally, GADD45G regulates DNA replication and repair through its interactions with PCNA.

== Tissue distribution ==
In humans, GADD45G is expressed most in the skeletal muscle, kidney and liver. This gene has a low expression in the heart, brain, spleen, lung and testis. GADD45G is highly expressed in the placenta.

In the embryonic mouse, Gadd45g is expressed in the neural tube, cranial and dorsal root ganglia and the dorsal midbrain.

Mammalian renal inner medullary (IM) cells routinely face and resist hypertonic stress. Such stress causes DNA damage to which IM cells respond with cell cycle arrest. All three GADD45 isoforms GADD45A, GADD45B, and GADD45G are induced by acute hypertonicity in murine IM cells. Maximum induction occurs 16-18 h after the onset of hypertonicity. GADD45G is induced more strongly (7-fold) than GADD45B (3-fold) and GADD45A (2-fold). Hypertonicity of various forms (NaCl, KCl, sorbitol, or mannitol) always induces GADD45 transcripts, whereas non-hypertonic hyperosmolality (urea) has no effect. Actinomycin D does not prevent hypertonic GADD45 induction, indicating that mRNA stabilization is the mechanism that mediates this induction.

== Clinical significance ==
In numerous kinds of cancerous cells, GADD45G is down regulated. There is a low expression due to methylation of the GADD45G promoter. This low expression can also be explained by increased NF-κB activation.

GADD45G methylation is seen in many cancers. In esophageal cancer the expression level and methylation status of the gene are involved in the prognosis of esophageal squamous cell carcinoma. Demethylation of the gene can have some beneficial effects. Similar circumstances are seen in gastric cardio adenocarcinomas where GADD45G is silenced. GADD45G methylation levels are also measured in the diagnosis of pancreatic and colorectal cancers.

In the pituitary gland, GADD45G is a growth suppressor. There is a loss of expression of the gene in many pituitary cancerous masses. The gene plays a role in prostate cancer as a tumor suppressor as well. In these cancerous cells, Vitamin D can induce the expression of GADD45G. GADD45G could possibly be a target of therapeutic benefit for prostate cancer.

In cancerous liver cells, GADD45G is down regulated. It participates in negatively regulating the JAK-STAT3 signaling pathway. It acts as a tumor suppressor in HCC cells by promoting cell death or growth arrest. When GADD45G expression is low, liver cells may be able to bypass the growth arrest stage, leading to cancerous cells.

The presence of GADD45G in the urinary system is also related to renal disease. The renal cells expressing the gene were damaged.

The upregulation of Gadd45g due to hormones may account for the changes in the mouse uterus.

== See also ==
- Gadd45
- GADD45A
- GADD45B
