= GADD45GIP1 =

Protein-coding gene in the species Homo sapiens

Identifiers
- Aliases: GADD45GIP1, CKBBP2, CKbetaBP2, CRIF1, MRP-L59, PLINP, PLINP-1, PRG6, Plinp1, GADD45G interacting protein 1
- External IDs: OMIM: 605162; MGI: 1914947; GeneCards: GADD45GIP1
Available structures
PDB	Ortholog search: PDBe RCSB
PDB	List of PDB id codes 3J7Y, 3J9M

Gene location (Human)
Chr.	Chromosome 19 (human)
Band	19p13.13	Start	12,953,119 bp
Band	19p13.13	End	12,957,223 bp

Gene location (Mouse)
Chr.	Chromosome 8 (mouse)
Band	8|8 C3	Start	85,558,151 bp
Band	8|8 C3	End	85,562,111 bp
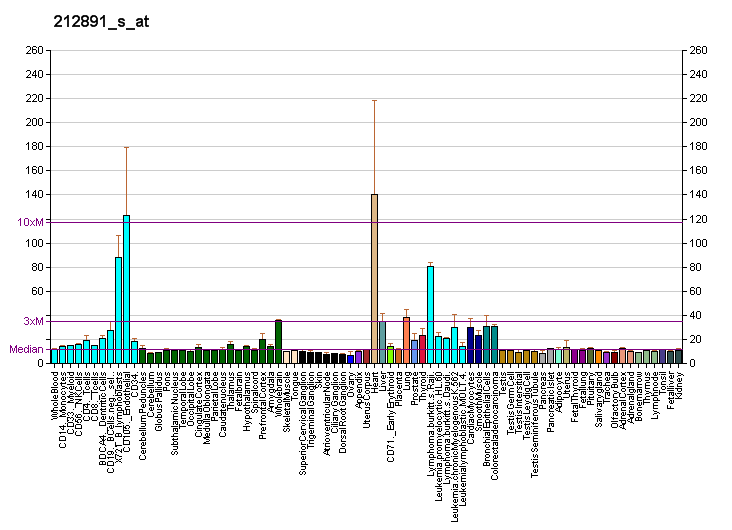
RNA expression pattern
Bgee	Human / Mouse (ortholog); Top expressed in: apex of heart; muscle of thigh; mucosa of transverse colon; left ventricle; gastrocnemius muscle; right auricle of heart; triceps brachii muscle; anterior cingulate cortex; olfactory zone of nasal mucosa; right adrenal gland / Top expressed in: left lobe of liver; primary oocyte; digastric muscle; extraocular muscle; interventricular septum; right ventricle; temporal muscle; myocardium of ventricle; sternocleidomastoid muscle; adrenal gland; More reference expression data
BioGPS	More reference expression data
Gene ontology
Molecular function	protein binding
Cellular component	mitochondrial matrix; mitochondrial ribosome; nucleus; mitochondrion; ribosome
Biological process	cell cycle; mitochondrial translational elongation; mitochondrial translational termination; viral process
Sources:Amigo / QuickGO
Orthologs
Databases	NCBI: entry; OMA: entry
Species	Human	Mouse
Entrez	90480	102060
Ensembl	ENSG00000179271	ENSMUSG00000033751
UniProt	Q8TAE8	Q9CR59
RefSeq (mRNA)	NM_052850	NM_183358
RefSeq (protein)	NP_443082	NP_899202
Location (UCSC)	Chr 19: 12.95 – 12.96 Mb	Chr 8: 85.56 – 85.56 Mb
PubMed search
- Wikidata
View/Edit Human	View/Edit Mouse

Growth arrest and DNA-damage-inducible proteins-interacting protein 1 is a protein that in humans is encoded by the GADD45GIP1 gene.

GADD45GIP1, also known as CRIF1 is newly identified de novo components in large subunit of mitoribosome. It is essential for the translation of mitochondrial oxidative phosphorylation (OXPHOS) polypeptides in mammalian mitochondria. CRIF1 interacts with low-sulfur (LSU) proteins, some of which surround the exit tunnel of the mitoribosome, and also interacts with nascent OXPHOS polypeptides and the mitochondrial-specific chaperone Tid1. The essential role of CRIF1 in mitochondrial synthesis and membrane integration of OXPHOS polypeptides was shown in brain-specific CRIF1-deficient mice, which exhibited profound OXPHOS failure and marked neurodegeneration.

== Interactions ==
GADD45GIP1 has been shown to interact with GADD45G, GADD45B and GADD45A.
