= SMYD3 =

Protein-coding gene in humans

Identifiers
- Aliases: SMYD3, KMT3E, ZMYND1, ZNFN3A1, bA74P14.1, SET and MYND domain containing 3
- External IDs: OMIM: 608783; MGI: 1916976; GeneCards: SMYD3
Available structures
PDB	Ortholog search: PDBe RCSB
PDB	List of PDB id codes 3MEK, 3OXF, 3OXG, 3OXL, 3PDN, 3QWP, 3RU0, 5CCL, 5CCM, 5EX0, 5EX3, 5HI7, 5HQ8
Enzyme activity
EC #	BRENDA	ExPASy	KEGG	MetaCyc
2.1.1.354	↗	↗	↗	↗

Gene location (Human)
Chr.	Chromosome 1 (human)
Band	1q44	Start	245,749,342 bp
Band	1q44	End	246,507,312 bp

Gene location (Mouse)
Chr.	Chromosome 1 (mouse)
Band	1 H4|1 83.48 cM	Start	178,779,525 bp
Band	1 H4|1 83.48 cM	End	179,345,606 bp
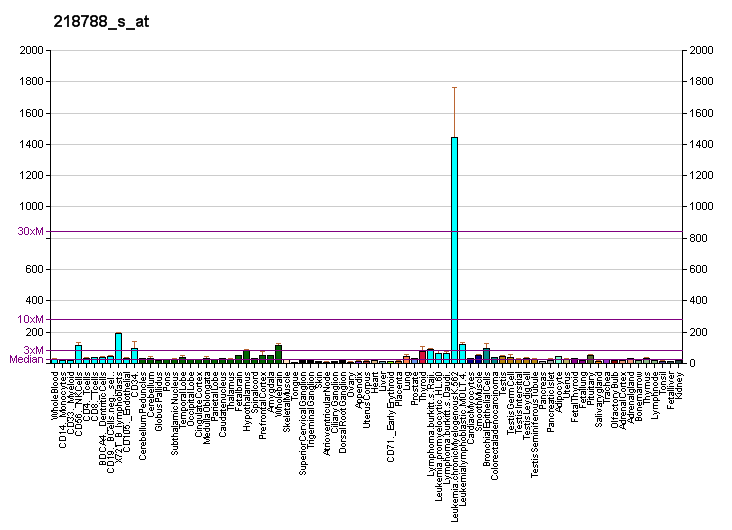
RNA expression pattern
Bgee	Human / Mouse (ortholog); Top expressed in: corpus epididymis; gonad; olfactory zone of nasal mucosa; stromal cell of endometrium; testicle; prefrontal cortex; Achilles tendon; cerebellar cortex; cerebellar hemisphere; epithelium of colon / Top expressed in: secondary oocyte; zygote; primary oocyte; blastocyst; morula; lumbar spinal ganglion; genital tubercle; otic vesicle; neural tube; tail of embryo; More reference expression data
BioGPS	More reference expression data
Gene ontology
Molecular function	metal ion binding; methyltransferase activity; transferase activity; RNA polymerase II complex binding; RNA polymerase II intronic transcription regulatory region sequence-specific DNA binding; protein binding; histone-lysine N-methyltransferase activity; RNA polymerase II cis-regulatory region sequence-specific DNA binding
Cellular component	cytoplasm; nucleus; nucleoplasm; cytosol
Biological process	cellular response to dexamethasone stimulus; nucleosome assembly; histone lysine methylation; methylation; myotube cell development; negative regulation of protein kinase activity; positive regulation of peptidyl-serine phosphorylation; positive regulation of transcription by RNA polymerase II; establishment of protein localization; chromatin organization
Sources:Amigo / QuickGO
Orthologs
Databases	NCBI: entry; OMA: entry
Species	Human	Mouse
Entrez	64754	69726
Ensembl	ENSG00000185420	ENSMUSG00000055067
UniProt	Q9H7B4	Q9CWR2
RefSeq (mRNA)	NM_001167740; NM_022743	NM_027188
RefSeq (protein)	NP_001161212; NP_073580; NP_001362891; NP_001362892; NP_001362894 NP_001362895	NP_081464
Location (UCSC)	Chr 1: 245.75 – 246.51 Mb	Chr 1: 178.78 – 179.35 Mb
PubMed search
- Wikidata
View/Edit Human	View/Edit Mouse

SET (Suppressor of variegation, Enhancer of Zeste, Trithorax) and MYND (myeloid-Nervy-DEAF-1) domain-containing protein 3 is a protein that in humans is encoded by the SMYD3 gene.

== Function ==
SMYD3 is a lysine methyltransferase which specifically methylates H3K4 and H4K5. SMYD3 plays a role in transcriptional regulation as a member of an RNA polymerase complex. It is also involved in cancer regulation.

== Expression ==
SMYD3 is predominantly expressed in skeletal muscles and the testis.

== Interactions ==
SMYD3 has been shown to interact with Heat shock protein 90kDa alpha (cytosolic), member A1 and POLR2A.

SMYD3 trimethylates a lysine residue on MAP3K2, which causes crosstalk into the MAP kinase signaling pathway in Ras-driven cancers.

== Link to cancer ==
SMYD3 plays an important role in the progression of cancers in humans. It is highly over expressed in a number of cancers such as liver, breast, and colorectal carcinomas. SMYD3 is known to play a role in lung, esophageal and prostate cancers also.

It has been noted that in lung and colorectal cancers, MAP3K2 methylation by SMYD3 ameliorates PPA2's inhibitory control, which leads to the overriding of apoptosis signals via the activation of the MEK/ERK signalling cascade. Meanwhile, in colon and liver cancers, SMYD3-mediated methylation of H3 promotes RNAP II recruitment and the associated transcription factors from proto-oncogenic regions.
