= MAP3K2 =

Protein-coding gene in the species Homo sapiens

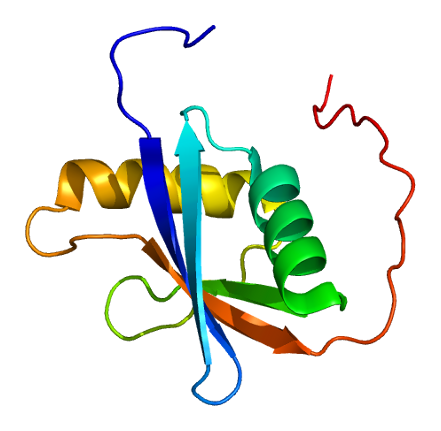

Identifiers
- Aliases: MAP3K2, MEKK2, MEKK2B, mitogen-activated protein kinase kinase kinase 2
- External IDs: OMIM: 609487; MGI: 1346873; GeneCards: MAP3K2
Available structures
PDB	Ortholog search: PDBe RCSB
PDB	List of PDB id codes 2CU1, 2NPT, 5EX0, 5HQ8
Enzyme activity
EC #	BRENDA	ExPASy	KEGG	MetaCyc
2.7.11.25	↗	↗	↗	↗

Gene location (Human)
Chr.	Chromosome 2 (human)
Band	2q14.3	Start	127,298,668 bp
Band	2q14.3	End	127,388,465 bp

Gene location (Mouse)
Chr.	Chromosome 18 (mouse)
Band	18|18 B1	Start	32,296,142 bp
Band	18|18 B1	End	32,369,804 bp
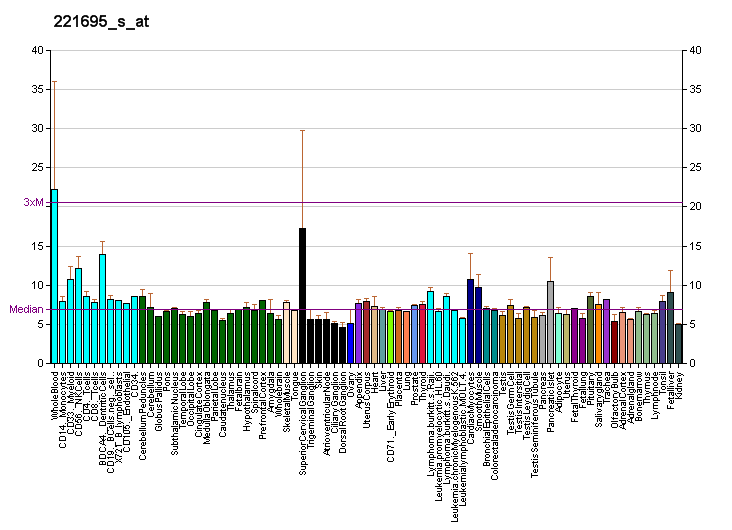
RNA expression pattern
Bgee	Human / Mouse (ortholog); Top expressed in: jejunal mucosa; mucosa of paranasal sinus; trabecular bone; tail of epididymis; caput epididymis; corpus epididymis; epithelium of nasopharynx; nipple; bronchial epithelial cell; pylorus / Top expressed in: Rostral migratory stream; renal corpuscle; medullary collecting duct; ciliary body; iris; substantia nigra; Paneth cell; cumulus cell; fossa; conjunctival fornix; More reference expression data
BioGPS	More reference expression data
Gene ontology
Molecular function	nucleotide binding; protein binding; protein kinase binding; kinase activity; ATP binding; protein serine/threonine kinase activity; transferase activity; MAP kinase kinase kinase activity; metal ion binding; protein kinase activity
Cellular component	nucleus; nucleoplasm; cytoplasm; cytosol
Biological process	phosphorylation; positive regulation of transcription, DNA-templated; cellular response to mechanical stimulus; protein phosphorylation; regulation of mitotic cell cycle; regulation of apoptotic process; signal transduction; stress-activated protein kinase signaling cascade; activation of protein kinase activity
Sources:Amigo / QuickGO
Orthologs
Databases	NCBI: entry; OMA: entry
Species	Human	Mouse
Entrez	10746	26405
Ensembl	ENSG00000169967	ENSMUSG00000024383
UniProt	Q9Y2U5	Q61083
RefSeq (mRNA)	NM_006609; NM_001371910; NM_001371911	NM_011946
RefSeq (protein)	NP_006600; NP_001358839; NP_001358840	NP_036076
Location (UCSC)	Chr 2: 127.3 – 127.39 Mb	Chr 18: 32.3 – 32.37 Mb
PubMed search
- Wikidata
View/Edit Human	View/Edit Mouse

Mitogen-Activated Protein Kinase Kinase Kinase 2 (MAP3K2), also known as MEKK2 (MEK/ERK Kinase 2), is an enzyme that in humans is encoded by the MAP3K2 gene.

== Function ==
MEKK2 is a member of serine/threonine protein kinase family. This kinase preferentially activates other kinases involved in the MAP kinase signaling pathway. MEKK2 kinase has been shown to directly phosphorylate and activate IkappaB kinases, and thus plays a role in NF-kappa B signaling pathway. MEKK2 has also been found to bind and activate protein kinase C-related kinase 2, which suggests its involvement in a regulated signaling process.

== Activation ==
MEKK2 is activated through homodimerization and subsequent trans-autophosphorylation at MEKK2-S519.

MEKK2 is regulated by 14-3-3 proteins which bind to MEKK2-phosphoT283.

MEKK2 is regulated by SMYD3 which binds and methylates MEKK2-K260.

== Interactions ==
MAP3K2 has been shown to interact with:

- MAPK8,
- MAP2K4,
- MAP2K5,
- MAP2K7,
- 14-3-3 protein,
- SMYD3,
- SH2D2A, and
- XIAP
