= SH2D2A =

Protein-coding gene in humans

Identifiers
- Aliases: SH2D2A, F2771, SCAP, TSAD, VRAP, SH2 domain containing 2A
- External IDs: OMIM: 604514; MGI: 1351596; GeneCards: SH2D2A

Gene location (Human)
Chr.	Chromosome 1 (human)
Band	1q23.1	Start	156,806,243 bp
Band	1q23.1	End	156,816,848 bp

Gene location (Mouse)
Chr.	Chromosome 3 (mouse)
Band	3 F1|3 38.78 cM	Start	87,754,062 bp
Band	3 F1|3 38.78 cM	End	87,763,029 bp
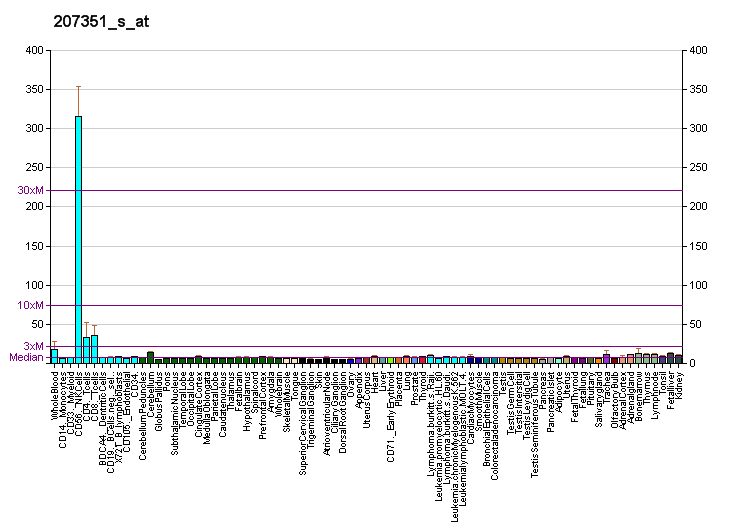
RNA expression pattern
Bgee	Human / Mouse (ortholog); Top expressed in: granulocyte; testicle; blood; gonad; spleen; appendix; epithelium of colon; lymph node; apex of heart; upper lobe of left lung / Top expressed in: thymus; blood; embryo; mesenteric lymph nodes; spleen; subcutaneous adipose tissue; hematopoietic cell; granulocyte; jejunum; islet of Langerhans; More reference expression data
BioGPS	More reference expression data
Gene ontology
Molecular function	SH3 domain binding; protein binding
Cellular component	cytoplasm; cytosol
Biological process	multicellular organism development; cell differentiation; vascular endothelial growth factor receptor signaling pathway; cell population proliferation; angiogenesis; signal transduction; positive regulation of signal transduction
Sources:Amigo / QuickGO
Orthologs
Databases	NCBI: entry; OMA: entry
Species	Human	Mouse
Entrez	9047	27371
Ensembl	ENSG00000027869	ENSMUSG00000028071
UniProt	Q9NP31	Q9QXK9
RefSeq (mRNA)	NM_001161441; NM_001161442; NM_001161443; NM_001161444; NM_003975	NM_001025571; NM_021309
RefSeq (protein)	NP_001154913; NP_001154914; NP_001154915; NP_001154916; NP_003966	NP_001020742; NP_067284
Location (UCSC)	Chr 1: 156.81 – 156.82 Mb	Chr 3: 87.75 – 87.76 Mb
PubMed search
- Wikidata
View/Edit Human	View/Edit Mouse

SH2 domain-containing protein 2A is a protein that in humans is encoded by the SH2D2A gene.

== Interactions ==
SH2D2A has been shown to interact with MAP3K2.
