= MAPK4 =

Protein-coding gene in the species Homo sapiens

Identifiers
- Aliases: MAPK4, ERK-4, ERK4, PRKM4, p63-MAPK, p63MAPK, mitogen-activated protein kinase 4
- External IDs: OMIM: 176949; MGI: 2444559; GeneCards: MAPK4
Enzyme activity
EC #	BRENDA	ExPASy	KEGG	MetaCyc
2.7.11.24	↗	↗	↗	↗

Gene location (Human)
Chr.	Chromosome 18 (human)
Band	18q21.1-q21.2	Start	50,560,087 bp
Band	18q21.1-q21.2	End	50,731,826 bp

Gene location (Mouse)
Chr.	Chromosome 18 (mouse)
Band	18|18 E2	Start	73,928,486 bp
Band	18|18 E2	End	74,065,359 bp
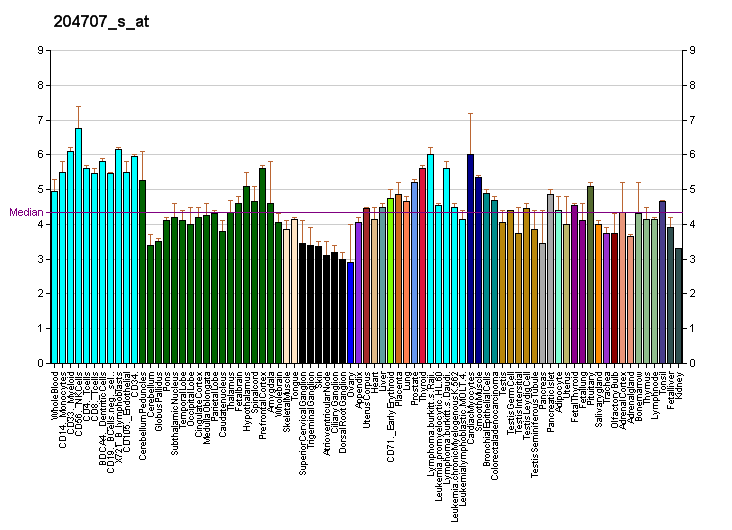
RNA expression pattern
Bgee	Human / Mouse (ortholog); Top expressed in: caudate nucleus; nucleus accumbens; right frontal lobe; anterior cingulate cortex; putamen; right adrenal cortex; right hemisphere of cerebellum; left adrenal cortex; amygdala; prefrontal cortex / Top expressed in: olfactory tubercle; habenula; visual cortex; Epithelium of choroid plexus; superior frontal gyrus; primary visual cortex; primary motor cortex; prefrontal cortex; globus pallidus; cingulate gyrus; More reference expression data
BioGPS	More reference expression data
Gene ontology
Molecular function	protein serine/threonine kinase activity; ATP binding; kinase activity; protein heterodimerization activity; nucleotide binding; protein kinase binding; protein homodimerization activity; protein kinase activity; transferase activity; protein binding; MAP kinase activity
Cellular component	cytosol; nucleoplasm; nucleus; cytoplasm
Biological process	protein phosphorylation; cell cycle; phosphorylation; MAPK cascade; regulation of gene expression; cellular response to organic substance; intracellular signal transduction
Sources:Amigo / QuickGO
Orthologs
Databases	NCBI: entry; OMA: entry
Species	Human	Mouse
Entrez	5596	225724
Ensembl	ENSG00000141639; ENSG00000282110	ENSMUSG00000024558
UniProt	P31152	Q6P5G0
RefSeq (mRNA)	NM_001292039; NM_001292040; NM_002747	NM_172632; NM_001360936
RefSeq (protein)	NP_001278968; NP_001278969; NP_002738	NP_766220; NP_001347865
Location (UCSC)	Chr 18: 50.56 – 50.73 Mb	Chr 18: 73.93 – 74.07 Mb
PubMed search
- Wikidata
View/Edit Human	View/Edit Mouse

Mitogen-activated protein kinase 4 is an enzyme that in humans is encoded by the MAPK4 gene.

Mitogen-activated protein kinase 4 is a member of the mitogen-activated protein kinase family. Tyrosine kinase growth factor receptors activate mitogen-activated protein kinases which then translocate into the nucleus where it phosphorylates nuclear targets.

The Arabidopsis MAPK4 is important in signalling

Mechanistically, MAPK4 directly bound and activated AKT by phosphorylation of the activation loop at threonine 308. It also activated mTORC2 to phosphorylate AKT at serine 473 for full activation. MAPK4 overexpression induced oncogenic outcomes, including transforming prostate epithelial cells into anchorage-independent growth, and MAPK4 knockdown inhibited cancer cell proliferation, anchorage-independent growth, and xenograft growth.
