= MAPK7 =

Protein-coding gene in the species Homo sapiens

Identifiers
- Aliases: MAPK7, BMK1, ERK4, ERK5, PRKM7, mitogen-activated protein kinase 7
- External IDs: OMIM: 602521; MGI: 1346347; GeneCards: MAPK7
Available structures
PDB	Ortholog search: PDBe RCSB
PDB	List of PDB id codes 2Q8Y, 4B99, 4IC7, 4IC8, 4ZSJ, 4ZSL, 5BYZ, 5BYY, 4ZSG
Enzyme activity
EC #	BRENDA	ExPASy	KEGG	MetaCyc
2.7.11.24	↗	↗	↗	↗

Gene location (Human)
Chr.	Chromosome 17 (human)
Band	17p11.2	Start	19,377,721 bp
Band	17p11.2	End	19,383,544 bp

Gene location (Mouse)
Chr.	Chromosome 11 (mouse)
Band	11|11 B2	Start	61,488,812 bp
Band	11|11 B2	End	61,494,406 bp
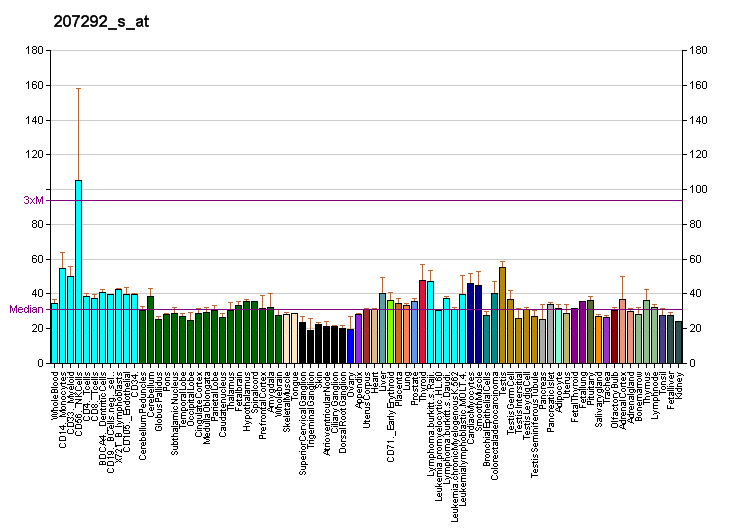

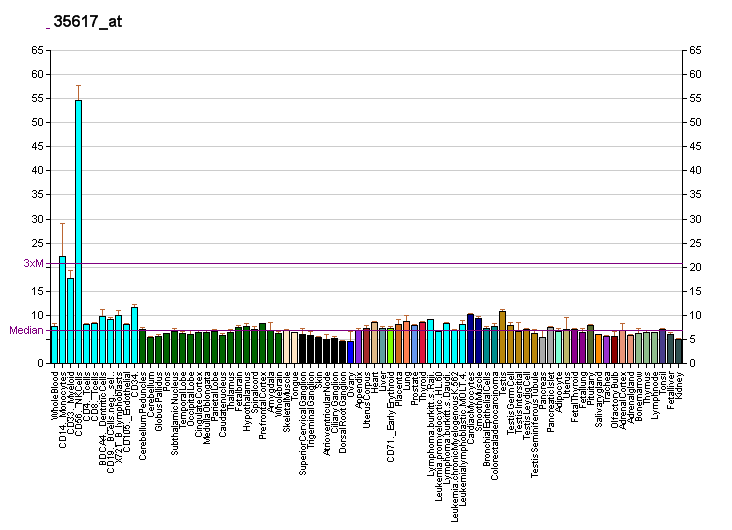
RNA expression pattern
Bgee	Human / Mouse (ortholog); Top expressed in: ganglionic eminence; stromal cell of endometrium; popliteal artery; tibial arteries; sural nerve; ventricular zone; ectocervix; granulocyte; right ovary; skin of leg / Top expressed in: granulocyte; tail of embryo; genital tubercle; ventricular zone; neural tube; epiblast; ganglionic eminence; yolk sac; internal carotid artery; external carotid artery; More reference expression data
BioGPS	More reference expression data
Gene ontology
Molecular function	transferase activity; nucleotide binding; protein kinase activity; mitogen-activated protein kinase binding; kinase activity; protein binding; ATP binding; protein serine/threonine kinase activity; MAP kinase activity
Cellular component	cytoplasm; cytosol; PML body; nucleoplasm; nucleus
Biological process	cellular response to transforming growth factor beta stimulus; negative regulation of endothelial cell apoptotic process; cell differentiation; phosphorylation; negative regulation of ERK5 cascade; cellular response to laminar fluid shear stress; positive regulation of transcription from RNA polymerase II promoter in response to stress; cellular response to growth factor stimulus; negative regulation of apoptotic process; regulation of angiogenesis; negative regulation of response to cytokine stimulus; protein phosphorylation; negative regulation of MAP kinase activity; peptidyl-serine phosphorylation; cell cycle; negative regulation of cyclic-nucleotide phosphodiesterase activity; negative regulation of heterotypic cell-cell adhesion; negative regulation of oxidative stress-induced intrinsic apoptotic signaling pathway; negative regulation of extrinsic apoptotic signaling pathway in absence of ligand; negative regulation of inflammatory response; cAMP-mediated signaling; signal transduction; positive regulation of transcription by RNA polymerase II; cellular response to hydrogen peroxide; MAPK cascade; axon guidance; negative regulation of calcineurin-NFAT signaling cascade; regulation of gene expression; intracellular signal transduction; cellular response to organic substance
Sources:Amigo / QuickGO
Orthologs
Databases	NCBI: entry; OMA: entry
Species	Human	Mouse
Entrez	5598	23939
Ensembl	ENSG00000166484	ENSMUSG00000001034
UniProt	Q13164	Q9WVS8
RefSeq (mRNA)	NM_002749; NM_139032; NM_139033; NM_139034	NM_001291033; NM_001291034; NM_001291035; NM_001291036; NM_001291037 NM_011841; NM_001361989
RefSeq (protein)	NP_002740; NP_620601; NP_620602; NP_620603	NP_001277962; NP_001277963; NP_001277964; NP_001277965; NP_001277966 NP_035971; NP_001348918
Location (UCSC)	Chr 17: 19.38 – 19.38 Mb	Chr 11: 61.49 – 61.49 Mb
PubMed search
- Wikidata
View/Edit Human	View/Edit Mouse

Mitogen-activated protein kinase 7 also known as MAP kinase 7 is an enzyme that in humans is encoded by the MAPK7 gene.

== Function ==
MAPK7 is a member of the MAP kinase family. MAP kinases act as an integration point for multiple biochemical signals, and are involved in a wide variety of cellular processes such as proliferation, differentiation, transcription regulation and development. MAPK7 is also referred to as ERK5 or BMK (Big MAPK) due to its large size which is around double that of other ERKs. This kinase is specifically activated by mitogen-activated protein kinase kinase 5 (MAP2K5/MEK5). It is involved in the downstream signaling processes of various receptor molecules including receptor tyrosine kinases, and G protein-coupled receptors. In response to extracellular signals, this kinase translocates to the cell nucleus, where it regulates gene expression by phosphorylating, and activating different transcription factors. Four alternatively spliced transcript variants of this gene encoding two distinct isoforms have been reported.

MAPK7 is also critical for cardiovascular development and is essential for endothelial cell function.

== Interactions ==
MAPK7 has been shown to interact with:

- C-Raf,
- Gap junction protein, alpha 1
- MAP2K5,
- MEF2C,
- MEF2D,
- PTPRR,
- SGK, and
- YWHAB.

== ERK5 (= MAPK7) Inhibitors ==
XMD8-92 was one of the first described ERK5 inhibitors and was used in several pharmacological studies as tool compound. However, XMD8-92 hits BRD4 as an off-target leading to false or inconclusive results. Consequently, ERK5 inhibitors with improved selectivity (void of the BRD4 off-target effect) such as AX15836 and BAY-885 were developed and should preferably be used for future pharmacological studies. BAY-885 fulfils the quality criteria for a 'Donated Chemical Probe' as defined by the Structural Genomics Consortium. In 2020, it was demonstrated that ATP-competitive inhibitors paradoxically activate ERK5 signalling. A recent review discussed the modulation of ERK5 activity as a therapeutic anti-cancer strategy.

== ERK5 (= MAPK7) Degrader ==
Based on a close analog of the ERK5 inhibitor BAY-885 the Proteolysis Targeting Chimera (PROTAC) INY-06-061 was developed which allows to compare the phenotypes resulting from ERK5 inhibition versus degradation.
