= MAPK15 =

Protein-coding gene in humans

Identifiers
- Aliases: MAPK15, ERK7, ERK8, mitogen-activated protein kinase 15
- External IDs: MGI: 2652894; GeneCards: MAPK15
Enzyme activity
EC #	BRENDA	ExPASy	KEGG	MetaCyc
2.7.11.24	↗	↗	↗	↗

Gene location (Human)
Chr.	Chromosome 8 (human)
Band	8q24.3	Start	143,716,340 bp
Band	8q24.3	End	143,722,458 bp

Gene location (Mouse)
Chr.	Chromosome 15 (mouse)
Band	15|15 D3	Start	75,865,618 bp
Band	15|15 D3	End	75,871,003 bp
RNA expression pattern
Bgee	Human / Mouse (ortholog); Top expressed in: right uterine tube; olfactory zone of nasal mucosa; left testis; right testis; left lobe of thyroid gland; left uterine tube; right lobe of thyroid gland; right lung; anterior pituitary; skin of abdomen / Top expressed in: spermatocyte; choroidal fissure; rib; right kidney; spermatid; seminiferous tubule; proximal tubule; islet of Langerhans; embryo; embryo; More reference expression data
BioGPS	n/a
Gene ontology
Molecular function	transferase activity; nucleotide binding; SH3 domain binding; MAP kinase activity; protein serine/threonine kinase activity; protein binding; ATP binding; protein kinase activity; kinase activity; chromatin binding
Cellular component	intracellular anatomical structure; extracellular region; nucleus; cytoplasm; autophagosome; centriole; cell-cell junction; axoneme; ciliary basal body; Golgi apparatus; meiotic spindle; spindle; cytoskeleton; bicellular tight junction; cell junction; cytoplasmic vesicle; cell projection
Biological process	positive regulation of telomere capping; phosphorylation; positive regulation of telomere maintenance via telomerase; protein phosphorylation; positive regulation of telomerase activity; MAPK cascade; protein autophosphorylation; regulation of gene expression; regulation of autophagy; protein localization to ciliary transition zone; regulation of COPII vesicle coating; endoplasmic reticulum organization; negative regulation of cell migration; dopamine uptake; regulation of cilium assembly; positive regulation of metaphase/anaphase transition of meiosis I; positive regulation of spindle assembly; cellular response to DNA damage stimulus; positive regulation of cell population proliferation; intracellular signal transduction
Sources:Amigo / QuickGO
Orthologs
Databases	NCBI: entry; OMA: entry
Species	Human	Mouse
Entrez	225689	332110
Ensembl	ENSG00000181085; ENSG00000274205	ENSMUSG00000063704
UniProt	Q8TD08	Q80Y86
RefSeq (mRNA)	NM_139021	NM_177922
RefSeq (protein)	NP_620590	NP_808590
Location (UCSC)	Chr 8: 143.72 – 143.72 Mb	Chr 15: 75.87 – 75.87 Mb
PubMed search
- Wikidata
View/Edit Human	View/Edit Mouse

Mitogen-activated protein kinase 15, also known as MAPK15, ERK7, or ERK8, is an enzyme that in humans is encoded by the MAPK15 gene.

Evolutionarily, MAPK15 is conserved in a number of species, including P. troglodytes, B. taurus, M. musculus, R. norvegicus, D. rerio, D. melanogaster, C. elegans, and X. laevis.

== Function ==
The protein encoded by this gene is a member of the MAP (mitogen-activated protein) kinase family. MAP kinases are also known as extracellular signal-regulated kinases (ERKs), and are involved in signaling cascades that regulate a number of cellular processes, including proliferation, differentiation, and transcriptional regulation. MAPK15 is often referred to as ERK7 or ERK8, and the latter two share 69% amino acid sequence similarity; at least one study has suggested that the two are, in fact, distinct proteins.

In vertebrate models, ERK8 is not constitutively active, and exhibits relatively low basal kinase activity. It contains two SH3 (SRC homology 3) binding motifs in its C-terminal region, and is likely activated by an SRC-dependent signaling pathway. SRC is a non-receptor tyrosine kinase (and proto-oncogene) that has been implicated in cancer growth and progression in humans when it is overexpressed. The exact function of MAPK15 is unknown, though a number of studies have implicated the enzyme in various cellular pathways.

Specifically, MAPK15 expression is significantly reduced in human lung and breast carcinomas, and MAPK15 down-regulation is correlated with increased cell motility. MAPK15 has also been found to negatively regulate protein O-glycosylation with acetyl galactosamine (GalNAc), a process in which a sugar molecule is covalently attached to an oxygen atom on an amino acid residue. Mammalian MAPK15 is a putative regulator of the cellular localization and transcriptional activity of estrogen-related receptor alpha (ERRa), as well as an inhibitor of proliferating cell nuclear antigen (PCNA) degradation. PCNA is critical for DNA replication, and is an essential factor in protecting genome stability. MAPK15 has also been shown to regulate ciliogenesis in X. laevis (African clawed frog) embryos by phosphorylating an actin regulator called CapZIP.

== Interactions ==
MAPK15 has been demonstrated to interact with gamma-aminobutyric acid receptor-associated protein (GABARAP) and microtubule-associated proteins 1A/1B light chain 3A (MAP1LC3A, or LC3) in a process that stimulates autophagy. A number of additional proteins also interact with MAPK15, including cyclin-dependent kinase 2 (CDK2), mitogen-activated protein kinase 12 (MAPK12), and lactotransferrin (LTF), among many others.

== Clinical significance ==
Due to its role in protecting genomic integrity and cell motility, MAPK15 has been identified as a potential target for cancer therapeutics. Additionally, given the putative role that MAPK15 plays in the regulation of ciliogenesis, it may be an ideal target for diseases related to human ciliary defects (often called ciliopathies).
