= GADD45B =

Protein-coding gene in the species Homo sapiens

Identifiers
- Aliases: GADD45B, GADD45BETA, MYD118, growth arrest and DNA damage inducible beta
- External IDs: OMIM: 604948; MGI: 107776; HomoloGene: 7433; GeneCards: GADD45B; OMA:GADD45B - orthologs

Gene location (Human)
Chr.	Chromosome 19 (human)
Band	19p13.3	Start	2,476,122 bp
Band	19p13.3	End	2,478,259 bp

Gene location (Mouse)
Chr.	Chromosome 10 (mouse)
Band	10 C1|10 39.72 cM	Start	80,765,907 bp
Band	10 C1|10 39.72 cM	End	80,768,038 bp
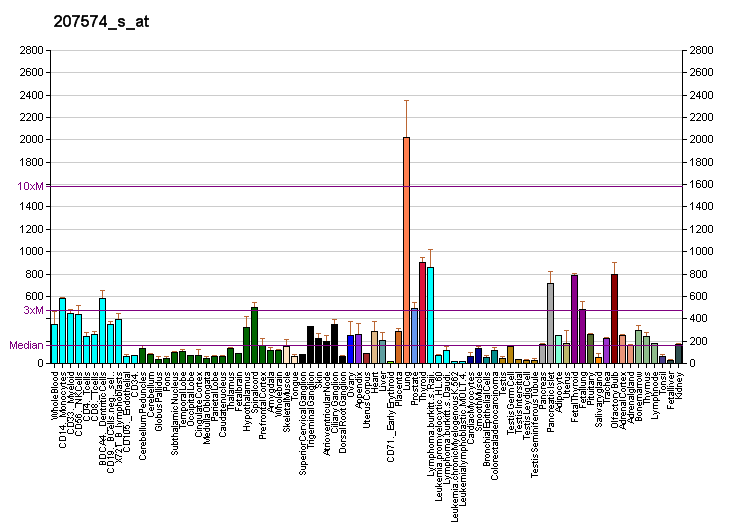

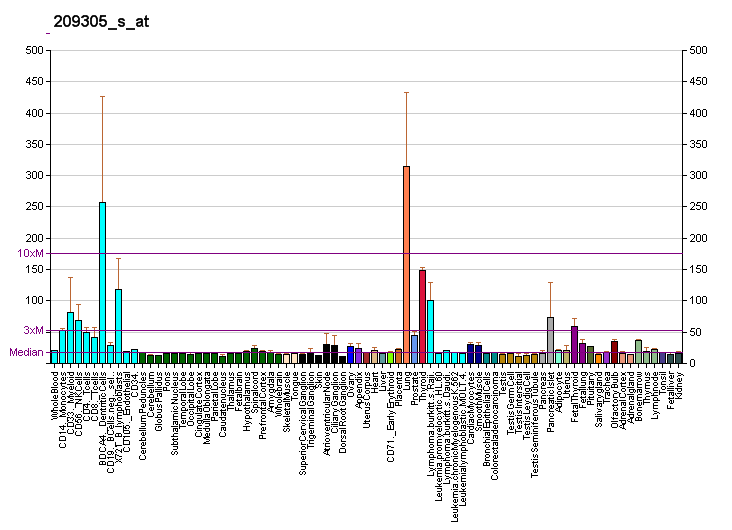

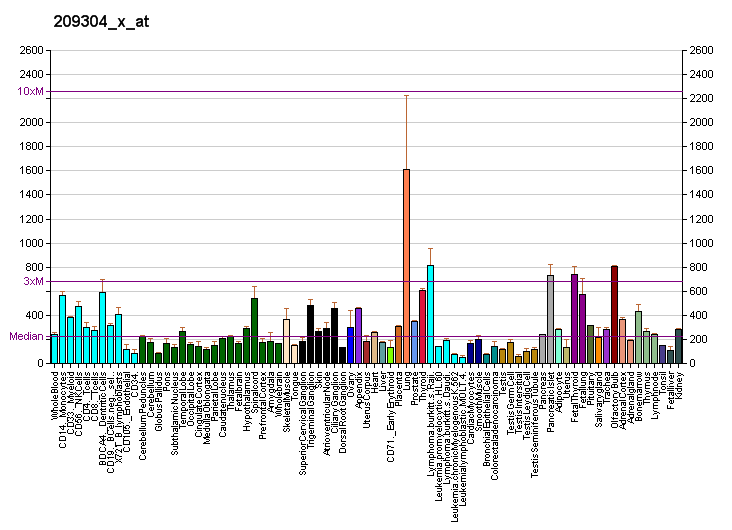
RNA expression pattern
Bgee	Human / Mouse (ortholog); Top expressed in: vena cava; gastric mucosa; saphenous vein; tibial arteries; left uterine tube; ascending aorta; pericardium; pancreatic ductal cell; right lobe of thyroid gland; right auricle of heart / Top expressed in: superior surface of tongue; gallbladder; granulocyte; internal carotid artery; external carotid artery; fossa; condyle; molar; mesenteric lymph nodes; decidua; More reference expression data
BioGPS	More reference expression data
Gene ontology
Molecular function	protein binding
Cellular component	cytoplasm; nucleus
Biological process	multicellular organism development; positive regulation of apoptotic process; positive regulation of p38MAPK cascade; response to stress; cell differentiation; positive regulation of JNK cascade; negative regulation of protein kinase activity; apoptotic process; regulation of cell cycle
Sources:Amigo / QuickGO
Orthologs
Species	Human	Mouse
Entrez	4616	17873
Ensembl	ENSG00000099860	ENSMUSG00000015312
UniProt	O75293	P22339
RefSeq (mRNA)	NM_015675	NM_008655
RefSeq (protein)	NP_056490	NP_032681
Location (UCSC)	Chr 19: 2.48 – 2.48 Mb	Chr 10: 80.77 – 80.77 Mb
PubMed search
- Wikidata
View/Edit Human	View/Edit Mouse

Growth arrest and DNA-damage-inducible, beta, also known as GADD45B, is a protein which in humans is encoded by the GADD45B gene.

== Function ==
This gene is a member of a group of genes whose transcript levels are increased following stressful growth arrest conditions and treatment with DNA-damaging agents. The genes in this group respond to environmental stresses by mediating activation of the p38/JNK pathway. This activation is mediated via their proteins binding and activating MTK1/MEKK4 kinase, which is an upstream activator of both p38 and JNK MAPKs. The function of these genes or their protein products is involved in the regulation of growth and apoptosis. These genes are regulated by different mechanisms, but they are often coordinately expressed and can function cooperatively in inhibiting cell growth.

Gadd45b is required for activity-induced DNA demethylation of specific promoters and expression of corresponding genes necessary for adult neurogenesis, including brain-derived neurotrophic factor and fibroblast growth factor. Hence GADD45B is implicated in affecting synaptic plasticity.

== Interactions ==
GADD45B has been shown to interact with:

- ASK1,
- GADD45GIP1,
- MAP2K7 and
- MAP3K4.

== See also ==
- Gadd45
