= NLK =

Mammalian protein found in Homo sapiens

Identifiers
- Aliases: NLK, nemo like kinase
- External IDs: OMIM: 609476; MGI: 1201387; GeneCards: NLK
Enzyme activity
EC #	BRENDA	ExPASy	KEGG	MetaCyc
2.7.11.24	↗	↗	↗	↗

Gene location (Human)
Chr.	Chromosome 17 (human)
Band	17q11.2	Start	28,041,737 bp
Band	17q11.2	End	28,196,381 bp

Gene location (Mouse)
Chr.	Chromosome 11 (mouse)
Band	11|11 B5	Start	78,457,994 bp
Band	11|11 B5	End	78,588,199 bp
RNA expression pattern
Bgee	Human / Mouse (ortholog); Top expressed in: middle temporal gyrus; Brodmann area 23; endothelial cell; retinal pigment epithelium; primary visual cortex; parietal lobe; superior frontal gyrus; postcentral gyrus; entorhinal cortex; internal globus pallidus / Top expressed in: Rostral migratory stream; retinal pigment epithelium; pineal gland; prefrontal cortex; medial ganglionic eminence; habenula; olfactory tubercle; substantia nigra; cumulus cell; stria vascularis; More reference expression data
BioGPS	n/a
Gene ontology
Molecular function	transferase activity; nucleotide binding; transcription factor binding; metal ion binding; kinase activity; protein binding; ubiquitin protein ligase binding; protein serine/threonine kinase activity; SH2 domain binding; ATP binding; protein kinase activity; magnesium ion binding; MAP kinase activity
Cellular component	cytosol; nucleoplasm; nucleus; cytoplasm
Biological process	phosphorylation; protein stabilization; Wnt signaling pathway; transcription, DNA-templated; MAPK cascade; protein autophosphorylation; transforming growth factor beta receptor signaling pathway; Wnt signaling pathway, calcium modulating pathway; regulation of transcription, DNA-templated; negative regulation of Wnt signaling pathway; protein phosphorylation; peptidyl-threonine phosphorylation; regulation of gene expression; serine phosphorylation of STAT protein; intracellular signal transduction
Sources:Amigo / QuickGO
Orthologs
Databases	NCBI: entry; OMA: entry
Species	Human	Mouse
Entrez	51701	18099
Ensembl	ENSG00000087095	ENSMUSG00000017376
UniProt	Q9UBE8	O54949
RefSeq (mRNA)	NM_016231	NM_008702
RefSeq (protein)	NP_057315	NP_032728
Location (UCSC)	Chr 17: 28.04 – 28.2 Mb	Chr 11: 78.46 – 78.59 Mb
PubMed search
- Wikidata
View/Edit Human	View/Edit Mouse

Serine/threonine protein kinase NLK is an enzyme that in humans is encoded by the NLK gene. Its name is an abbreviation for Nemo-Like Kinase, Nemo (nmo) being the Drosophila ortholog of the mammalian NLK gene. This enzyme is a member of the Mitogen-activated protein kinase (MAPK) family, although not explicitly designated as such (it does not even have a numbered MAPK code). It is a highly divergent, atypical member of the MAPK group, lacking most features so characteristic of most mitogen-activated protein kinases (e.g. it does not have the dual phosphorylation motifs of typical MAPKs, and is not phosphorylated by any known MAP2 kinases). Its activation mechanism and downstream targets are still not well characterized.
