= MAPK networks =

Mitogen-activated protein kinase (MAPK) networks are the pathways and signaling of MAPK, which is a type of serine/threonine-specific protein kinase. MAPK pathways have both a positive and negative regulation in plants. A positive regulation of MAPK networks is to help in assisting with stresses from the environment. A negative regulation of MAPK networks is pertaining to a high quantity of reactive oxygen species (ROS) in the plant.

== MAPK networks ==
Mitogen-activated protein kinase (MAPK) networks can be found in eukaryotic cells. MAPK pathways in plants are known to regulate cell growth, cell development, cell death, and cell responses to environmental stimuli. Only a few of the MAPK mechanism components are known and have been studied. The components such as Arabidopsis MAPKKKs YODA, ANP2/ANP3, and MP3K6/MP3K7 functions in the development of the cell. MEKK1 and ANP1 function in the response to environmental stress. Unfortunately, only eight out of the twenty mitogen-activated protein kinases have been studied. The most commonly studied MAPKs are MPK3, MPK4, and MPK6, which are activated by a diversity of stimuli including abiotic stresses, pathogens, and oxidative stressors. MPK4 negatively regulates biotic stress signaling, while MPK3 and MPK6 function as positive mediators of defense responses. The plant has these positive and negative mediators allowing for normal plant growth and development, which has been proven true by the severely dwarfed phenotype of mpk4 and the embryo lethal phenotype of mpk3 and mpk6 mutants.

== Positive regulation pathways in plants ==
Plants have many protection mechanisms to cope with stresses from the environment, which include ultraviolet light, cold or hot weather, windy days, and mechanical wounding. There are multiple pathways, but one pathway that plants have been able to develop is a self-defense mechanism by recognize pathogens through pathogen-associated molecular patterns (PAMPs) via cell surface-located pathogen-recognition receptors. These receptors induce intracellular signal pathways within the plant cells, while also resulting in PAMP-triggered immunity. Responses to PAMPs target broadly instead of specifically. This immunity requires downstream components via the MAPK cascade to activate the MAP kinases. The flagellin, a peptide of flg22, triggers a rapid and strong activation of MPK3, MPK4, and MPK6. MPK4 and MPK6 can be activated by harpin proteins. MPK3 and MPK6 are very similar proteins and have a function as regulators in abscission, stomatal development, signaling various abiotic stresses, and defense responses to certain pathogens. Experimentation has proposed that the MAPK module MEKK1-MKK4/MKK5-MPK3/MPK6 may be responsible for flg22 signal transmission. All of the proposed modules appear to be correct expect for MEKK1 because plants with mekk1 mutated have a compromised flg22-triggered activation of MPK4, yet they have normal activation of MPK3 and MPK6. Data has shown that MAPK cascade is composed of MKK4/MKK5 and MPK3/MPK6 in response to fungal pathogens. The observation shows that the activation of MPK3/MPK6 in conditional gain-of-function plants for MKK4/MKK5 or MEKK1/MKKKa is sufficient to induce camalexin, which is a major phytoalexin in Arabidopsis. The stomata are considered to be the entry point for pathogenic invaders because microbial invaders enter the plant at the stomata. A recent study has shown that MAPK cascades play a role in abiotic and biotic stress responses. The main pathways in stomatal development and dynamics are MPK3 and MPK6. During a drought, the stomata closes and is believed to be mediated by the phytohormone, abscisic acid, and involves MKK1, MPK3, and MPK6. Another way of closing the stomata is through a closing process that is called pathogen-induced, which is an innate response from the plant. Campestris (Xcc) excretes a chemical that reverts stomatal closure that was caused by bacteria and abscisic acid (ABA). Most stomata close in the presence of ABA, but some are unresponsive to bacteria. In Arabidopsis Xcc does not revert bacteria-induced or ABA-induced stomatal closure. Scientists are not certain if MAPK cascades are responsible for the signaling, so further investigation is needed for this.

== Negative regulation ==
The identification of MEKK1-MKK1/2-MPK4 in pathogen signaling has been a tremendous finding. Mekk1, mkk1/mkk2 double and mpk4 mutations are dwarfed and acquire too much of reactive oxygen species. The mutations are considered to be from the enhancement of SA levels, which is partially reversed by bacterial SA hydrolase. Mekk1, mkk1/mkk2 double and mpk4 mutations have cell death occur spontaneously, pathogenesis-related genes and increased resistance to pathogens. MEKK1 appears to have deregulation pathways that are unknown and do not involve MKK1/MKK2 nor MPK4. MEKK1 interact with WRKY53, which is responsible for mekk1 genes set, and alter the activity of WRKY53 that is a short portion of MAPK signaling. Substrates of MPK4 are three proteins: WRKY33, WRKY25, and MKS1. Ternary MKS1-MPK4-WRKY33 complexes have been recognized by nuclear extracts. Recruitment of WRKY33 depends on the phosphorylation of MPK4. Once activated, MPK3 phosphorylates MKS1, which releases WRKY33 from the ternary complex. The free WRKY33 is believed to induce transcription on target genes., allowing for a negative regulation by MPK4. Pathogens have developed mechanisms that inactivate PAMP-induced signaling pathways through the MAPK networks. Andrea Pitzschke and her colleges claim “AvrPto and AvrPtoB interact with the FLS2 receptor and its co-receptor BAK1. AvrPtoB catalyzes the polyubiquitination and subsequent proteasome-dependent degradation of FLS2” (Pitzschke 3). AvrPto interacts with BAK1 and interrupts the binding of FLS2. Pseudomonas syringae have HopAI1, which is a phosphothreonin lyase, and dephosphorylates the threonine residue at the upstream MAPKKs. HopAI1 interacts with MPK3 and MPK6 allowing for flg22 activation to occur. In certain soil-borne pathogens that carry flagellin variants cannot be detected by FLS2, but there is still a triggered innate immune response. The immune response has been shown to be from the EF-Tu protein. Flg22, elf18, FLS2 and EFR have receptors that are in the same subfamily of LRR-RLKs, LRRXII. This means that elf18 and flg22 induce extracellular alkalization, rapid activation of MAPKs, and gene responses that are similar to each other. Although there appears to be an important relationship between MAPKs with EF-Tu-triggered defense, the evidence remains to be unclear. The reason for this unclear relationship is because of Agrobacterium tumefaciens, which infects into segments of plant DNA. EFR1 mutants do not recognize EF-Tu, but there is no research on MAPK activities and efr1. Initiation of defense signaling can be a positive effect to the plant pathogens because activating MPK3 in response to flg22 causes phosphorylation and translocation of virE2 interacting protein 1 (VIP1). VIP1 serves as a shuttle for the pathogenic T-DNA, but the induction of defense genes can occur as well. This allows for the spreading and cessation of the pathogen in the plant, but the pathogen can overcome the problem by attacking VIP1 for proteasome degradation by VirF, which is a virulence factor that encodes an F-box protein.
