= MAPK6 =

Protein-coding gene in the species Homo sapiens

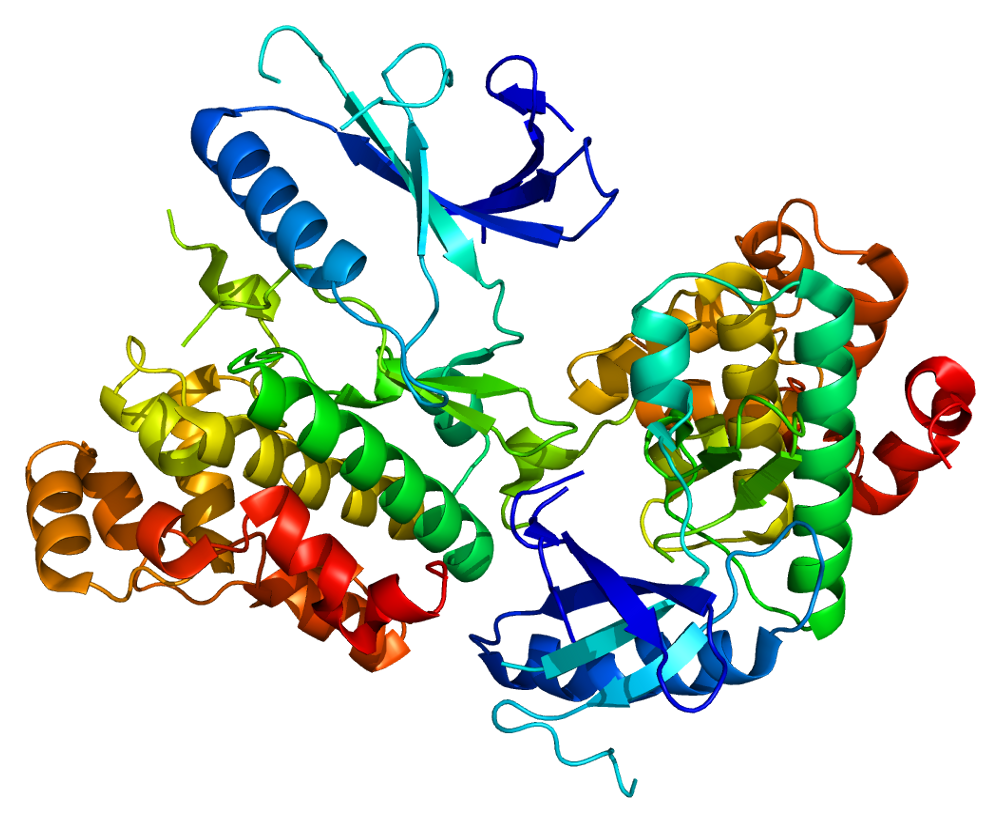

Identifiers
- Aliases: MAPK6, ERK3, HsT17250, PRKM6, p97MAPK, mitogen-activated protein kinase 6
- External IDs: OMIM: 602904; MGI: 1354946; GeneCards: MAPK6
Available structures
PDB	Ortholog search: PDBe RCSB
PDB	List of PDB id codes 2I6L
Enzyme activity
EC #	BRENDA	ExPASy	KEGG	MetaCyc
2.7.11.24	↗	↗	↗	↗

Gene location (Human)
Chr.	Chromosome 15 (human)
Band	15q21.2	Start	51,952,106 bp
Band	15q21.2	End	52,067,375 bp

Gene location (Mouse)
Chr.	Chromosome 9 (mouse)
Band	9 D|9 42.3 cM	Start	75,276,344 bp
Band	9 D|9 42.3 cM	End	75,317,287 bp
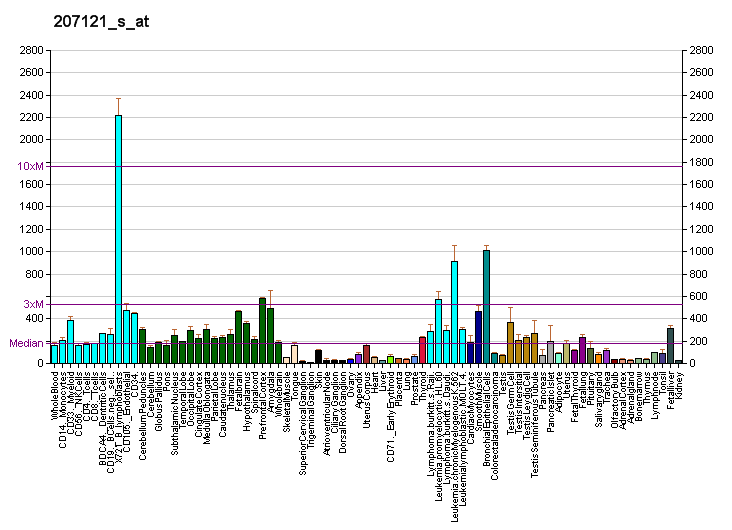
RNA expression pattern
Bgee	Human / Mouse (ortholog); Top expressed in: cartilage tissue; gums; gingival epithelium; mucosa of ileum; hair follicle; cervix epithelium; middle temporal gyrus; pons; skin of thigh; body of tongue / Top expressed in: spermatocyte; spermatid; seminiferous tubule; zygote; ganglionic eminence; somite; molar; mandibular prominence; medial ganglionic eminence; maxillary prominence; More reference expression data
BioGPS	More reference expression data
Gene ontology
Molecular function	kinase activity; transferase activity; nucleotide binding; protein serine/threonine kinase activity; protein kinase activity; protein binding; ATP binding; protein kinase binding; protein heterodimerization activity; MAP kinase activity
Cellular component	nucleoplasm; septin cytoskeleton; cytosol; nucleus; cytoplasm; protein-containing complex
Biological process	protein phosphorylation; cell cycle; phosphorylation; signal transduction; MAPK cascade; positive regulation of dendritic spine development; regulation of gene expression; cellular response to organic substance; intracellular signal transduction
Sources:Amigo / QuickGO
Orthologs
Databases	NCBI: entry; OMA: entry
Species	Human	Mouse
Entrez	5597	50772
Ensembl	ENSG00000069956	ENSMUSG00000042688
UniProt	Q16659	Q61532
RefSeq (mRNA)	NM_002748	NM_015806; NM_027418
RefSeq (protein)	NP_002739	NP_056621; NP_081694
Location (UCSC)	Chr 15: 51.95 – 52.07 Mb	Chr 9: 75.28 – 75.32 Mb
PubMed search
- Wikidata
View/Edit Human	View/Edit Mouse

Mitogen-activated protein kinase 6 is an enzyme that in humans is encoded by the MAPK6 gene.

The protein encoded by this gene is a member of the Ser/Thr protein kinase family, and is most closely related to mitogen-activated protein kinases (MAP kinases). MAP kinases, also known as extracellular signal-regulated kinases (ERKs), are activated through protein phosphorylation cascades and act as integration points for multiple biochemical signals. This kinase is localized in the nucleus, and has been reported to be activated in fibroblasts upon treatment with serum or phorbol esters.

== Discovery ==
ERK3/MAPK6 was initially cloned from the rat brain cDNA library by homology screening with probes ERK1 derived probe.

== Gene location ==
In humans, MAPK 6 gene is located on the distal arm of chromosome 15 (15q21.2). It is 47.01kb long and is transcribed in the centromere to telomere orientation. It consist of 6 exons with the translation initiation codon which is located in exon2.

== Structure ==
It is an atypical member of the mitogen activated kinases family. The molecular mass of the translated protein is approximately 100kDa, and is made up of 721 amino acid residues. It contains a typical kinase domain at the N- terminal and an extended C- terminal. The first 150 residues at c- terminal are 50% similar to ERK4 protein. At the kinase domain it exhibits about 70% similarity with the ERK4 protein. The activation loop of the phosphorylation motif contains only one phospho acceptor site (Ser-Glu-Gly).

The structure is predicted by homology modelling using the crystal structure of phoshphorylated ERK2. According to the model, the structure of ERK3/MAPK6 kinase domain resembles other MAP kinases. The modelled ERK3/MAPK6 kinase domain is predicted to fold with a topology similar to other MAP kinases.

== Expression ==
ERK3/MAPK6 is widely expressed protein however it is expressed in significantly higher amounts in skeletal muscles and brain. It is localized in cytoplasm and the nucleus of cells. ERK3/MAPK6 is a highly unstable protein and has a very little half life of less than an hour. It is degraded by ubiquitin mediated proteasomal pathway.

== Function ==
It is very important for neonatal growth and survival. ERK3/MAPK6 forms a complex with microtubule associated protein2 (MAP2) and MAPKAPK5 which mediates the phosphorylation of MAPKAPK5 which in turn phosphorylates ERK3/MAPK6 at serine 189 residue mediating the entry into cell cycle. It also acts as a regulator for T- cell development. The catalytic activity of ERK3/MAPK6 plays an important for the proper differentiation of T-cells in the thymus. The long c- terminal is responsible for thymic differentiation.

== Role in cancer ==
ERK3/MAPK6 interacts with and phosphorylated steroid receptor coactivator 3 (SRC-3) This coreceptor is an oncogenic protein which when overexpressed at serine 857 leads to cancer. After the phosphorylation of SRC-3 results in the upregulation of MMP activity ERK3-mediated phosphorylation at S857 was essential for interaction of SRC-3 with the ETS transcription factor PEA3, which promotes upregulation of MMP gene expression and proinvasive activity.
