= PTPRR =

Protein-coding gene in the species Homo sapiens

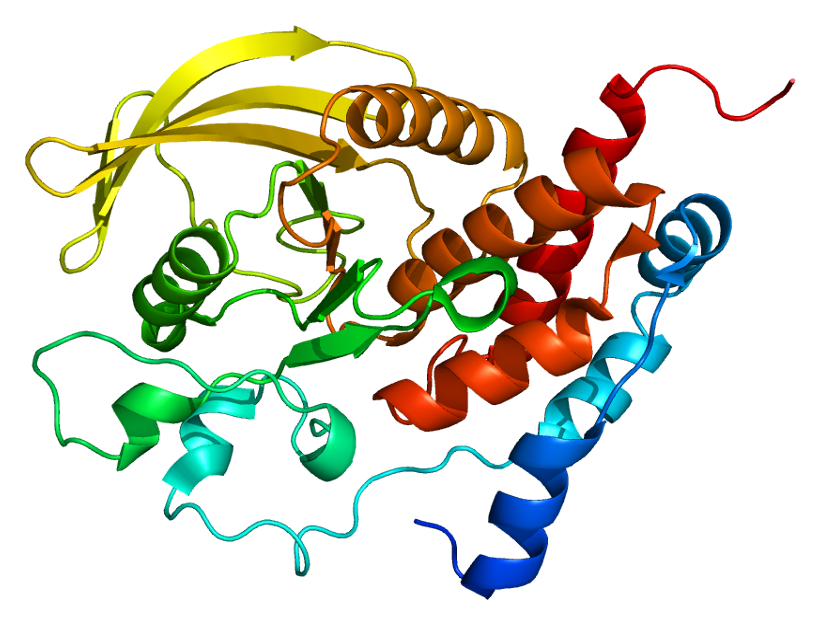

Identifiers
- Aliases: PTPRR, EC-PTP, PCPTP1, PTP-SL, PTPBR7, PTPRQ, protein tyrosine phosphatase, receptor type R, protein tyrosine phosphatase receptor type R
- External IDs: OMIM: 602853; MGI: 109559; GeneCards: PTPRR
Available structures
PDB	Ortholog search: PDBe RCSB
PDB	List of PDB id codes 2A8B
Enzyme activity
EC #	BRENDA	ExPASy	KEGG	MetaCyc
3.1.3.48	↗	↗	↗	↗

Gene location (Human)
Chr.	Chromosome 12 (human)
Band	12q15	Start	70,638,073 bp
Band	12q15	End	70,920,738 bp

Gene location (Mouse)
Chr.	Chromosome 10 (mouse)
Band	10|10 D2	Start	115,854,118 bp
Band	10|10 D2	End	116,110,837 bp
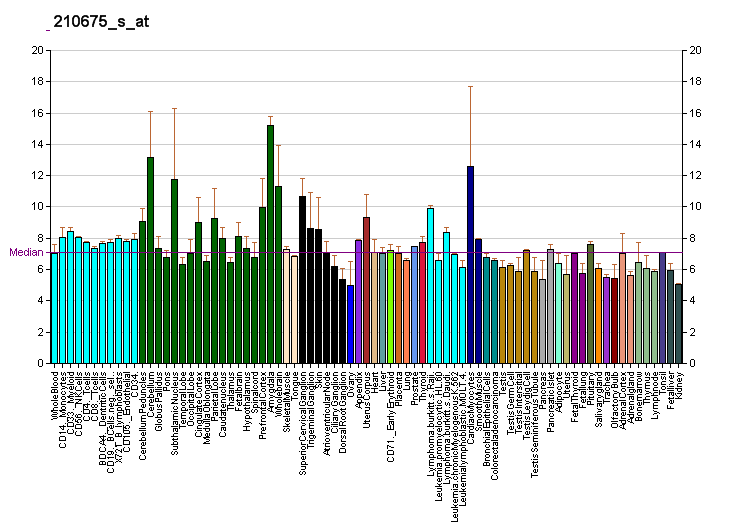

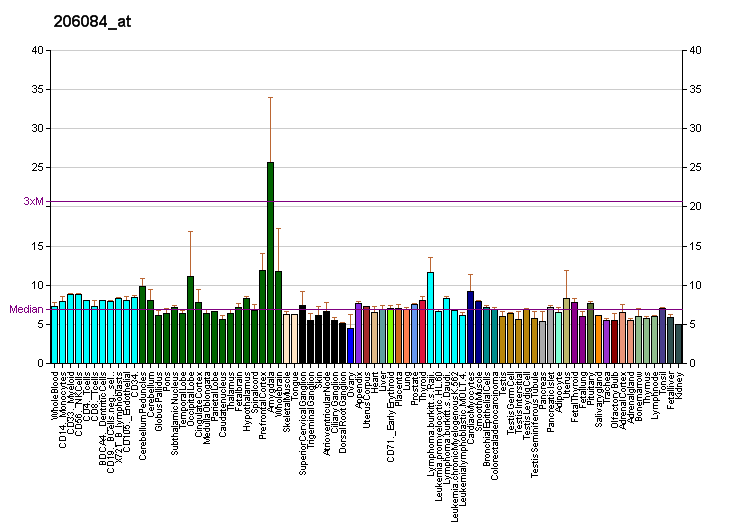
RNA expression pattern
Bgee	Human / Mouse (ortholog); Top expressed in: endothelial cell; right hemisphere of cerebellum; prefrontal cortex; entorhinal cortex; jejunal mucosa; mucosa of transverse colon; Brodmann area 46; testicle; orbitofrontal cortex; cerebellar vermis / Top expressed in: Ileal epithelium; zygote; secondary oocyte; entorhinal cortex; perirhinal cortex; lobe of cerebellum; CA3 field; jejunum; transitional epithelium of urinary bladder; lumbar spinal ganglion; More reference expression data
BioGPS	More reference expression data
Gene ontology
Molecular function	phosphoprotein phosphatase activity; phosphatase activity; protein binding; protein tyrosine phosphatase activity; transmembrane receptor protein tyrosine phosphatase activity; protein kinase binding; hydrolase activity
Cellular component	integral component of membrane; membrane; plasma membrane; cell junction; perinuclear region of cytoplasm; extracellular space; cytoplasm; cytosol
Biological process	protein dephosphorylation; in utero embryonic development; ERBB2 signaling pathway; regulation of homophilic cell adhesion; negative regulation of ERK1 and ERK2 cascade; peptidyl-tyrosine dephosphorylation; negative regulation of epithelial cell migration; dephosphorylation
Sources:Amigo / QuickGO
Orthologs
Databases	NCBI: entry; OMA: entry
Species	Human	Mouse
Entrez	5801	19279
Ensembl	ENSG00000153233	ENSMUSG00000020151
UniProt	Q15256	Q62132
RefSeq (mRNA)	NM_001207015; NM_001207016; NM_002849; NM_130846	NM_001161837; NM_001161838; NM_001161839; NM_001161840; NM_011217 NM_001358484
RefSeq (protein)	NP_001193944; NP_001193945; NP_002840; NP_570897	NP_001155309; NP_001155310; NP_001155311; NP_001155312; NP_035347 NP_001345413
Location (UCSC)	Chr 12: 70.64 – 70.92 Mb	Chr 10: 115.85 – 116.11 Mb
PubMed search
- Wikidata
View/Edit Human	View/Edit Mouse

Protein tyrosine phosphatase receptor-type R is an enzyme that in humans is encoded by the PTPRR gene.

== Function ==
The protein encoded by this gene is a member of the protein tyrosine phosphatase (PTP) family. PTPs are known to be signaling molecules that regulate a variety of cellular processes including cell growth, differentiation, mitotic cycle, and oncogenic transformation. This PTP possesses an extracellular region, a single transmembrane region, and a single intracellular catalytic domains, and thus represents a receptor-type PTP. The similar gene predominantly expressed in mouse brain was found to associate with, and thus regulate the activity and cellular localization of MAP kinases. The rat counterpart of this gene was reported to be regulated by the nerve growth factor, which suggested the function of this gene in neuronal growth and differentiation.

== Interactions ==
PTPRR has been shown to interact with MAPK7.
