= GADD45A =

Protein-coding gene in humans

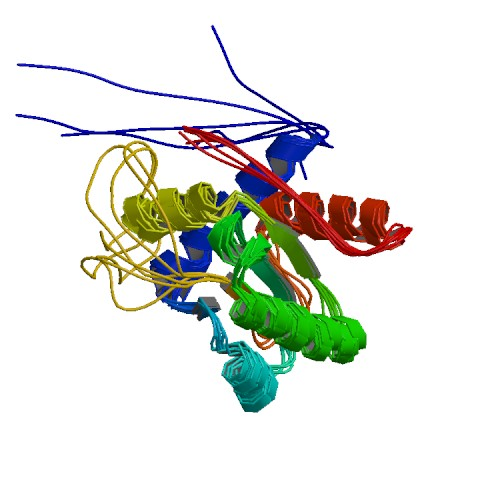

Identifiers
- Aliases: GADD45A, DDIT1, GADD45, growth arrest and DNA damage inducible alpha
- External IDs: OMIM: 126335; MGI: 107799; GeneCards: GADD45A
Available structures
PDB	Ortholog search: PDBe RCSB
PDB	List of PDB id codes 2KG4

Gene location (Human)
Chr.	Chromosome 1 (human)
Band	1p31.3	Start	67,685,201 bp
Band	1p31.3	End	67,688,334 bp

Gene location (Mouse)
Chr.	Chromosome 6 (mouse)
Band	6|6 C1	Start	67,012,080 bp
Band	6|6 C1	End	67,014,441 bp
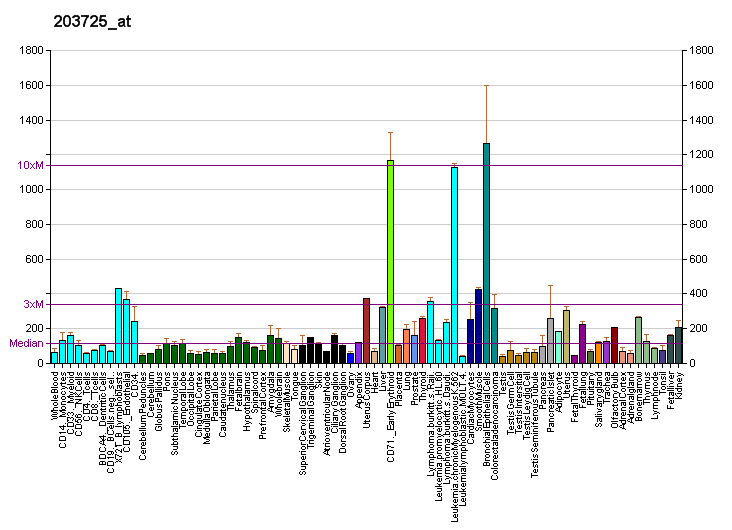
RNA expression pattern
Bgee	Human / Mouse (ortholog); Top expressed in: Descending thoracic aorta; vena cava; ascending aorta; popliteal artery; tibial arteries; glomerulus; metanephric glomerulus; human kidney; cartilage tissue; left coronary artery / Top expressed in: granulocyte; muscle of thigh; blood; extensor digitorum longus muscle; fetal liver hematopoietic progenitor cell; transitional epithelium of urinary bladder; renal corpuscle; interventricular septum; duodenum; jejunum; More reference expression data
BioGPS	More reference expression data
Gene ontology
Molecular function	protein binding; kinase binding; protein homodimerization activity; protein heterodimerization activity; protein N-terminus binding; RNA polymerase II core promoter sequence-specific DNA binding
Cellular component	cytoplasm; nucleus; nucleoplasm; nuclear speck
Biological process	apoptotic process; centrosome cycle; regulation of cyclin-dependent protein serine/threonine kinase activity; negative regulation of protein kinase activity; signal transduction in response to DNA damage; response to stress; positive regulation of JNK cascade; regulation of cell cycle; cellular response to DNA damage stimulus; cellular response to mechanical stimulus; positive regulation of reactive oxygen species metabolic process; positive regulation of apoptotic process; cellular response to ionizing radiation; cell cycle; DNA repair; positive regulation of p38MAPK cascade; DNA damage response, signal transduction by p53 class mediator resulting in cell cycle arrest
Sources:Amigo / QuickGO
Orthologs
Databases	NCBI: entry; OMA: entry
Species	Human	Mouse
Entrez	1647	13197
Ensembl	ENSG00000116717	ENSMUSG00000036390
UniProt	P24522	P48316
RefSeq (mRNA)	NM_001924; NM_001199741; NM_001199742	NM_007836
RefSeq (protein)	NP_001186670; NP_001186671; NP_001915	NP_031862
Location (UCSC)	Chr 1: 67.69 – 67.69 Mb	Chr 6: 67.01 – 67.01 Mb
PubMed search
- Wikidata
View/Edit Human	View/Edit Mouse

Growth arrest and DNA-damage-inducible protein GADD45 alpha is a protein that in humans is encoded by the GADD45A gene.

== Function ==
This gene is a member of a group of genes, the GADD45 genes, whose transcript levels are increased following stressful growth arrest conditions and treatment with DNA-damaging agents (mutagens). The DNA damage-induced transcription of this gene is mediated by both p53-dependent and -independent mechanisms. The protein encoded by this gene responds to environmental stresses by mediating activation of the p38/JNK pathway via MTK1/MEKK4 kinase.

== Applications ==
The fact that expression of this gene is an indicator of DNA damage has been exploited to construct an in vitro test for mutagenicity, the GADD45a-GFP GreenScreen HC assay. This assay consists of a cell line which has been engineered so that expression of GADD45A will lead to expression of green fluorescent protein, which can easily be detected. To test a substance for mutagenicity, it is applied to these cells and fluorescence is measured.

== Interactions ==
GADD45A has been shown to interact with:

- AURKA,
- Cdk1,
- CCNB1,
- GADD45GIP1
- MAP3K4,
- P21, and
- PCNA.

== See also ==
- Gadd45
