= MAP3K3 =

Protein-coding gene in the species Homo sapiens

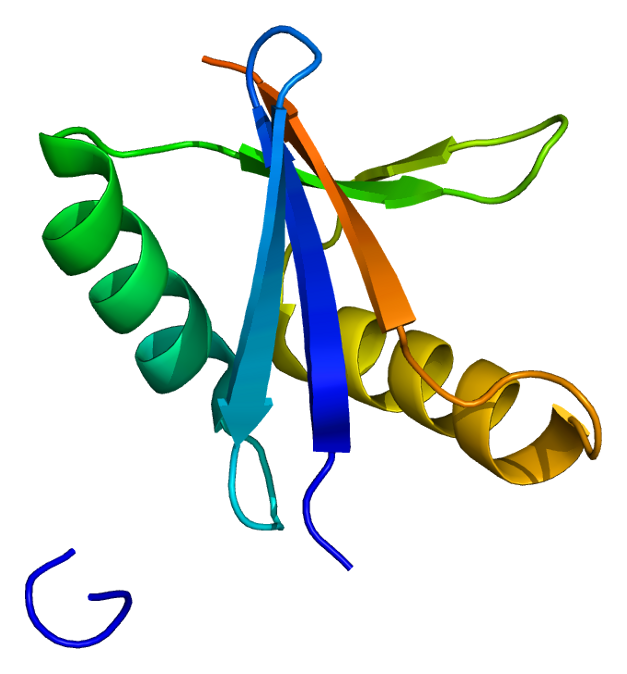

Identifiers
- Aliases: MAP3K3, MAPKKK3, MEKK3, mitogen-activated protein kinase kinase kinase 3
- External IDs: OMIM: 602539; MGI: 1346874; GeneCards: MAP3K3
Available structures
PDB	Ortholog search: PDBe RCSB
PDB	List of PDB id codes 2C60, 2JRH, 2PPH, 4Y5O, 4YL6, 2O2V
Enzyme activity
EC #	BRENDA	ExPASy	KEGG	MetaCyc
2.7.11.25	↗	↗	↗	↗

Gene location (Human)
Chr.	Chromosome 17 (human)
Band	17q23.3	Start	63,622,415 bp
Band	17q23.3	End	63,696,305 bp

Gene location (Mouse)
Chr.	Chromosome 11 (mouse)
Band	11|11 E1	Start	105,975,439 bp
Band	11|11 E1	End	106,046,272 bp
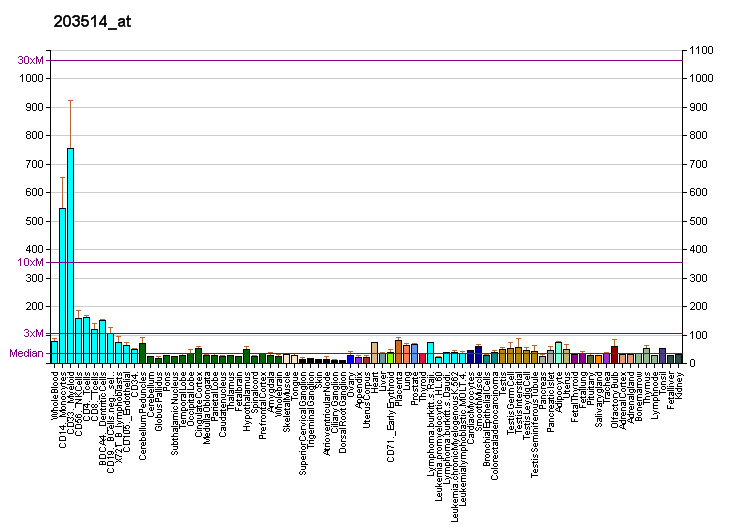
RNA expression pattern
Bgee	Human / Mouse (ortholog); Top expressed in: monocyte; granulocyte; blood; gastric mucosa; apex of heart; right lung; right coronary artery; popliteal artery; tibial arteries; spleen / Top expressed in: granulocyte; internal carotid artery; ascending aorta; aortic valve; external carotid artery; fossa; Rostral migratory stream; condyle; tunica media of zone of aorta; blood; More reference expression data
BioGPS	More reference expression data
Gene ontology
Molecular function	ATP binding; protein kinase activity; protein binding; MAP kinase kinase kinase activity; kinase activity; metal ion binding; nucleotide binding; transferase activity; protein serine/threonine kinase activity
Cellular component	cytosol; cytoplasm
Biological process	intracellular signal transduction; protein phosphorylation; positive regulation of p38MAPK cascade; protein autophosphorylation; blood vessel development; phosphorylation; positive regulation of I-kappaB kinase/NF-kappaB signaling; regulation of mitotic cell cycle; stress-activated protein kinase signaling cascade; activation of protein kinase activity; regulation of apoptotic process; MAPK cascade; interleukin-1-mediated signaling pathway; positive regulation of cell proliferation in bone marrow; positive regulation of cell migration involved in sprouting angiogenesis; negative regulation of cellular senescence; signal transduction
Sources:Amigo / QuickGO
Orthologs
Databases	NCBI: entry; OMA: entry
Species	Human	Mouse
Entrez	4215	26406
Ensembl	ENSG00000198909	ENSMUSG00000020700
UniProt	Q99759	Q61084
RefSeq (mRNA)	NM_002401; NM_203351; NM_001330431; NM_001363768	NM_011947
RefSeq (protein)	NP_001317360; NP_002392; NP_976226; NP_001350697	NP_036077
Location (UCSC)	Chr 17: 63.62 – 63.7 Mb	Chr 11: 105.98 – 106.05 Mb
PubMed search
- Wikidata
View/Edit Human	View/Edit Mouse

Mitogen-activated protein kinase kinase kinase 3 is an enzyme that in humans is encoded by the MAP3K3 gene, which is located on the long arm of chromosome 17 (17q23.3).

== Function ==
This gene product is a 626-amino acid polypeptide that is 96.5% identical to mouse MEKK3. Its catalytic domain is closely related to those of several other kinases, including mouse MEKK2, tobacco NPK, and yeast STE11. Northern blot analysis revealed a 4.6-kb transcript that appears to be ubiquitously expressed.

MAP3Ks are involved in regulating cell fate in response to external stimuli. MAP3K3 directly regulates the stress-activated protein kinase (SAPK) and extracellular signal-regulated protein kinase (ERK) pathways by activating SEK and MEK1/2 respectively. In cotransfection assays, it enhanced transcription from a nuclear factor kappa-B (NF-κB)-dependent reporter gene, consistent with a role in the SAPK pathway. Alternatively spliced transcript variants encoding distinct isoforms have been observed. MEKK3 regulates the p38, JNK and ERK1/2 pathways.

== Interactions ==
MAP3K3 has been shown to interact with [SQSTM1/p62],:

- BRCA1, AKT.
- GAB1,
- MAP2K5, and
- YWHAE.

== MAP3K3 in cancer ==
Two SNPs in the MAP3K3 gene were found as candidates for association with colon and rectal cancers.

MEKK3 is highly expressed in 4 ovarian cancer cell lines (OVCA429, Hey, DOV13, and SKOv3). This expression level is significantly higher in those cancer cells when compared to normal cells. MEKK3 expression levels are comparable to IKK kinase activities, which also relate to activation of NFκB. High expression of MEKK3 in most of these ovarian cancer cells supposedly activate IKK kinase activity, which lead to increased levels of active NFκB. Also, MEKK3 interacts with AKT to activate NFκB. Genes related to cell survival and anti-apoptosis have increased expression in most cancer cells with high levels of MEKK3. This is probably due to constitutive activation of NFκB, which will regulate those genes. In this sense, knockdown of MEKK3 caused ovarian cancer cells to be more sensitive to drugs.

MEKK3 also interacts with BRCA1. Knocking down BRCA1 resulted in inhibited MEKK3 kinase activity. The drug paclitaxel induces MEKK3 activity and it requires functional BRCA1 to do it. It was observed that in a breast cancer cell line BRCA1-deficient (HCC1937), paclitaxel was unable to activate MEKK3. Paclitaxel may be inducing stress-response through the MEKK3/JNK/p38/MAPK pathway, but not in mutated BRCA1 cells.
