= MAP3K4 =

Protein-coding gene in the species Homo sapiens

Identifiers
- Aliases: MAP3K4, MAPKKK4, MEKK 4, MEKK4, MTK1, PRO0412, mitogen-activated protein kinase kinase kinase 4
- External IDs: OMIM: 602425; MGI: 1346875; GeneCards: MAP3K4
Enzyme activity
EC #	BRENDA	ExPASy	KEGG	MetaCyc
2.7.11.25	↗	↗	↗	↗

Gene location (Human)
Chr.	Chromosome 6 (human)
Band	6q26	Start	160,991,727 bp
Band	6q26	End	161,117,385 bp

Gene location (Mouse)
Chr.	Chromosome 17 (mouse)
Band	17 8.42 cM|17 A1	Start	12,446,508 bp
Band	17 8.42 cM|17 A1	End	12,537,683 bp
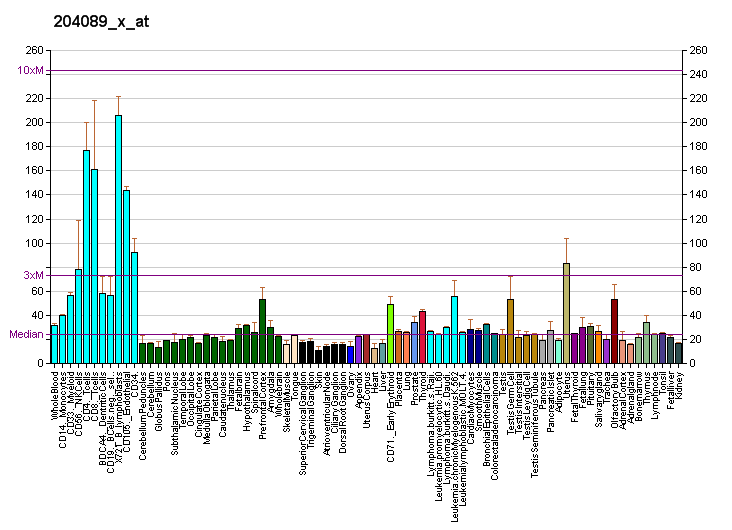

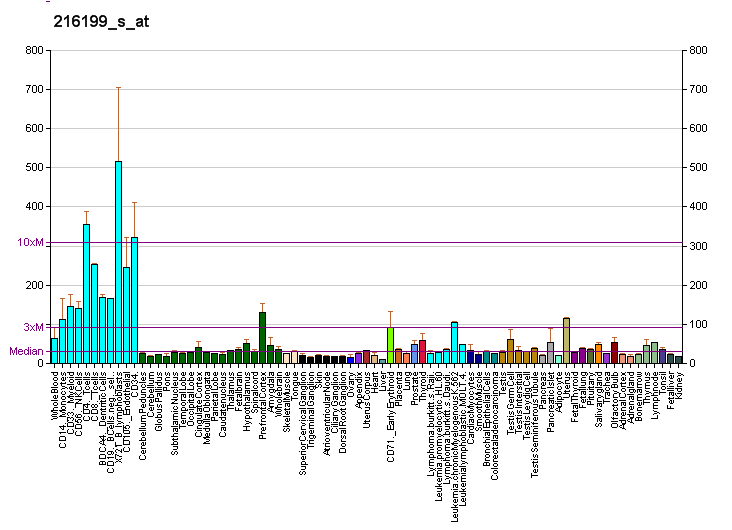
RNA expression pattern
Bgee	Human / Mouse (ortholog); Top expressed in: middle temporal gyrus; secondary oocyte; Brodmann area 23; sural nerve; Achilles tendon; gingival epithelium; oral cavity; right hemisphere of cerebellum; pancreatic ductal cell; right uterine tube / Top expressed in: fossa; Rostral migratory stream; condyle; epithelium of lens; substantia nigra; medullary collecting duct; facial motor nucleus; vestibular membrane of cochlear duct; Paneth cell; primary oocyte; More reference expression data
BioGPS	More reference expression data
Gene ontology
Molecular function	protein serine/threonine kinase activity; ATP binding; protein kinase activity; protein binding; MAP kinase kinase kinase activity; kinase activity; metal ion binding; nucleotide binding; transferase activity
Cellular component	perinuclear region of cytoplasm; cytoplasm
Biological process	positive regulation of JUN kinase activity; intracellular signal transduction; protein phosphorylation; placenta development; positive regulation of telomerase activity; positive regulation of p38MAPK cascade; positive regulation of telomere maintenance via telomerase; regulation of gene expression; positive regulation of telomere capping; response to UV-C; phosphorylation; male germ-line sex determination; chorionic trophoblast cell differentiation; MAPK cascade; regulation of mitotic cell cycle; regulation of apoptotic process; signal transduction; stress-activated protein kinase signaling cascade; activation of protein kinase activity
Sources:Amigo / QuickGO
Orthologs
Databases	NCBI: entry; OMA: entry
Species	Human	Mouse
Entrez	4216	26407
Ensembl	ENSG00000085511	ENSMUSG00000014426
UniProt	Q9Y6R4	O08648
RefSeq (mRNA)	NM_001291958; NM_001301072; NM_005922; NM_006724; NM_001363582	NM_011948; NM_001357722
RefSeq (protein)	NP_001278887; NP_001288001; NP_005913; NP_006715; NP_001350511	NP_036078; NP_001344651
Location (UCSC)	Chr 6: 160.99 – 161.12 Mb	Chr 17: 12.45 – 12.54 Mb
PubMed search
- Wikidata
View/Edit Human	View/Edit Mouse

Mitogen-activated protein kinase kinase kinase 4 is an enzyme that in humans is encoded by the MAP3K4 gene.

The central core of each mitogen-activated protein kinase (MAPK) pathway is a conserved cascade of 3 protein kinases: an activated MAPK kinase kinase (MAPKKK) phosphorylates and activates a specific MAPK kinase (MAPKK), which then activates a specific MAPK. While the ERK MAPKs are activated by mitogenic stimulation, the CSBP2 (p38α) and JNK MAPKs are activated by environmental stresses such as osmotic shock, UV irradiation, wound stress, and inflammatory factors. This gene encodes a MAPKKK, the MEKK4 protein, also called MTK1. This protein contains a protein kinase catalytic domain at the C terminus. The N-terminal nonkinase domain may contain a regulatory domain. Expression of MEKK4 in mammalian cells activated the CSBP2 (p38α) and JNK MAPK pathways, but not the ERK pathway. In vitro kinase studies indicated that recombinant MEKK4 can specifically phosphorylate and activate PRKMK6 (MKK6) and SERK1 (MKK4), MAPKKs that activate CSBP2 (p38α) and JNK, respectively but cannot phosphorylate PRKMK1 (MKK1), an MAPKK that activates ERKs. MEKK4 is a major mediator of environmental stresses that activate the p38 MAPK pathway, and a minor mediator of the JNK pathway. Two alternatively spliced transcripts encoding distinct isoforms have been described.

== Interactions ==
MAP3K4 has been shown to interact with GADD45G, GADD45B and GADD45A.
