= MAP2K5 =

Protein-coding gene in the species Homo sapiens

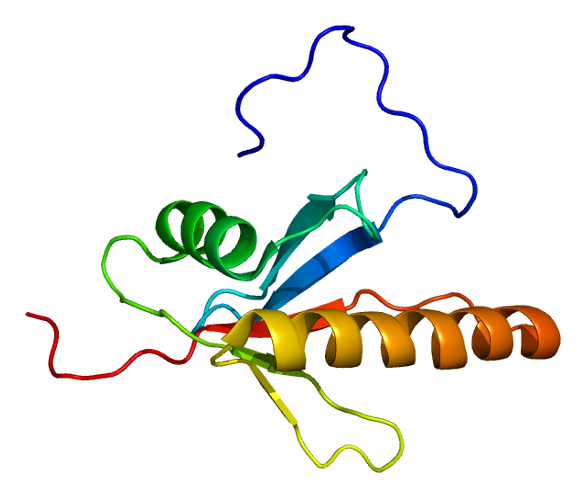

Identifiers
- Aliases: MAP2K5, HsT17454, MAPKK5, MEK5, PRKMK5, mitogen-activated protein kinase kinase 5
- External IDs: OMIM: 602520; MGI: 1346345; GeneCards: MAP2K5
Available structures
PDB	Ortholog search: PDBe RCSB
PDB	List of PDB id codes 2NPT, 2O2V, 4IC7
Enzyme activity
EC #	BRENDA	ExPASy	KEGG	MetaCyc
2.7.12.2	↗	↗	↗	↗

Gene location (Human)
Chr.	Chromosome 15 (human)
Band	15q23	Start	67,542,703 bp
Band	15q23	End	67,807,117 bp

Gene location (Mouse)
Chr.	Chromosome 9 (mouse)
Band	9|9 B- C	Start	63,071,050 bp
Band	9|9 B- C	End	63,285,184 bp
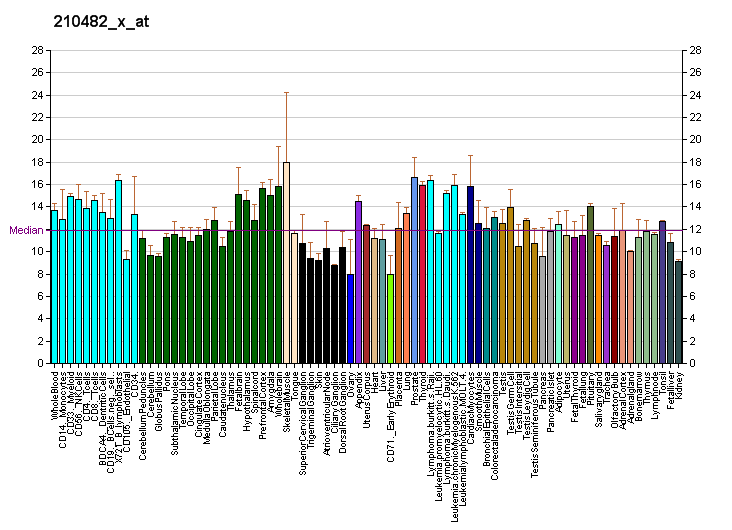

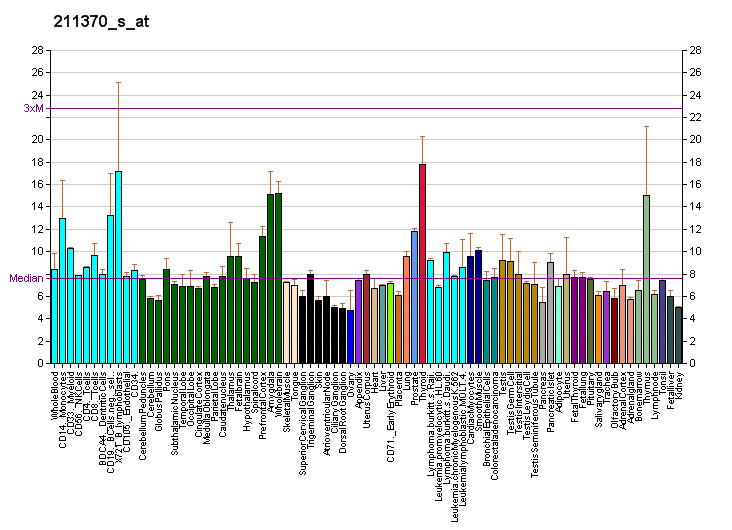

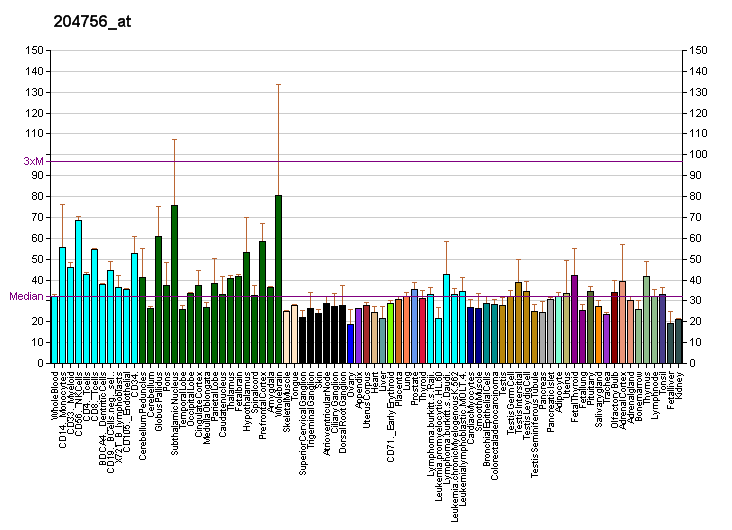
RNA expression pattern
Bgee	Human / Mouse (ortholog); Top expressed in: right testis; left testis; parotid gland; gonad; right frontal lobe; Achilles tendon; gastrocnemius muscle; ventricular zone; Brodmann area 9; prefrontal cortex / Top expressed in: internal carotid artery; external carotid artery; motor neuron; Rostral migratory stream; spermatocyte; CA3 field; right kidney; seminiferous tubule; primitive streak; left lobe of liver; More reference expression data
BioGPS	More reference expression data
Gene ontology
Molecular function	transferase activity; protein kinase activity; nucleotide binding; metal ion binding; kinase activity; protein binding; protein tyrosine kinase activity; ATP binding; protein serine/threonine kinase activity; MAP kinase kinase activity
Cellular component	cytoplasm; cytosol; spindle; nucleus; intracellular anatomical structure
Biological process	negative regulation of chemokine (C-X-C motif) ligand 2 production; negative regulation of cysteine-type endopeptidase activity involved in apoptotic process; phosphorylation; positive regulation of epithelial cell proliferation; cellular response to laminar fluid shear stress; cellular response to growth factor stimulus; negative regulation of transcription by RNA polymerase II; negative regulation of response to cytokine stimulus; MAPK cascade; ERK5 cascade; negative regulation of cell migration involved in sprouting angiogenesis; protein phosphorylation; development of the heart; positive regulation of cell growth; peptidyl-tyrosine phosphorylation; negative regulation of heterotypic cell-cell adhesion; negative regulation of extrinsic apoptotic signaling pathway in absence of ligand; negative regulation of NF-kappaB transcription factor activity; signal transduction; positive regulation of transcription by RNA polymerase II; regulation of mitotic cell cycle; stress-activated protein kinase signaling cascade; activation of protein kinase activity; regulation of apoptotic process
Sources:Amigo / QuickGO
Orthologs
Databases	NCBI: entry; OMA: entry
Species	Human	Mouse
Entrez	5607	23938
Ensembl	ENSG00000137764	ENSMUSG00000058444
UniProt	Q13163	Q9WVS7
RefSeq (mRNA)	NM_001206804; NM_002757; NM_145160; NM_145161; NM_145162	NM_011840; NM_001364492; NM_001364493; NM_001364494
RefSeq (protein)	NP_001193733; NP_002748; NP_660143	NP_035970; NP_001351421; NP_001351422; NP_001351423
Location (UCSC)	Chr 15: 67.54 – 67.81 Mb	Chr 9: 63.07 – 63.29 Mb
PubMed search
- Wikidata
View/Edit Human	View/Edit Mouse

Dual specificity mitogen-activated protein kinase kinase 5 is an enzyme that in humans is encoded by the MAP2K5 gene.

== Function ==
The protein encoded by this gene is a dual specificity protein kinase that belongs to the MAP kinase kinase family. This kinase specifically interacts with and activates MAPK7/ERK5. This kinase itself can be phosphorylated and activated by MAP3K3/MEKK3, as well as by atypical protein kinase C isoforms (aPKCs). The signal cascade mediated by this kinase is involved in growth factor stimulated cell proliferation and muscle cell differentiation. Four alternatively spliced transcript variants of this gene encoding distinct isoforms have been described.

== Upstream ==
This kinase itself can be phosphorylated and activated by MAP3K3/MEKK3, as well as by atypical protein kinase C isoforms (aPKCs).

== Downstream ==
This kinase specifically interacts with and activates MAPK7/ERK5.

== Interactions ==
MAP2K5 has been shown to interact with MAPK7, MAP3K2, Protein kinase Mζ and MAP3K3.
