= Gadd45 =

The Growth Arrest and DNA Damage or gadd45 genes, including GADD45A (originally termed gadd45) GADD45B (originally termed MyD118), and GADD45G (originally termed CR6), are implicated as stress sensors that modulate the response of mammalian cells to genotoxic/physiological stress, and modulate tumor formation. Gadd45 proteins interact with other proteins implicated in stress responses, including PCNA, p21, Cdc2/CyclinB1, MEKK4, and p38 kinase.

GADD45 proteins regulate differentiation at the two cell stage of embryogenesis, a key stage of zygotic genome activation. GADD45 likely acts by promoting TET-mediated DNA demethylation leading to the induction of expression of genes necessary for zygote activation.

Overexpression of the GADD45 gene in the Drosophila melanogaster nervous system significantly increases longevity. This longevity increase can be attributed to more efficient recognition and repair of spontaneous DNA damages generated by physiological processes and environmental factors.

== History ==
- Gadd45a was discovered and characterized in the laboratory of Dr. Albert J. Fornace Jr. in 1988.
- Gadd45b (MyD118) was discovered and characterized in the laboratories of Drs. Dan A. Liebermann and Barbara Hoffman in 1991.
- Gadd45g (CR6) was discovered and characterized in the laboratories of Drs. Kenneth Smith, Dan A. Liebermann, and Barbara Hoffman in 1993 and 1999.

== See also ==
- GADD45A
- GADD45B
- GADD45G
