= C-Raf =

Mammalian protein found in Homo sapiens

RAF1
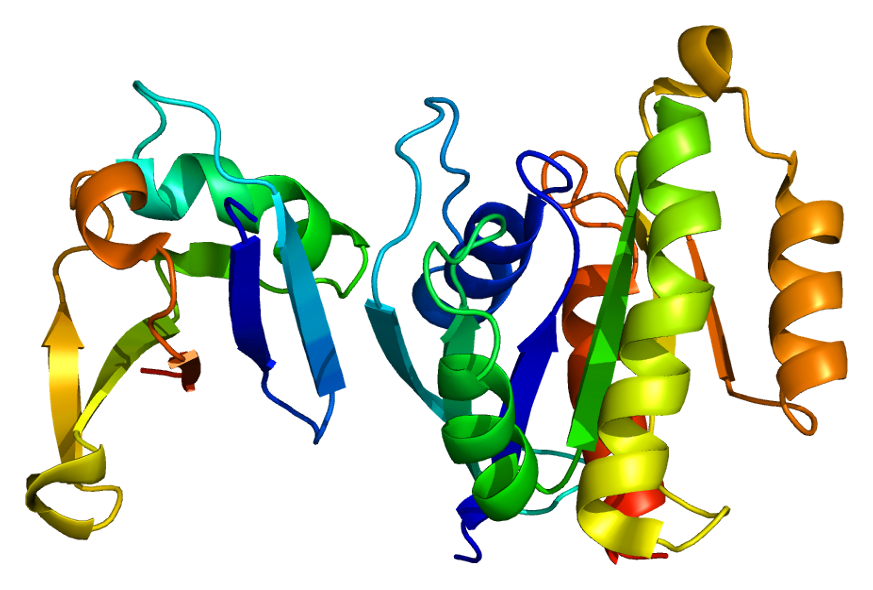

Identifiers
- Aliases: RAF1, Raf-1 proto-oncogene, serine/threonine kinase, CMD1NN, CRAF, NS5, Raf-1, c-Raf
- External IDs: OMIM: 164760; MGI: 97847; GeneCards: RAF1
Available structures
PDB	Ortholog search: PDBe RCSB
PDB	List of PDB id codes 1C1Y, 1FAQ, 1FAR, 1GUA, 1RFA, 3CU8, 3IQJ, 3IQU, 3IQV, 3KUC, 3KUD, 3NKX, 3O8I, 3OMV, 4FJ3, 4G0N, 4G3X, 4IEA, 4IHL
Enzyme activity
EC #	BRENDA	ExPASy	KEGG	MetaCyc
2.7.11.1	↗	↗	↗	↗

Gene location (Mouse)
Chr.	Chromosome 6 (mouse)
Band	6 E3|6 53.62 cM	Start	115,595,028 bp
Band	6 E3|6 53.62 cM	End	115,653,596 bp
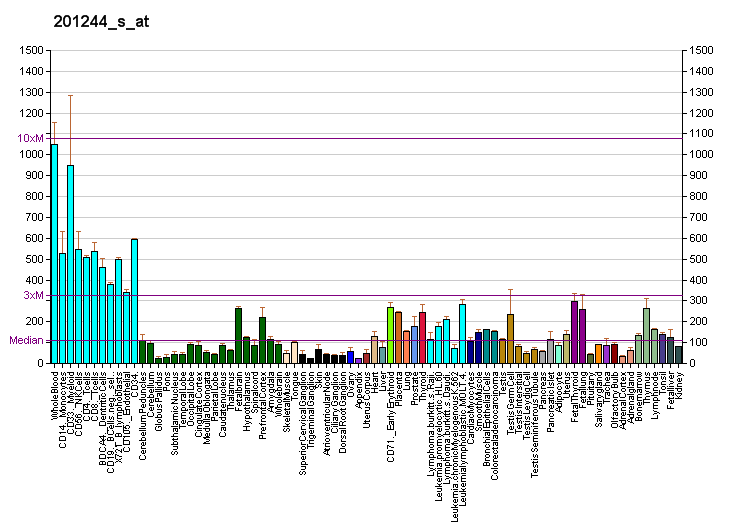
RNA expression pattern
Bgee	Human / Mouse (ortholog); n/a / Top expressed in: granulocyte; epithelium of stomach; zygote; medullary collecting duct; ventricular zone; secondary oocyte; ganglionic eminence; temporal muscle; triceps brachii muscle; muscle of thigh
BioGPS	More reference expression data
Gene ontology
Molecular function	transferase activity; protein kinase activity; nucleotide binding; metal ion binding; protein serine/threonine kinase activity; small GTPase binding; protein binding; identical protein binding; ATP binding; kinase activity; MAP kinase kinase kinase activity; enzyme binding; mitogen-activated protein kinase kinase binding; adenylate cyclase binding; adenylate cyclase activator activity; protein heterodimerization activity
Cellular component	cytoplasm; cytosol; Golgi apparatus; pseudopodium; membrane; plasma membrane; mitochondrial outer membrane; mitochondrion; nucleus; nuclear speck; intracellular anatomical structure
Biological process	response to muscle stretch; regulation of apoptotic process; cell differentiation; negative regulation of cysteine-type endopeptidase activity involved in apoptotic process; positive regulation of protein phosphorylation; intracellular signal transduction; response to hypoxia; somatic stem cell population maintenance; phosphorylation; thymus development; cellular glucose homeostasis; negative regulation of protein-containing complex assembly; wound healing; stimulatory C-type lectin receptor signaling pathway; negative regulation of apoptotic process; MAPK cascade; positive regulation of peptidyl-serine phosphorylation; regulation of cell motility; platelet activation; protein phosphorylation; development of the heart; thyroid gland development; ion transmembrane transport; face development; death-inducing signaling complex assembly; negative regulation of extrinsic apoptotic signaling pathway via death domain receptors; intermediate filament cytoskeleton organization; regulation of cell differentiation; cell population proliferation; regulation of Rho protein signal transduction; signal transduction; negative regulation of cell population proliferation; positive regulation of transcription by RNA polymerase II; insulin secretion involved in cellular response to glucose stimulus; apoptotic process; neurotrophin TRK receptor signaling pathway; multicellular organism development; negative regulation of signal transduction; positive regulation of ERK1 and ERK2 cascade; activation of adenylate cyclase activity
Sources:Amigo / QuickGO
Orthologs
Databases	NCBI: entry; OMA: entry
Species	Human	Mouse
Entrez	5894	110157
Ensembl	ENSG00000132155	ENSMUSG00000000441
UniProt	P04049	Q99N57
RefSeq (mRNA)	NM_002880	NM_029780; NM_001356333; NM_001356334
RefSeq (protein)	NP_002871; NP_001341618; NP_001341619; NP_001341620; NP_001341621 NP_001341622; NP_001341624; NP_001341623	NP_084056; NP_001343262; NP_001343263
Location (UCSC)	n/a	Chr 6: 115.6 – 115.65 Mb
PubMed search
- Wikidata
View/Edit Human	View/Edit Mouse

RAF proto-oncogene serine/threonine-protein kinase, also known as proto-oncogene c-RAF or simply c-Raf or even Raf-1, is an enzyme that in humans is encoded by the RAF1 gene. The c-Raf protein is part of the ERK1/2 pathway as a MAP kinase (MAP3K) that functions downstream of the Ras subfamily of membrane associated GTPases. C-Raf is a member of the Raf kinase family of serine/threonine-specific protein kinases, from the TKL (Tyrosine-kinase-like) group of kinases.

== Discovery ==
The first Raf gene, v-Raf was found in 1983. It was isolated from the murine retrovirus bearing the number 3611. It was soon demonstrated to be capable to transform rodent fibroblasts to cancerous cell lines, so this gene was given the name Virus-induced Rapidly Accelerated Fibrosarcoma (V-RAF). A year later, another transforming gene was found in the avian retrovirus MH2, named v-Mil - that turned out to be highly similar to v-Raf. Researchers were able to demonstrate that these genes encode enzymes that have serine-threonine kinase activity. Normal cellular homologs of v-Raf and v-Mil were soon found in both the mouse and chicken genome (hence the name c-Raf for the normal cellular Raf gene), and it became clear that these too had a role in regulating growth and cell division.

c-Raf is a principal component of the mitogen-activated protein kinase (MAPK) pathway: ERK1/2 signaling. It acts as a MAP3 kinase, initiating the entire kinase cascade. Subsequent experiments showed that the normal, cellular Raf genes can also mutate to become oncogenes, by "overdriving" MEK1/2 and ERK1/2 activity. In fact, vertebrate genomes contain multiple Raf genes. Several years later after the discovery of c-Raf, two further related kinases were described: A-Raf and B-Raf. The latter became the focus of research in recent years, since a large portion of human tumors carry oncogenic 'driver' mutations in the B-Raf gene. These mutations induce an uncontrolled, high activity of Raf enzymes. Thus diagnostic and therapeutic interest in Raf kinases reached a new peak in the recent years.

== Structure ==
The human c-Raf gene is located on chromosome 3. At least two isoforms of mRNA have been described (arising from inclusion or removal of an alternative exon) that display only minute differences. The shorter, major isoform - consisting of 17 exons - encodes a protein kinase of 648 amino acids.

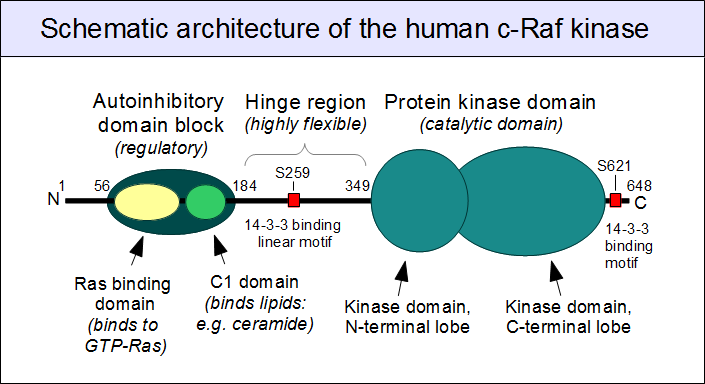
A schematic architecture of human c-Raf protein

Similarly to many other MAPKKKs, c-Raf is a multidomain protein, with several additional domains to aid the regulation of its catalytic activity. On its N-terminal segment, a Ras-binding domain (RBD) and a C-kinase homologous domain 1 (C1 domain) are found next to each other. Structures of both conserved domains were solved in the past decades, shedding light on the mechanisms of their regulation.

The Ras-binding domain displays a ubiquitin-like fold (like many other small G-protein associating domains) and selectively binds GTP-bound Ras proteins only. (You can see this interaction in high detail in the PDB box attached to the article. It shows Rap1 in complex with the RBD of c-Raf.)

The C1 domain - immediately downstream of the Ras binding domain - is a special zinc finger, rich in cysteines and stabilized by two zinc ions. It is similar to the diacylglycerol-binding C1 domains of protein kinase C (PKC) enzymes. But unlike PKC, the C1 domains of Raf family kinases do not bind diacylglycerol. Instead, they interact with other lipids, such as ceramide or phosphatidic acid, and even aid in the recognition of activated Ras (GTP-Ras).

The close proximity of these two domains as well as several lines of experimental data suggest that they act as a single unit to negatively regulate the activity of the protein kinase domain, by direct physical interaction. Historically, this autoinhibitory block was labelled as the CR1 region ("Conserved Region 1"), the hinge region being named CR2, and the kinase domain CR3. Unfortunately, the precise structure of the autoinhibited kinase remains unknown.

Between the autoinhibitory domain block and the catalytic kinase domain, a long segment - characteristic to all Raf proteins - can be found. It is highly enriched in serine amino acids, but its precise sequence is poorly conserved across related Raf genes. This region appears to be intrinsically unstructured, and very flexible. Its most likely role is to act as a natural "hinge" between the rigidly folded autoinhibitory and catalytic domains, enabling complex movements and profound conformational rearrangements within the molecule. This hinge region contains a small, conserved island of amino acids, that are responsible for 14-3-3 protein recognition, but only when a critical serine (Ser259 in human c-Raf) is phosphorylated. A second, similar motif is found on the extreme C-terminus (centered around the phosphorylatable Ser 621) of all Raf enzymes, but downstream of the kinase domain.

The C-terminal half of c-Raf folds into a single protein domain, responsible for catalytic activity. The structure of this kinase domain is well known from both c-Raf and B-Raf. It is highly similar to other Raf kinases and KSR proteins, and distinctly similar to some other MAP3 kinases, such as the Mixed Lineage Kinase (MLK) family. Together they comprise the Tyrosine Kinase Like (TKL) group of protein kinases. Although some features unite their catalytic domains with protein tyrosine kinases, the activity of TKLs is restricted to the phosphorylation of serine and threonine residues within target proteins. The most important substrate of Raf kinases (apart from itself) are the MKK1 and MKK2 kinases, whose activity strictly depends on phosphorylation events performed by Rafs.

== Evolutionary relationships ==
Human c-Raf is a member of a larger family of related protein kinases. Two further members – found in most vertebrates – belong to the same family: B-Raf and A-Raf. Apart from the different length of their non-conserved N- and C-terminal ends, they all share the same domain architecture, structure and regulation. In comparison to the relatively well-known c-Raf and B-Raf, there is very little known of the precise function of A-Raf, but it is also thought to be similar to the other two members of the family. All these genes are believed to be the product of full gene or genome duplications at the dawn of vertebrate evolution, from a single ancestral Raf gene. Most other animal organisms possess only a single Raf gene. It is called Phl or Draf in Drosophila and Lin-45 in C. elegans.

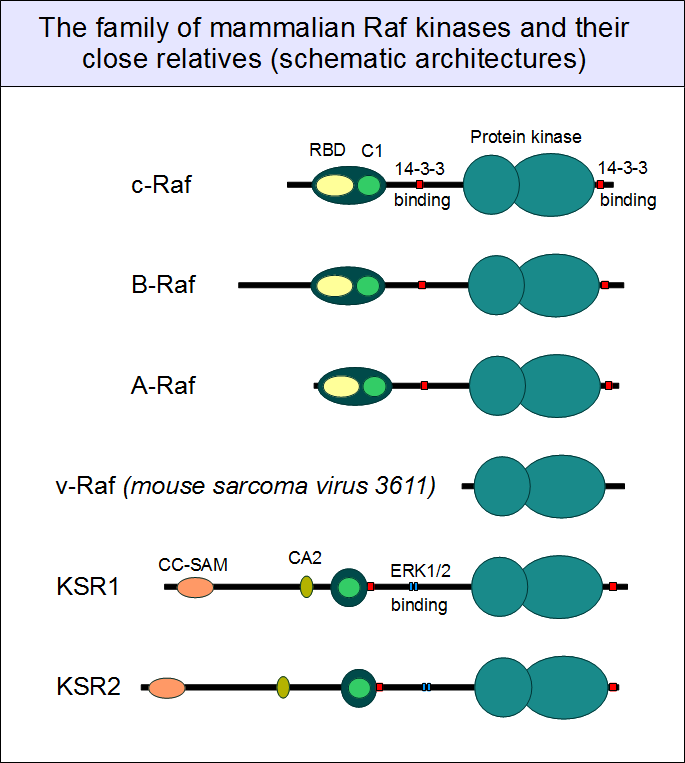
The family of Raf kinases (schematic architectures)

Multicellular animals also have a type of kinase closely related to Raf: this is the Kinase Suppressor of Ras (KSR). Vertebrates like mammals have two, paralogous KSR genes instead of one: KSR1 and KSR2. Their C-terminal kinase domain is very similar to Raf (originally called CA5 in KSR and CR3 in Raf), but the N-terminal regulatory region differs. Although they also have the flexible hinge (CA4 in KSR) and a C1 domain (CA3 in KSR) before it, KSRs entirely lack the Ras-binding domain. Instead, they have unique regulatory regions on their N-termini, originally termed CA1 ("conserved area 1") and CA2. For a long time, the structure of the CA1 domain was a mystery. However, in 2012, the structure of the CA1 region in KSR1 was solved: it turned out to be a divergent SAM (sterile alpha motif) domain, supplemented with coiled-coils (CC-SAM): this is supposed to aid KSRs in membrane binding. KSRs, like Rafs, also have the twin 14-3-3 associating motifs (that depend on phosphorylation), but also possess novel MAPK-binding motifs on their hinge regions. With a typical sequence Phe-x-Phe-Pro (FxFP) these motifs are important for the feedback regulation of Raf kinases in the ERK1/2 pathway. According to our current knowledge, KSRs also participate in the same pathway as Raf, although they only play an auxiliary role. With a very poor intrinsic kinase activity, they were long thought to be inactive, until their catalytic activity was finally demonstrated in recent years. But even then, they contribute only negligibly to MKK1 and MKK2 phosphorylation. The main role of KSR appears to be to provide a heterodimerization partner to Raf enzymes, greatly facilitating their activation by means of allostery. Similar phenomena were described for other MAP3 kinases. ASK2, for example, is a poor enzyme on its own, and its activity appears to be tied to ASK1/ASK2 heterodimerisation.

Raf-like kinases are fully absent from fungi. But recent sequencing of other opisthokonts (e.g. Capsaspora owczarzaki) revealed the presence of genuine Raf kinases in unicellular eukaryotes. Therefore, it is possible that Raf proteins are an ancient heritage and ancestors of fungi secondarily lost Raf-dependent signaling. Fungal MAP kinase pathways that are homologous to the mammalian ERK1/2 pathway (Fus3 and Kss1 in yeast) are activated by MEKK-related kinases (e.g. Ste11 in yeast) instead of Raf enzymes.

Raf kinases found in retroviruses (such as murine v-Raf) are secondarily derived from the corresponding vertebrate genes of their hosts. These Raf genes encode severely truncated proteins, that lack the entire N-terminal autoinhibitory domain, and the 14-3-3 binding motifs. Such severe truncations are known to induce an uncontrolled activity of Raf kinases: that is just exactly what a virus may need for efficient reproduction.

== Regulation of activity ==
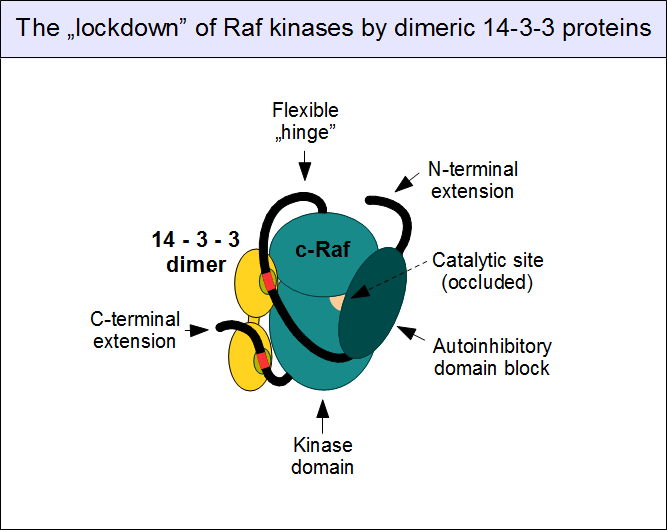
Artist's impression of the autoinhibited state of c-Raf, reinforced by the associated 14-3-3 protein dimers, bound to the phosphorylated twin motifs.

As mentioned above, the regulation of c-Raf activity is complex. As a "gatekeeper" of the ERK1/2 pathway, it is kept in check by a multitude of inhibitory mechanisms, and normally cannot be activated in a single step. The most important regulatory mechanism involves the direct, physical association of the N-terminal autoinhibitory block to the kinase domain of c-Raf. It results in the occlusion of the catalytic site and full shutdown of kinase activity. This "closed" state can only be relieved if the autoinhibitory domain of Raf engages a partner competing with its own kinase domain, most importantly GTP-bound Ras. Activated small G-proteins can thus break up the intramolecular interactions: this results in a conformational change ("opening") of c-Raf necessary for kinase activation and substrate binding.

14-3-3 proteins also contribute to the autoinhibition. As 14-3-3 proteins are all known to form constitutive dimers, their assemblies have two binding sites. Thus the dimer acts as a "molecular handcuff", locking their binding partners at a fixed distance and orientation. When the precisely positioned twin 14-3-3 binding motifs are engaged by a single 14-3-3 protein dimer (such as 14-3-3 zeta), they become locked into a conformation that promotes autoinhibition and does not allow the disengagement of the autoinhibitory and catalytic domains. This "lockdown" of c-Raf (and other Rafs as well as KSRs) is controlled by motif phosphorylation. Unphosphorylated 14-3-3 associating motifs do not bind their partners: they need to get phosphorylated on conserved serines (Ser 259 and Ser 621) first, by other protein kinases. The most important kinase implicated in this event is TGF-beta activated kinase 1 (TAK1), and the enzymes dedicated for removal of these phosphates are the protein phosphatase 1 (PP1) and protein phosphatase 2A (PP2A) complexes.

Note that 14-3-3 binding of Raf enzymes is not necessarily inhibitory: once Raf is open and dimerizes, 14-3-3s can also bind in trans, bridging two kinases and "handcuffing" them together to reinforce the dimer, instead of keeping them away from each other. Further modes of 14-3-3 interactions with c-Raf also exist, but their role is not well known.

Dimerisation is another important mechanism for c-Raf activity regulation and required for Raf activation loop phosphorylation. Normally, only the "open" kinase domains participate in dimerisation. Unlike B-Raf, that readily forms homodimers with itself, c-Raf prefers heterodimerisation with either B-Raf or KSR1. Homodimers and heterodimers all behave similarly. The B-Raf homodimer kinase domain structure clearly shows that the activation loops (that control the catalytic activity of all known protein kinases) are positioned in an active-like conformation in the dimer. This is due to an allosteric effect of the other molecule binding to the "back" side of the kinase; such dimers are symmetric and have two, partially active catalytic sites. At this stage, the activity of Raf kinases is low, and unstable.

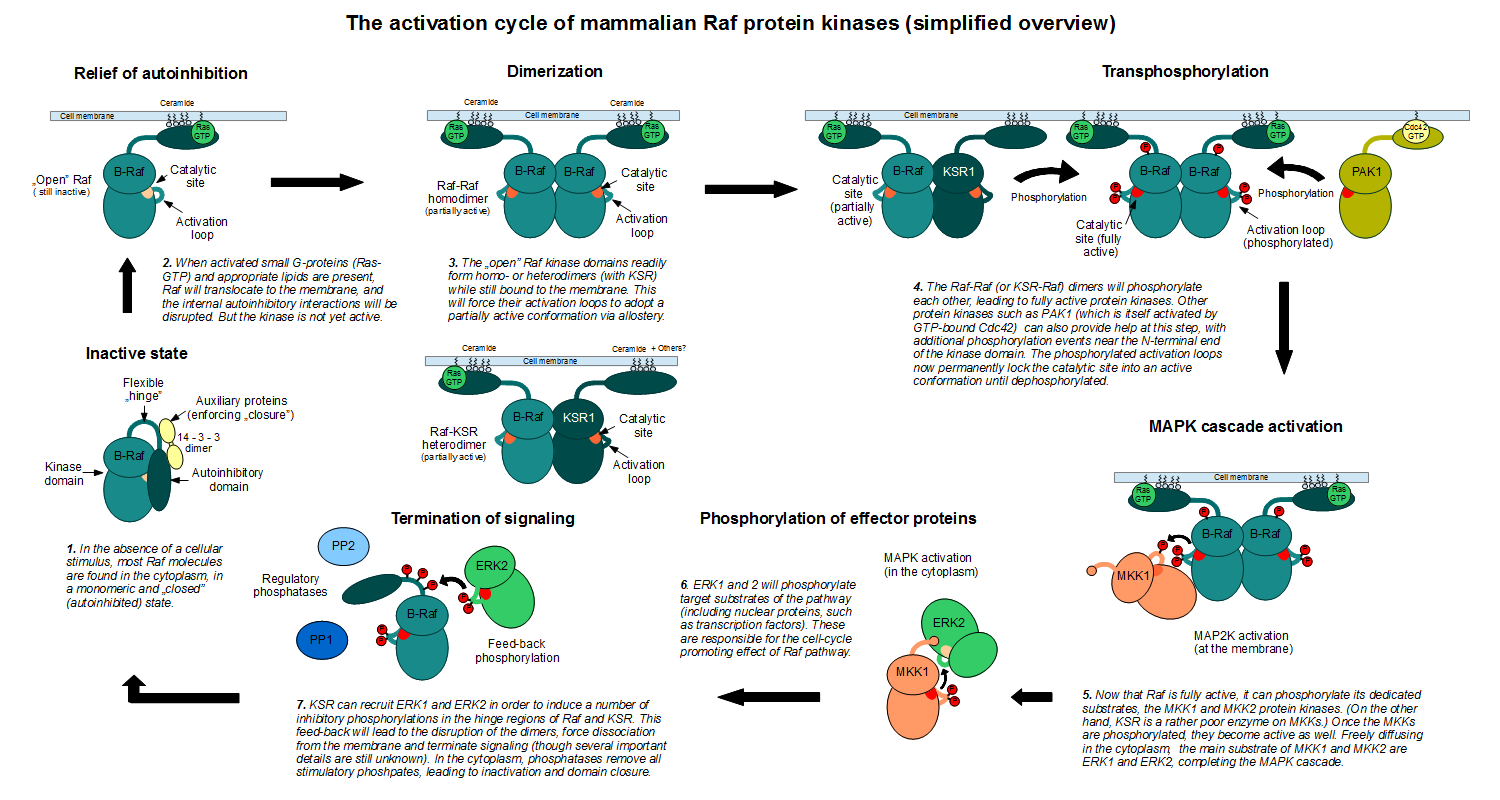
The activation cycle of mammalian Raf proteins, exemplified by B-Raf (a greatly simplified overview, not showing all steps).

To achieve full activity and stabilize the active state, the activation loop of c-Raf needs to be phosphorylated. The only kinases currently known to perform this act are the Raf family kinases themselves. But some other kinases, such as PAK1 can phosphorylate other residues near the kinase domain of c-Raf: the precise role of these auxiliary kinases is unknown. In the context of c-Raf, both c-Raf and KSR1 are needed for the "transphosphorylation" step. Due to the architecture of the dimers, this phosphorylation can only take place in trans (i.e. one dimer phosphorylates another, in a four-membered transitional complex). By interacting with conserved Arg and Lys residues in the kinase domain, the phosphorylated activation loops shift conformation and become ordered, permanently locking the kinase domain into a fully active state until dephosphorylated. The phosphorylated activation loops also render the kinase insensitive to the presence of its autoinhibitory domain. KSRs cannot undergo this last step as they miss any phosphorylatable residues in their activation loops. But once c-Raf is fully activated, there is no further need to do so: active Raf enzymes can now engage their substrates. Like most protein kinases, c-Raf has multiple substrates. BAD (Bcl2-atagonist of cell death) is directly phosphorylated by c-Raf, along with several types of adenylate cyclases, myosin phosphatase (MYPT), cardiac muscle troponin T (TnTc), etc. The retinoblastoma protein (pRb) and Cdc25 phosphatase were also suggested as possible substrates.

The most important targets of all Raf enzymes are MKK1(MEK1) and MKK2(MEK2). Although the structure of the enzyme-substrate complex c-Raf:MKK1 is unknown, it can be precisely modelled after the KSR2:MKK1 complex. Here no actual catalysis takes place, but it is thought to be highly similar to the way Raf binds to its substrates. The main interaction interface is provided by the C-terminal lobes of both kinase domains; the large, disordered, proline-rich loop unique to MKK1 and MKK2 also plays an important role in its positioning to Raf (and KSR). These MKKs become phosphorylated on at least two sites in their activation loops upon binding to Raf: this will activate them too. The targets of the kinase cascade are ERK1 and ERK2, that are selectively activated by MKK1 or MKK2. ERKs have numerous substrates in cells; they are also capable of translocating into the nucleus to activate nuclear transcription factors. Activated ERKs are pleiotropic effectors of cell physiology and play an important role in the control of gene expression involved in the cell division cycle, cell migration, inhibition of apoptosis, and cell differentiation.

== Associated human diseases ==
Hereditary gain-of-function mutations of c-Raf are implicated in some rare, but severe syndromes. Most of these mutations involve single amino acid changes at one of the two 14-3-3 binding motifs. Mutation of c-Raf is one of the possible causes of Noonan syndrome: affected individuals have congenital heart defects, short and dysmorphic stature and several other deformities. Similar mutations in c-Raf can also cause a related condition, termed LEOPARD syndrome (Lentigo, Electrocardiographic abnormalities, Ocular hypertelorism, Pulmonary stenosis, Abnormal genitalia, Retarded growth, Deafness), with a complex association of defects.

== Role in cancer ==
Although c-Raf is very clearly capable of mutating into an oncogene in experimental settings, and even in a few human tumors, its sister kinase B-Raf is the true major player in carcinogenesis in humans.

=== B-Raf mutations ===
Approximately 20% of all examined human tumor samples display a mutated B-Raf gene. The overwhelming majority of these mutations involve the exchange of a single amino acid: Val 600 into Glu, and this aberrant gene product (BRAF-V600E) can be visualized by immunohistochemistry for clinical molecular diagnostics The aberration can mimic the activation loop phosphorylation and - by jumping all control steps at normal activation - immediately render the kinase domain fully active. Since B-Raf can also activate itself by homodimerisation and c-Raf by heterodimerisation, this mutation has a catastrophic effect by turning the ERK1/2 pathway constitutively active, and driving an uncontrolled process of cell division.

== As a therapeutic target ==
Due to the importance of both Ras and B-Raf mutations in tumorigenesis, several Raf inhibitors were developed to combat cancer, especially against B-Raf exhibiting the V600E mutation. Sorafenib was the first clinically useful agent, that provides a pharmacological alternative to treat previously largely untreatable malignancies, such as renal cell carcinoma and melanoma. Several other molecules followed up, such as Vemurafenib, Regorafenib, Dabrafenib, etc.

Unfortunately, ATP-competitive B-Raf inhibitors may have an undesired effect in K-Ras-dependent cancers: They are simply too selective for B-Raf. While they perfectly well inhibit B-Raf activity in case a mutant B-Raf is the primary culprit, they also promote homo- and heterodimerisation of B-Raf, with itself and c-Raf. This will actually enhance c-Raf activation instead of inhibiting it in case there is no mutation in any Raf genes, but their common upstream activator K-Ras protein is the one mutated. This "paradoxical" c-Raf activation necessitates the need to screen for B-Raf mutations in patients (by genetic diagnostics) before starting a B-Raf-inhibitor therapy.

== List of interacting proteins ==
C-Raf has been shown to interact with:

- AKT1,
- ASK1,
- BAG1,
- BRAF,
- Bcl-2,
- CDC25A,
- CFLAR,
- FYN,
- GRB10,
- HRAS,
- HSP90AA1,
- KRAS,
- MAP2K1,
- MAP3K1,
- MAPK7,
- MAPK8IP3,
- PAK1,
- PEBP1,
- PHB,
- PRKCZ,
- RAP1A,
- RHEB,
- RRAS2
- RB1,
- RBL2,
- SHOC2,
- STUB1,
- Src,
- TSC22D3,
- YWHAB,
- YWHAE,
- YWHAG,
- YWHAH,
- YWHAQ, and
- YWHAZ.

== See also ==
- Raf kinases
- A-Raf kinase
- B-Raf kinase
- KSR1 protein
- KSR2 protein
