= MEK inhibitor =

Drug class

A MEK inhibitor is a chemical or drug that inhibits the mitogen-activated protein kinase enzymes MEK1 and/or MEK2. They can be used to affect the MAPK/ERK pathway which is often overactive in some cancers. (Note: See MAPK/ERK pathway#Clinical significance)

Hence MEK inhibitors have potential for treatment of some cancers, especially BRAF-mutated melanoma, and KRAS/BRAF mutated colorectal cancer.

== Approved for clinical use ==
- Binimetinib (MEK162), approved by the FDA in June 2018 in combination with encorafenib for the treatment of patients with unresectable or metastatic BRAF V600E or V600K mutation-positive melanoma.
- Cobimetinib or XL518, approved by US FDA in Nov 2015 for use in combination with vemurafenib (Zelboraf(R)), for treatment of advanced melanoma with a BRAF V600E or V600K mutation.
- Selumetinib, had a phase 2 clinical trial for non-small cell lung cancer (NSCLC) which demonstrated an improvement in PFS, and is now in phase III development in KRAS mutation positive NSCLC (SELECT-1, NCT01933932). Other ph 3 clinical trials underway include uveal melanoma (failed), and differentiated thyroid carcinoma.
- Trametinib (GSK1120212), FDA-approved to treat BRAF-mutated melanoma. Also studied in combination with BRAF inhibitor dabrafenib to treat BRAF-mutated melanoma.

== In clinical trials ==
- PD-325901, for breast cancer, colon cancer, and melanoma A phase II trial for advanced non-small cell lung cancer "did not meet its primary efficacy end point".
- Atebimetinib, for pancreatic cancer

== Others ==
- CI-1040, PD035901
- TAK-733, preclinical for multiple myeloma.
- Zapnometinib

== Pre-clinical investigation ==
Clinically approved MEK inhibitor Cobimetinib has been investigated in combination with PI3K inhibition in pre-clinical models of lung cancer, where the combined treatment approach lead to a synergistic anti-cancer response. Co-targeted therapeutic approaches to have been suggested to induce improved anti-cancer effects, due to blockade of compensatory signalling, prevention or delay of acquired resistance to treatment, and the possibility of reducing dosing of each compound.
