= Luvometinib =

Clinical data
- Trade names: 复迈宁 (Fu Mainin)
- Other names: FCN-159
- Routes of administration: Oral

Identifiers
- IUPAC name: N-[3-[6-Cyclopropyl-3-fluoro-4-(2-fluoro-4-iodoanilino)-1-methyl-2,5-dioxopyrido[2,3-d]pyridazin-8-yl]phenyl]cyclopropanesulfonamide
- CAS Number: 2739690-43-6
- PubChem CID: 135210935
- IUPHAR/BPS: 13495
- UNII: B2DYT4V89X

Chemical and physical data
- Formula: C_{26}H_{22}F_{2}IN_{5}O_{4}S
- Molar mass: 665.45 g·mol^{−1}
- 3D model (JSmol): Interactive image
- SMILES: CN1C2=C(C(=C(C1=O)F)NC3=C(C=C(C=C3)I)F)C(=O)N(N=C2C4=CC(=CC=C4)NS(=O)(=O)C5CC5)C6CC6
- InChI: InChI=1S/C26H22F2IN5O4S/c1-33-24-20(23(21(28)26(33)36)30-19-10-5-14(29)12-18(19)27)25(35)34(16-6-7-16)31-22(24)13-3-2-4-15(11-13)32-39(37,38)17-8-9-17/h2-5,10-12,16-17,30,32H,6-9H2,1H3; Key:RJFDJJABNSVLRB-UHFFFAOYSA-N

Luvometinib is a drug for the treatment of various types of cancer. It is a selective, orally administered inhibitor of mitogen-activated protein kinase kinases 1 and 2 (MEK1/MEK2), developed by Fosun Pharma for the treatment of rare malignancies, especially those driven by abnormal abnormal mitogen-activated protein kinase (MAPK) activation.

In May 2025, it was approved in China for the treatment of histiocytic neoplasms such as Langerhans cell histiocytosis (LCH) and the genetic disease neurofibromatosis type 1 (NF1).
