= Zapnometinib =

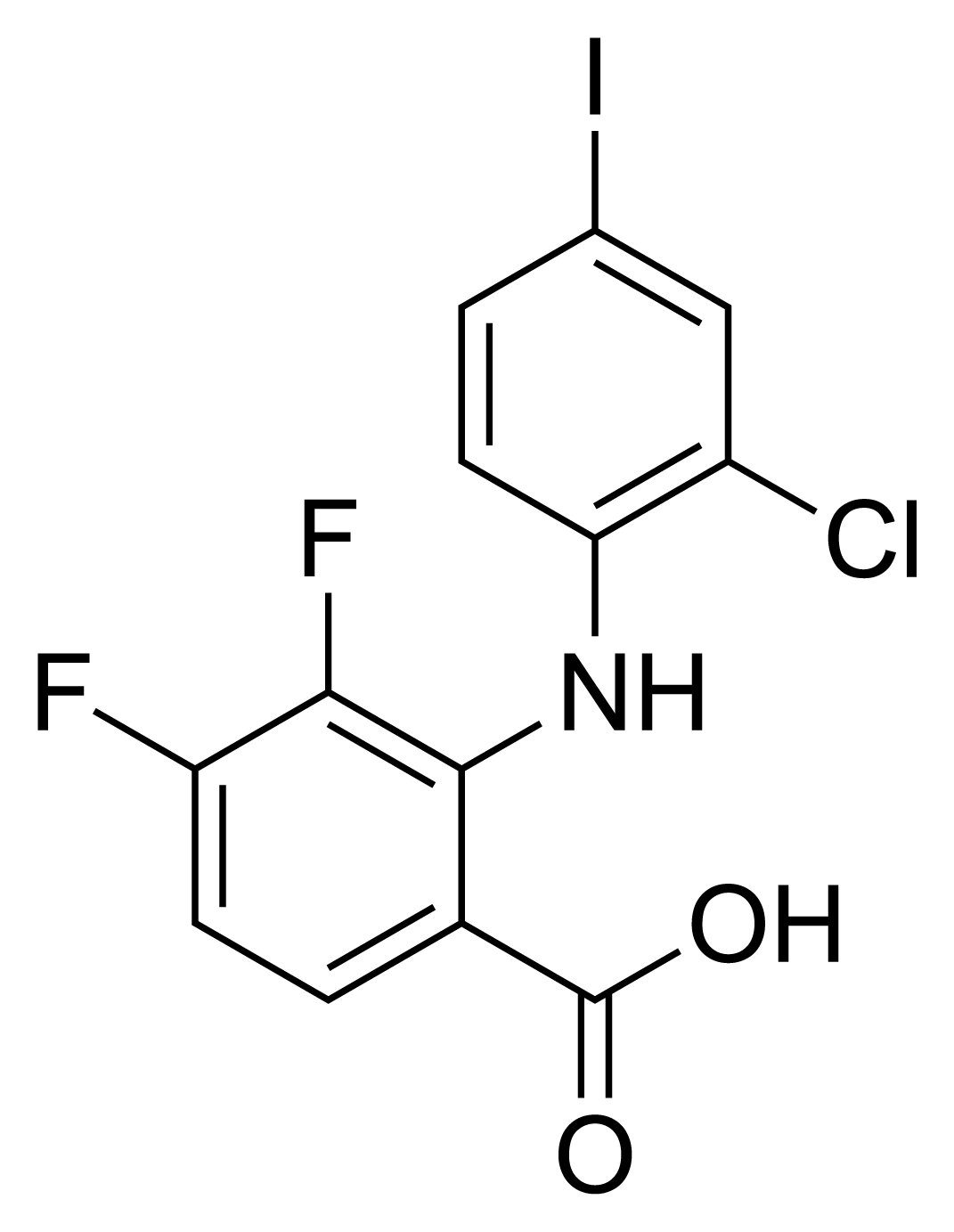

Clinical data
- Other names: ATR002, PD-0184264
- Drug class: Mek inhibitor

Identifiers
- IUPAC name: 2-(2-chloro-4-iodoanilino)-3,4-difluorobenzoic acid
- CAS Number: 303175-44-2
- PubChem CID: 10112191
- IUPHAR/BPS: 11679
- UNII: 4RZD8LK83V
- ChEMBL: ChEMBL481949
- CompTox Dashboard (EPA): DTXSID80435811
- ECHA InfoCard: 100.351.768

Chemical and physical data
- Formula: C_{13}H_{7}ClF_{2}INO_{2}
- Molar mass: 409.56 g·mol^{−1}
- 3D model (JSmol): Interactive image
- SMILES: C1=CC(=C(C=C1I)Cl)NC2=C(C=CC(=C2F)F)C(=O)O
- InChI: InChI=1S/C13H7ClF2INO2/c14-8-5-6(17)1-4-10(8)18-12-7(13(19)20)2-3-9(15)11(12)16/h1-5,18H,(H,19,20); Key:XCNBGWKQXRQKSA-UHFFFAOYSA-N

Zapnometinib (PD-0184264, ATR-002) is a pharmaceutical drug which is a selective MEK inhibitor.

It is the active carboxylic acid metabolite of CI‑1040 (PD‑184352), a first‑generation MEK1/2 inhibitor originally developed by Pfizer for oncology indications. It was subsequently repurposed and clinically advanced by Atriva Therapeutics GmbH as a host‑targeted antiviral drug against RNA viruses whose mechanism of action is complemented by immunomodulatory effects.

Zapnometinib acts as a host‑targeted antiviral by inhibiting cellular MEK1/2 in the Raf/MEK/ERK signaling cascade, a pathway many RNA viruses co‑opt to complete their replication cycle. Blocking MEK1/2 prevents efficient nuclear export and assembly of viral ribonucleoprotein complexes.

It has potential applications in the treatment of cancer, but has mainly been investigated for its antiviral properties, showing activity against several acute viral infections such as influenza, COVID-19 and hantavirus.

== See also ==
- Favipiravir
- Selumetinib
- Vandetanib
