= KSR2 =

Protein-coding gene in the species Homo sapiens

Identifiers
- Aliases: KSR2, kinase suppressor of ras 2
- External IDs: OMIM: 610737; MGI: 3610315; GeneCards: KSR2
Available structures
PDB	Ortholog search: PDBe RCSB
PDB	List of PDB id codes 2Y4I
Enzyme activity
EC #	BRENDA	ExPASy	KEGG	MetaCyc
2.7.11.1	↗	↗	↗	↗

Gene location (Human)
Chr.	Chromosome 12 (human)
Band	12q24.22-q24.23	Start	117,453,012 bp
Band	12q24.22-q24.23	End	117,968,990 bp

Gene location (Mouse)
Chr.	Chromosome 5 (mouse)
Band	5|5 F	Start	117,552,065 bp
Band	5|5 F	End	117,913,068 bp
RNA expression pattern
Bgee	Human / Mouse (ortholog); Top expressed in: Brodmann area 23; middle temporal gyrus; postcentral gyrus; endothelial cell; entorhinal cortex; superior frontal gyrus; primary visual cortex; buccal mucosa cell; cerebellar vermis; Brodmann area 46 / Top expressed in: zygote; dentate gyrus of hippocampal formation granule cell; primary visual cortex; superior frontal gyrus; cerebellar cortex; secondary oocyte; lumbar subsegment of spinal cord; neural layer of retina; hippocampus proper; amygdala; More reference expression data
BioGPS	n/a
Gene ontology
Molecular function	transferase activity; nucleotide binding; protein serine/threonine kinase activity; ATP binding; metal ion binding; kinase activity; protein kinase activity; signal transducer activity; protein binding
Cellular component	cytoplasm; membrane; cytosol; plasma membrane
Biological process	intracellular signal transduction; phosphorylation; protein phosphorylation; Ras protein signal transduction; calcium-mediated signaling; positive regulation of MAPK cascade; positive regulation of cold-induced thermogenesis
Sources:Amigo / QuickGO
Orthologs
Databases	NCBI: entry; OMA: entry
Species	Human	Mouse
Entrez	283455	333050
Ensembl	ENSG00000171435	ENSMUSG00000061578
UniProt	Q6VAB6	Q3UVC0
RefSeq (mRNA)	NM_173598	NM_001034873; NM_001114545; NM_001312914
RefSeq (protein)	NP_775869	NP_001299843
Location (UCSC)	Chr 12: 117.45 – 117.97 Mb	Chr 5: 117.55 – 117.91 Mb
PubMed search
- Wikidata
View/Edit Human	View/Edit Mouse

KSR2 is a gene which encodes Kinase Suppressor of Ras 2 in humans.

The encoded protein plays a role in energy homeostasis, including fatty acid oxidation, glucose metabolism and basal metabolic rate (BMR). As a result, subsequent mutations in this gene, albeit rare, have been linked to the development of early on-set obesity and insulin resistance.

Variations within the gene and its expression are hypothesized to play a key role in the phenotype of individuals with metabolic disease, alongside leptin-deficiency induced hyperphagia. While the exact mechanism is unclear, it is believed that KSR2 variations result in a disruption of the MAPK/ERK pathway, which can in turn lower the body's BMR. Since this normally accounts for about 70% of the total energy expenditure, a decrease results in excess energy storage, compared to an individual with a normal BMR on an isocaloric diet.

Besides human metabolism, KSR2 is also crucial for ovarian development in the cabbage beetle Colaphellus bowringi.

== See also ==
- KSR1
