= RRAS2 =

Protein-coding gene in the species Homo sapiens

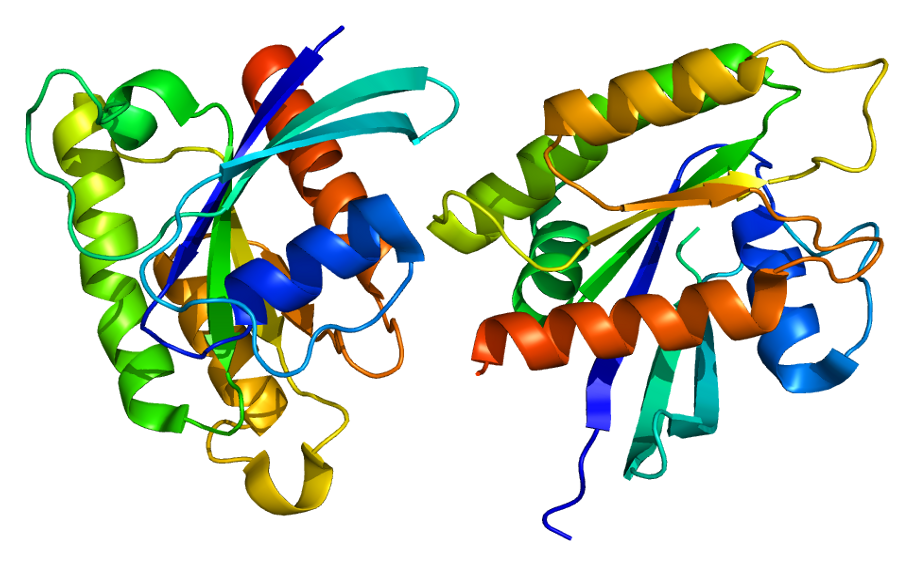

Identifiers
- Aliases: RRAS2, TC21, related RAS viral (r-ras) oncogene homolog 2, RAS related 2, NS12
- External IDs: OMIM: 600098; MGI: 1914172; GeneCards: RRAS2
Available structures
PDB	Ortholog search: PDBe RCSB
PDB	List of PDB id codes 2ERY
Enzyme activity
EC #	BRENDA	ExPASy	KEGG	MetaCyc
3.6.5.2	↗	↗	↗	↗

Gene location (Human)
Chr.	Chromosome 11 (human)
Band	11p15.2	Start	14,277,922 bp
Band	11p15.2	End	14,364,506 bp

Gene location (Mouse)
Chr.	Chromosome 7 (mouse)
Band	7|7 F1	Start	113,646,017 bp
Band	7|7 F1	End	113,717,016 bp
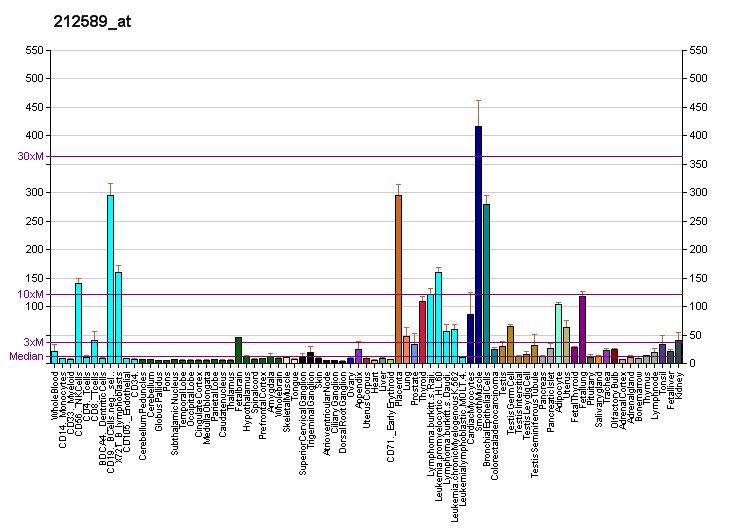

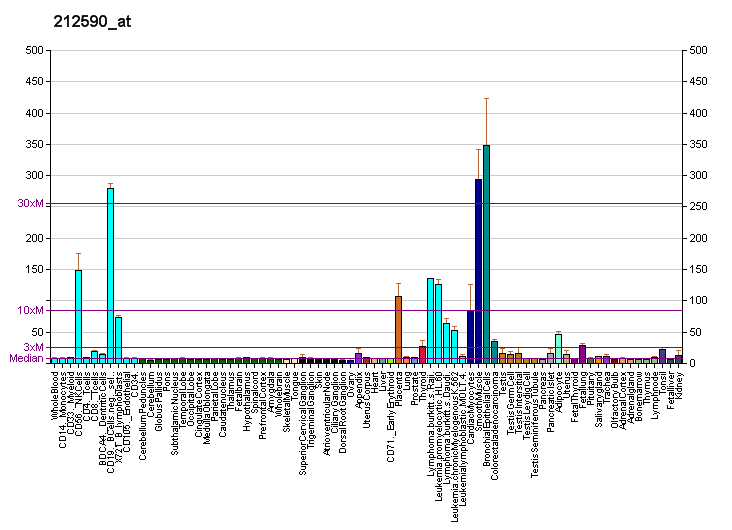

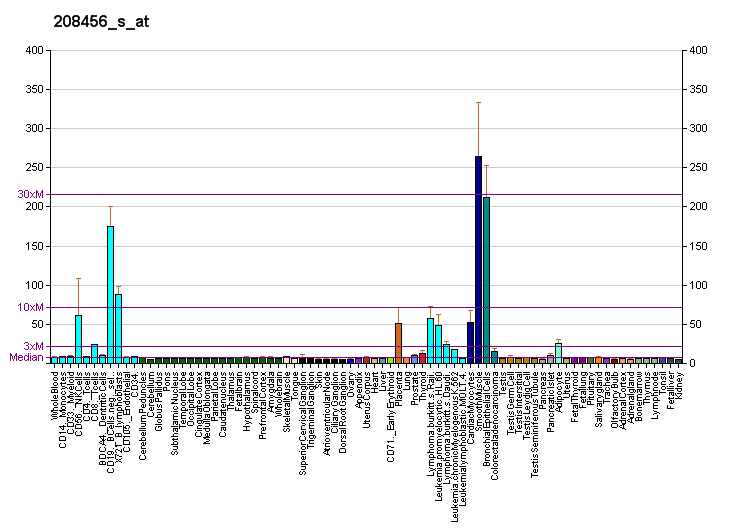
RNA expression pattern
Bgee	Human / Mouse (ortholog); Top expressed in: secondary oocyte; Skeletal muscle tissue of rectus abdominis; epithelium of colon; kidney tubule; biceps brachii; Skeletal muscle tissue of biceps brachii; thoracic diaphragm; glutes; mucosa of paranasal sinus; germinal epithelium / Top expressed in: interventricular septum; endothelial cell of lymphatic vessel; decidua; endocardial cushion; medullary collecting duct; gastrula; renal corpuscle; left lung lobe; atrioventricular valve; stroma of bone marrow; More reference expression data
BioGPS	More reference expression data
Gene ontology
Molecular function	nucleotide binding; GTP binding; protein binding; GTPase activity; GDP binding
Cellular component	plasma membrane; extracellular exosome; intracellular anatomical structure; endoplasmic reticulum; membrane; focal adhesion
Biological process	cellular process or phenomenon; Ras protein signal transduction; osteoblast differentiation; regulation of neuron death; signal transduction; positive regulation of cell migration
Sources:Amigo / QuickGO
Orthologs
Databases	NCBI: entry; OMA: entry
Species	Human	Mouse
Entrez	22800	66922
Ensembl	ENSG00000133818	ENSMUSG00000055723
UniProt	P62070	P62071
RefSeq (mRNA)	NM_012250; NM_001102669; NM_001177314; NM_001177315	NM_025846
RefSeq (protein)	NP_001096139; NP_001170785; NP_001170786; NP_036382	NP_080122
Location (UCSC)	Chr 11: 14.28 – 14.36 Mb	Chr 7: 113.65 – 113.72 Mb
PubMed search
- Wikidata
View/Edit Human	View/Edit Mouse

Ras-related protein R-Ras2 is a protein that in humans is encoded by the RRAS2 gene.

== Interactions ==
RRAS2 has been shown to interact with C-Raf.
