= Atebimetinib =

Investigational drug

Clinical data
- Other names: IMM-1-104

Identifiers
- IUPAC name: [4-[(dimethylamino)methyl]-3-[[2-fluoro-3-(methylsulfamoylamino)phenyl]methyl]-2-oxochromen-7-yl] N,N-dimethylcarbamate
- CAS Number: 2669009-92-9
- PubChem CID: 168111901
- IUPHAR/BPS: 13733
- UNII: TEL9243A3N
- KEGG: D13350

Chemical and physical data
- Formula: C_{23}H_{27}FN_{4}O_{6}S
- Molar mass: 506.55 g·mol^{−1}
- 3D model (JSmol): Interactive image
- SMILES: CNS(=O)(=O)NC1=CC=CC(=C1F)CC2=C(C3=C(C=C(C=C3)OC(=O)N(C)C)OC2=O)CN(C)C
- InChI: InChI=InChI=1S/C23H27FN4O6S/c1-25-35(31,32)26-19-8-6-7-14(21(19)24)11-17-18(13-27(2)3)16-10-9-15(33-23(30)28(4)5)12-20(16)34-22(17)29/h6-10,12,25-26H,11,13H2,1-5H3; Key:VGDONWMTHHBKMZ-UHFFFAOYSA-N

Atebimetinib is an investigational new drug that is being developed by Immuneering Corporation for the treatment of pancreatic cancer. It is a dual MEK1/MEK2 inhibitor of mitogen-activated protein kinase kinase.
