= ARAF =

Protein-coding gene in humans

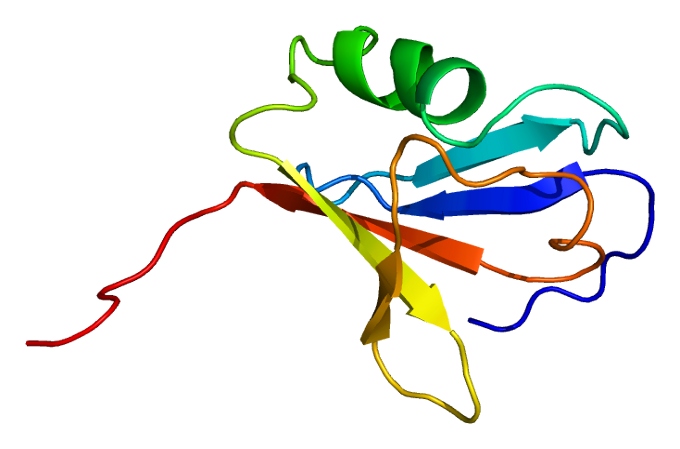

Identifiers
- Aliases: ARAF, A-Raf proto-oncogene, serine/threonine kinase, A-RAF, ARAF1, PKS2, RAFA1, Serine/threonine-protein kinase A-Raf
- External IDs: OMIM: 311010; MGI: 88065; GeneCards: ARAF
Available structures
| PDB | Ortholog search: PDBe RCSB |
| PDB | List of PDB id codes 1WXM, 2MSE |
Enzyme activity
| EC # | BRENDA | ExPASy | KEGG | MetaCyc |
|---|---|---|---|---|
| 2.7.11.1 | ↗ | ↗ | ↗ | ↗ |

Gene location (Human)
| Chr. | X chromosome (human) |
| Band | Xp11.3 | Start | 47,561,205 bp |
| Band | Xp11.3 | End | 47,571,908 bp |

Gene location (Mouse)
| Chr. | X chromosome (mouse) |
| Band | X A1.3|X 16.3 cM | Start | 20,664,053 bp |
| Band | X A1.3|X 16.3 cM | End | 20,726,758 bp |
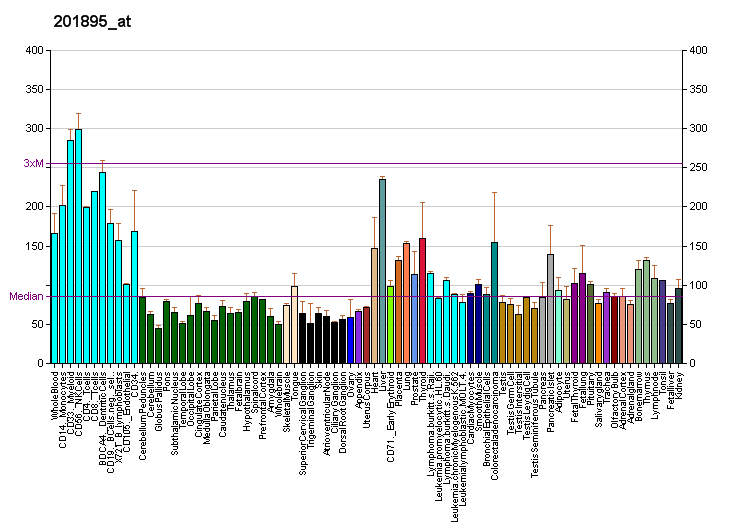
RNA expression pattern
| Bgee | Human / Mouse (ortholog); Top expressed in: muscle of thigh; granulocyte; gastrocnemius muscle; body of stomach; apex of heart; body of pancreas; right lobe of liver; gastric mucosa; transverse colon; left uterine tube / Top expressed in: dorsomedial hypothalamic nucleus; lateral hypothalamus; mammillary body; neural layer of retina; ventral tegmental area; paraventricular nucleus of hypothalamus; ventromedial nucleus; lateral septal nucleus; arcuate nucleus; dentate gyrus of hippocampal formation granule cell; More reference expression data |
| BioGPS | More reference expression data |
Gene ontology
| Molecular function | transferase activity; protein kinase activity; nucleotide binding; metal ion binding; kinase activity; protein serine/threonine kinase activity; protein binding; ATP binding; MAP kinase kinase kinase activity; mitogen-activated protein kinase kinase binding |
| Cellular component | mitochondrion; cytosol; cellular component |
| Biological process | intracellular signal transduction; regulation of TOR signaling; phosphorylation; negative regulation of apoptotic process; positive regulation of peptidyl-serine phosphorylation; MAPK cascade; protein phosphorylation; regulation of proteasomal ubiquitin-dependent protein catabolic process; signal transduction; multicellular organism development; negative regulation of signal transduction; cell differentiation; positive regulation of ERK1 and ERK2 cascade |
Sources:Amigo / QuickGO
Orthologs
| Databases | NCBI: entry; OMA: entry |
| Species | Human | Mouse |
| Entrez | 369 | 11836 |
| Ensembl | ENSG00000078061 | ENSMUSG00000001127 |
| UniProt | P10398; Q96II5 | P04627 |
| RefSeq (mRNA) | NM_001256196; NM_001256197; NM_001654 | NM_001159645; NM_009703 |
| RefSeq (protein) | NP_001243125; NP_001243126; NP_001645; NP_001243125.1 | NP_001153117; NP_033833 |
| Location (UCSC) | Chr X: 47.56 – 47.57 Mb | Chr X: 20.66 – 20.73 Mb |
| PubMed search |
- Wikidata
| View/Edit Human | View/Edit Mouse |

Serine/threonine-protein kinase A-Raf, or simply A-Raf, is an enzyme that in humans is encoded by the ARAF gene. It belongs to the Raf kinase family of serine/threonine-specific protein kinases, which also includes Raf-1 and B-Raf. A-Raf is involved in the MAPK/ERK pathway, where it contributes to cell signaling processes that regulate proliferation, survival, and differentiation. Compared to Raf-1 and B-Raf, A-Raf is less well studied and exhibits distinct structural and regulatory features, including low kinase activity and alternative splicing in cancer. In addition to its role in MAPK signaling, A-Raf has functions in apoptosis suppression, cancer metabolism, and endocytic trafficking.

== Structure ==
A-Raf, a member of the Raf kinase family, shares a conserved domain architecture with B-Raf and C-Raf, comprising three conserved regions: CR1, CR2, and CR3.

- CR1 (Conserved Region 1): This N-terminal region contains the Ras-binding domain (RBD) and the cysteine-rich domain (CRD). The RBD facilitates interaction with activated Ras-GTP, anchoring A-Raf to the plasma membrane. The CRD, characterized by its zinc-binding motif, contributes to membrane association and protein-protein interactions Structural studies confirm the RBD and CRD function as a single entity during Ras binding.
- CR2 (Conserved Region 2): Positioned between CR1 and CR3, CR2 is a serine/threonine-rich regulatory segment containing phosphorylation sites (e.g., Ser259 in Raf-1) that modulate A-Raf's activity and interactions with 14-3-3 proteins. This region is critical for autoinhibition and activation dynamics.
- CR3 (Conserved Region 3): The C-terminal kinase domain exhibits the bilobal architecture characteristic of protein kinases, with an ATP-binding site between the N-terminal and C-terminal lobes. Structural analyses reveal similarities to tyrosine kinase-like (TKL) group members

The RBD adopts a ubiquitin-like fold critical for Ras-GTP interaction., while the CRD's zinc-binding motif stabilizes membrane association. A-Raf's activity is regulated by phosphorylation-dependent 14-3-3 binding. and isoform dimerization, which is essential for MAPK pathway activation.

== Function ==
A-Raf shares the canonical role of Raf kinases in the MAPK signaling cascade. Upon activation by Ras, A-Raf translocates from the cytosol to the plasma membrane, where it phosphorylates and activates MEK proteins. This activation leads to downstream ERK signaling and promotes cell cycle progression and proliferation.

Among the Raf isoforms, A-Raf exhibits the lowest kinase activity toward MEK proteins. This may be due to amino acid substitutions in a negatively charged region upstream of the kinase domain (the N-region), which result in low basal activity.

A-Raf is also the only Raf kinase known to be regulated by steroid hormones. In its inactive form, A-Raf is bound to 14-3-3 proteins in the cytosol; activation by Ras causes its translocation to the plasma membrane.

Beyond the MAPK pathway, A-Raf has additional functions. It inhibits MST2, a proapoptotic kinase, thereby suppressing apoptosis. This inhibitory activity is dependent on the expression of full-length A-Raf protein, which is maintained by the splicing factor hnRNP H.

A-Raf also regulates energy metabolism by interacting with pyruvate kinase M2 (PKM2), a key enzyme in cancer cell glycolysis. By promoting a conformational shift from the dimeric to the tetrameric form of PKM2, A-Raf enhances its enzymatic activity and shifts glucose utilization from biosynthesis toward energy production.

In addition, A-Raf has been implicated in endocytic membrane trafficking. Upon activation by receptor tyrosine kinases and Ras, A-Raf localizes to phosphatidylinositol 4,5-bisphosphate (PtdIns(4,5)P_{2})-rich membranes and signals to endosomes, leading to activation of ARF6, a key regulator of endocytosis.

== Clinical significance ==
A-Raf may contribute to tumorigenesis through multiple mechanisms. In cancer cells, overexpression of hnRNP H enhances the production of full-length A-Raf, which inhibits MST2 and prevents apoptosis. The downregulation of hnRNP H, in contrast, leads to alternative splicing of the ARAF gene and loss of this anti-apoptotic activity.

A-Raf's regulation of PKM2 activity further links it to cancer metabolism. By promoting glycolytic flux toward pyruvate and lactate production, A-Raf may help sustain the high energy demands of rapidly proliferating tumor cells.

Because A-Raf modulates both apoptosis and metabolism—two critical hallmarks of cancer—it may represent a potential target for future cancer therapies.

== Interactions ==
ARAF has been shown to interact with:

- EFEMP1,
- MAP2K2,
- PRPF6,
- RRAS,
- TIMM44, and
- TH1L.
