= Array BioPharma =

- Type: Subsidiary
- Traded as: Nasdaq: ARRY
- Industry: Oncology; Medication
- Founded: 1998; 28 years ago
- Founder: Drs. Tony Piscopio; Kevin Koch; David Snitman; K.C. Nicolaou
- Headquarters: Boulder, Colorado, United States
- Revenue: $173.8 million (2018)
- Parent: Pfizer
- Website: www.arraybiopharma.com

Array BioPharma is an American clinical stage, pharmaceutical company that focuses on oncology medication headquartered in Boulder, Colorado. The company is currently a subsidiary of Pfizer after being acquired for $11 billion in 2019.

== History ==
Array BioPharma was founded in Boulder, Colorado, in 1998 by Tony Piscopio, Kevin Koch, David Snitman and K. C. Nicolaou. The company initially concentrated on small-molecule drug discovery, carrying out research programmes for its own development pipeline and through agreements with pharmaceutical companies. In November 2000, the company became a public company via an initial public offering.

The company's research business involved identifying and developing compounds that could be licensed to larger pharmaceutical manufacturers for further clinical testing and commercialization. Array entered into agreements with companies including AstraZeneca, Genentech, Celgene and Novartis. These arrangements provided research funding and, depending on the agreement, opportunities to receive payments tied to clinical, regulatory or commercial milestones.

In March 2017, Array withdrew its application to the U.S. Food and Drug Administration (FDA) for approval of binimetinib as a treatment for NRAS-mutant melanoma. The decision followed discussions with the agency about the Phase III NEMO trial, whose results were considered insufficient to support approval. Array continued developing binimetinib in combination with encorafenib for patients with BRAF-mutant melanoma.

In June 2018, the FDA approved Braftovi (encorafenib) and Mektovi (binimetinib) for use together in patients with unresectable or metastatic melanoma carrying a BRAF V600E or V600K mutation. The approval followed the Phase III COLUMBUS trial, which found improved progression-free survival with the combination compared with vemurafenib. The results were published in ''The Lancet Oncology''.

Array was also involved in the BEACON CRC trial, which evaluated treatment combinations involving encorafenib, binimetinib and cetuximab in patients with previously treated BRAF V600E-mutant metastatic colorectal cancer. Results published in ''The New England Journal of Medicine'' in 2019 showed improved overall survival with the experimental combinations compared with the control treatment.

In June 2019, Pfizer acquired the company for approximately $11 billion.

== Discovery of FDA Approved Small Molecules ==
- MEKTOVI (Binimetinib) - selective MEK inhibitor - Approved 2018, acquired by Pfizer
- TUKYSA (Tucatinib) - HER2 inhibitor - Approved 2020, owned by Seagen (Seattle Genetics)
- BRAFTOVI (Encorafenib) - BRAF inhibitor - Approved 2018, acquired by Pfizer
- KRAZATI (Adagrasib) - KRasG12C mutation inhibitor - Approved 2022, collaboration with Mirati Therapeutics
- KOSELUGO (Selumetinib) - MEK1/2 inhibitor - Approved 2020, licensed by Astrazeneca
- VITRAKVI (Larotrectinib) - TRK Inhibitor - Approved 2018, licensed by Loxo Oncology (Eli Lilly)
- RETEVMO (Selpercatinib) - RET inhibitor - Approved 2024, licensed by Loxo Oncology (Eli Lilly)
- GANOVO (Danoprevir) - HCV Protease inhibitor - Approved 2018 (in China), licensed by Roche

== Legal disputes ==
=== Securities litigation ===
Array faced a securities class-action lawsuit over statements made about the regulatory prospects of binimetinib. Investors alleged that the company had misled shareholders about the likelihood of FDA approval for the drug as a treatment for NRAS-mutant melanoma. The claims concerned disclosures made before Array withdrew its application in March 2017. In 2021, the parties reached an $8.5 million settlement. A federal judge in Colorado granted final approval in December of that year, resolving the claims without a determination of liability.

=== AstraZeneca royalty dispute ===
In December 2017, Array sued AstraZeneca over payments associated with selumetinib, a drug it had licensed to the pharmaceutical company under a 2003 agreement. Array alleged that AstraZeneca's collaboration with Merck triggered additional royalty obligations and sought at least $192 million. AstraZeneca disputed the claim. The dispute was resolved in May 2022, according to AstraZeneca's subsequent regulatory disclosures. The financial terms of the resolution were not specified in the disclosure.
