= EFEMP1 =

Protein-coding gene in the species Homo sapiens

Identifiers
- Aliases: EFEMP1, DHRD, DRAD, FBLN3, FBNL, FIBL-3, MLVT, MTLV, S1-5, EGF containing fibulin like extracellular matrix protein 1, EGF containing fibulin extracellular matrix protein 1
- External IDs: OMIM: 601548; MGI: 1339998; GeneCards: EFEMP1

Gene location (Human)
Chr.	Chromosome 2 (human)
Band	2p16.1	Start	55,865,967 bp
Band	2p16.1	End	55,924,139 bp

Gene location (Mouse)
Chr.	Chromosome 11 (mouse)
Band	11|11 A3.3	Start	28,803,204 bp
Band	11|11 A3.3	End	28,876,743 bp
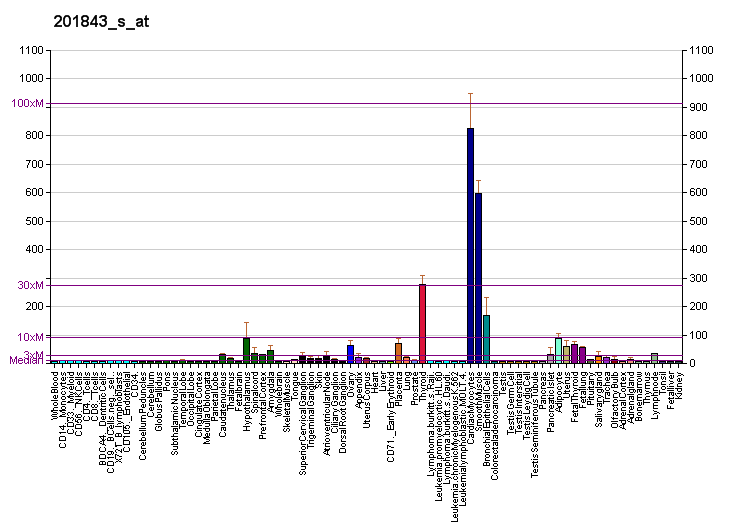

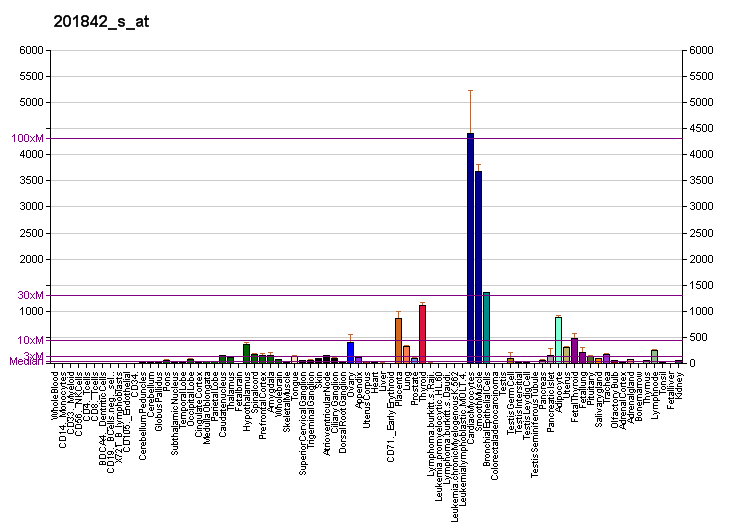
RNA expression pattern
Bgee	Human / Mouse (ortholog); Top expressed in: right coronary artery; Descending thoracic aorta; ascending aorta; synovial joint; germinal epithelium; parietal pleura; Epithelium of choroid plexus; retinal pigment epithelium; pericardium; left coronary artery / Top expressed in: ciliary body; iris; conjunctival fornix; sciatic nerve; vestibular membrane of cochlear duct; right lung lobe; cornea; white adipose tissue; external carotid artery; tunica adventitia of aorta; More reference expression data
BioGPS	More reference expression data
Gene ontology
Molecular function	calcium ion binding; epidermal growth factor receptor binding; epidermal growth factor-activated receptor activity; protein binding; growth factor activity; extracellular matrix structural constituent
Cellular component	extracellular matrix; extracellular exosome; extracellular space; extracellular region; collagen-containing extracellular matrix
Biological process	regulation of transcription, DNA-templated; epidermal growth factor receptor signaling pathway; embryonic eye morphogenesis; post-embryonic eye morphogenesis; negative regulation of chondrocyte differentiation; peptidyl-tyrosine phosphorylation; camera-type eye development; visual perception; regulation of signaling receptor activity
Sources:Amigo / QuickGO
Orthologs
Databases	NCBI: entry; OMA: entry
Species	Human	Mouse
Entrez	2202	216616
Ensembl	ENSG00000115380	ENSMUSG00000020467
UniProt	Q12805	Q8BPB5
RefSeq (mRNA)	NM_001039348; NM_001039349; NM_004105; NM_018894	NM_146015
RefSeq (protein)	NP_001034437; NP_001034438	NP_666127
Location (UCSC)	Chr 2: 55.87 – 55.92 Mb	Chr 11: 28.8 – 28.88 Mb
PubMed search
- Wikidata
View/Edit Human	View/Edit Mouse

EGF-containing fibulin-like extracellular matrix protein 1 is a protein that in humans is encoded by the EFEMP1 gene.

== Gene ==
This gene encodes a member of the fibulin family of extracellular matrix glycoproteins. Like all members of this family, the encoded protein contains tandemly repeated epidermal growth factor-like repeats followed by a C-terminus fibulin-type domain. This gene is upregulated in malignant gliomas and may play a role in the aggressive nature of these tumors. Mutations in this gene are associated with Doyne honeycomb retinal dystrophy and with predisposition to hernias. Alternatively spliced transcript variants that encode the same protein have been described.[provided by RefSeq, Nov 2009]. This gene spans approximately 18 kb of genomic DNA and consists of 12 exons. Alternative splice patterns in the 5' UTR result in three transcript variants encoding the same extracellular matrix protein.

== Clinical significance ==
Mutations in this gene are associated with Doyne honeycomb retinal dystrophy and with predisposition to hernias.

Recently, further EFEMP1 variants have been reported linked to separate, late-onset forms of inherited retinal degeneration.

EFEMP1/Fibulin-3 has recently been reported as a potential biomarker to facilitate the identification of patients with pleural mesothelioma.

== Interactions ==
EFEMP1 has been shown to interact with ARAF.
