= Encorafenib =

Chemical compound

Clinical data
- Trade names: Braftovi
- Other names: LGX818
- AHFS/Drugs.com: Monograph
- MedlinePlus: a618040
- License data: US DailyMed: Encorafenib
- Routes of administration: By mouth
- Drug class: Antineoplastic agent
- ATC code: L01EC03 (WHO)

Legal status
- Legal status: CA: ℞-only; US: ℞-only; EU: Rx-only

Identifiers
- IUPAC name: Methyl [(2S)-1-{[4-(3-{5-chloro-2-fluoro-3-[(methylsulfonyl)amino]phenyl}-1-isopropyl-1H-pyrazol-4-yl)-2-pyrimidinyl]amino}-2-propanyl]carbamate
- CAS Number: 1269440-17-6
- PubChem CID: 50922675
- DrugBank: DB11718
- ChemSpider: 28536139
- UNII: 8L7891MRB6
- KEGG: D11053
- ChEMBL: ChEMBL3301612
- CompTox Dashboard (EPA): DTXSID00155347

Chemical and physical data
- Formula: C_{22}H_{27}ClFN_{7}O_{4}S
- Molar mass: 540.01 g·mol^{−1}
- 3D model (JSmol): Interactive image
- SMILES: C[C@@H](CNc1nccc(n1)c2cn(nc2c3cc(cc(c3F)NS(=O)(=O)C)Cl)C(C)C)NC(=O)OC
- InChI: InChI=1S/C22H27ClFN7O4S/c1-12(2)31-11-16(17-6-7-25-21(28-17)26-10-13(3)27-22(32)35-4)20(29-31)15-8-14(23)9-18(19(15)24)30-36(5,33)34/h6-9,11-13,30H,10H2,1-5H3,(H,27,32)(H,25,26,28)/t13-/m0/s1; Key:CMJCXYNUCSMDBY-ZDUSSCGKSA-N

Encorafenib, sold under the brand name Braftovi, is an anti-cancer medication used for the treatment of certain melanoma cancers. It is a small molecule BRAF inhibitor that targets key enzymes in the MAPK signaling pathway. This pathway occurs in many different cancers including melanoma and colorectal cancers.

The most common (≥25%) adverse reactions include fatigue, nausea, diarrhea, vomiting, abdominal pain, and arthralgia.

Encorafenib was developed by Novartis and Array BioPharma. In June 2018, it was approved by the FDA in combination with binimetinib for the treatment of people with unresectable or metastatic BRAF V600E or V600K mutation-positive melanoma.

== Medical uses ==
Encorafenib is indicated in combination with binimetinib, for the treatment of people with unresectable or metastatic melanoma with a BRAF V600E or V600K mutation, as detected by an FDA-approved test; in combination with cetuximab, for the treatment of adults with metastatic colorectal cancer (CRC) with a BRAF V600E mutation, as detected by an FDA-approved test, after prior therapy; in combination with binimetinib, for the treatment of adults with metastatic non-small cell lung cancer with a BRAF V600E mutation, as detected by an FDA-approved test.

Encorafenib is not indicated for treatment of people with wild-type BRAF melanoma, wild-type BRAF CRC, or wild-type BRAF NSCLC.

In December 2024, the FDA granted accelerated approval to encorafenib with cetuximab and mFOLFOX6 (fluorouracil, leucovorin, and oxaliplatin) for people with metastatic colorectal cancer with a BRAF V600E mutation, as detected by an FDA-approved test.

== Pharmacology ==
Encorafenib acts as an ATP-competitive RAF kinase inhibitor, decreasing ERK phosphorylation and down-regulation of CyclinD1. This arrests the cell cycle in G1 phase, inducing senescence without apoptosis. Therefore, it is only effective in melanomas with a BRAF mutation, which make up 50% of all melanomas. The plasma elimination half-life of encorafenib is approximately 6 hours, occurring mainly through metabolism via cytochrome P450 enzymes.

== History ==
Approval of encorafenib in the United States was based on a randomized, active-controlled, open-label, multicenter trial (COLUMBUS; NCT01909453) in 577 participants with BRAF V600E or V600K mutation-positive unresectable or metastatic melanoma. Participants were randomized (1:1:1) to receive binimetinib 45 mg twice daily plus encorafenib 450 mg once daily, encorafenib 300 mg once daily, or vemurafenib 960 mg twice daily. Treatment continued until disease progression or unacceptable toxicity.

The major efficacy measure was progression-free survival (PFS) using RECIST 1.1 response criteria and assessed by blinded independent central review. The median PFS was 14.9 months for participants receiving binimetinib plus encorafenib, and 7.3 months for the vemurafenib monotherapy arm (hazard ratio 0.54, 95% CI: 0.41, 0.71, p<0.0001). The trial was conducted at 162 sites in Europe, North America, and various countries around the world.

Efficacy for encorafenib with cetuximab and mFOLFOX6 was evaluated in BREAKWATER (NCT04607421), an active-controlled, open-label, multicenter trial. Participants were required to have treatment naïve BRAF V600E mutation-positive metastatic colorectal cancer, detected by the Qiagen therascreen BRAF V600E RGQ polymerase chain reaction kit. Participants were initially randomized 1:1:1 to one of the following treatment arms: encorafenib orally once daily with cetuximab IV infusion every 2 weeks (encorafenib+cetuximab arm); encorafenib orally once daily with cetuximab IV infusion every 2 weeks and mFOLFOX6 every 2 weeks (encorafenib+cetuximab+mFOLFOX6 arm); or mFOLFOX6, FOLFOXIRI (both every 2 weeks) or CAPOX (every 3 weeks)-each with or without bevacizumab (control arm). The trial was subsequently amended to limit randomization (1:1) to the encorafenib +cetuximab+mFOLFOX6 arm and the control arm. Treatment in all arms continued until disease progression, unacceptable toxicity, consent withdrawal, lost to follow-up, or death. The results of the encorafenib + cetuximab + mFOLFOX6 arm compared to the control arm served as the basis of this accelerated approval and are described below.

=== Clinical trials ===
Several clinical trials of LGX818, either alone or in combinations with the MEK inhibitor MEK162, are being run. As a result of a successful Phase Ib/II trials, Phase III trials are currently being initiated.
