= V600E =

Genetic variant

V600E is a mutation of the BRAF gene in which valine (V) is substituted by glutamic acid (E) at amino acid 600. It is a driver mutation in a proportion of certain diagnoses, including melanoma, hairy cell leukemia, papillary thyroid carcinoma, colorectal cancer, non-small-cell lung cancer, Langerhans cell histiocytosis, Erdheim–Chester disease (a non-Langerhans-cell histiocytosis) and ameloblastoma.

The mechanism of the mutation is that the negative charge of the acidic glutamic acid residue causes it to be phosphomimetic. This mimics the phosphorylation of the nearby T599 threonine and S602 serine residues in the activation segment of BRAF, which are used to activate the wild type form of the protein. The glutamate residue of the mutant therefore functions to activate BRAF by inhibiting the interaction of the BRAF's glycine rich loop and activation segment, which would ordinarily be inhibitory. The loss of inhibition of BRAF leads to an increase in its basal activity and hence is oncogenic.

== Clinical ==
Vemurafenib, encorafenib, and dabrafenib are approved by the FDA for treatment of metastatic melanomas that express V600E.
