= Histiocytic neoplasm =

Tumor derived from histiocytes

Histiocytic neoplasms are a rare group of tumors that develop from a class of immune cells called histiocytes, which include macrophages, dendritic cells, and monocytes.
