= MAPK/ERK pathway =

Cell signaling pathway

Key components of the MAPK/ERK pathway. "P" represents phosphate, which communicates the signal. Top, epidermal growth factor (EGF) binds to the EGF receptor (EGFR) in the cell membrane, starting the cascade of signals. Further downstream, phosphate signal activates MAPK (also known as ERK). Bottom, signal enters the cell nucleus and causes transcription of DNA, which is then expressed as protein.

The MAPK/ERK pathway (also known as the Ras-Raf-MEK-ERK pathway) is a chain of proteins in the cell that communicates a signal from a receptor on the surface of the cell to the DNA in the nucleus of the cell.

The signal starts when a signaling molecule binds to the receptor on the cell surface and ends when the DNA in the nucleus expresses a protein and produces some change in the cell, such as cell division. The pathway includes many proteins, such as mitogen-activated protein kinases (MAPKs), originally called extracellular signal-regulated kinases (ERKs), which communicate by adding phosphate groups to a neighboring protein (phosphorylating it), thereby acting as an "on" or "off" switch.

When one of the proteins in the pathway is mutated, it can become stuck in the "on" or "off" position, a necessary step in the development of many cancers. In fact, components of the MAPK/ERK pathway were first discovered in cancer cells, and drugs that reverse the "on" or "off" switch are being investigated as cancer treatments.

== Background ==
The signal that starts the MAPK/ERK pathway is the binding of extracellular mitogen to a cell surface receptor. This allows a Ras protein (a Small GTPase) to swap a GDP molecule for a GTP molecule, flipping the "on/off switch" of the pathway. The Ras protein can then activate MAP3K (e.g., Raf), which activates MAP2K, which activates MAPK. Finally, MAPK can activate a transcription factor, such as Myc. This process is described in more detail below.

=== Ras activation ===
Receptor-linked tyrosine kinases, such as the epidermal growth factor receptor (EGFR), are activated by extracellular ligands, such as the epidermal growth factor (EGF). Binding of EGF to the EGFR activates the tyrosine kinase activity of the cytoplasmic domain of the receptor. The EGFR becomes phosphorylated on tyrosine residues. Docking proteins such as GRB2 contain an SH2 domain that binds to the phosphotyrosine residues of the activated receptor. GRB2 binds to the guanine nucleotide exchange factor SOS by way of the two SH3 domains of GRB2. When the GRB2-SOS complex docks to phosphorylated EGFR, SOS becomes activated. Activated SOS then promotes the removal of GDP from a member of the Ras subfamily (most notably H-Ras or K-Ras). The Ras protein can then bind GTP and become active.

Apart from EGFR, other cell surface receptors that can activate this pathway via GRB2 include Trk A/B, Fibroblast growth factor receptor (FGFR) and PDGFR.

=== Kinase cascade ===
Activated Ras then activates the protein kinase activity of a RAF kinase. The RAF kinase phosphorylates and activates a MAPK/ERK Kinase (MEK1 or MEK2). The MEK phosphorylates and activates a mitogen-activated protein kinase (MAPK).

RAF and MAPK/ERK are both serine/threonine-specific protein kinases. MEK is a serine/tyrosine/threonine kinase.

In a technical sense, RAF, MEK, and MAPK are all mitogen-activated kinases, as is MNK (see below). MAPKs were originally called "extracellular signal-regulated kinases" (ERKs) and "microtubule associated protein kinases" (MAPKs). One of the first proteins known to be phosphorylated by ERK was a microtubule-associated protein (MAP). As discussed below, many additional targets for phosphorylation by MAPK were later found, and the protein was renamed "mitogen-activated protein kinase" (MAPK). The series of kinases from RAF to MEK to MAPK is an example of a protein kinase cascade. Such series of kinases provide opportunities for feedback regulation and signal amplification.

=== Regulation of translation and transcription ===
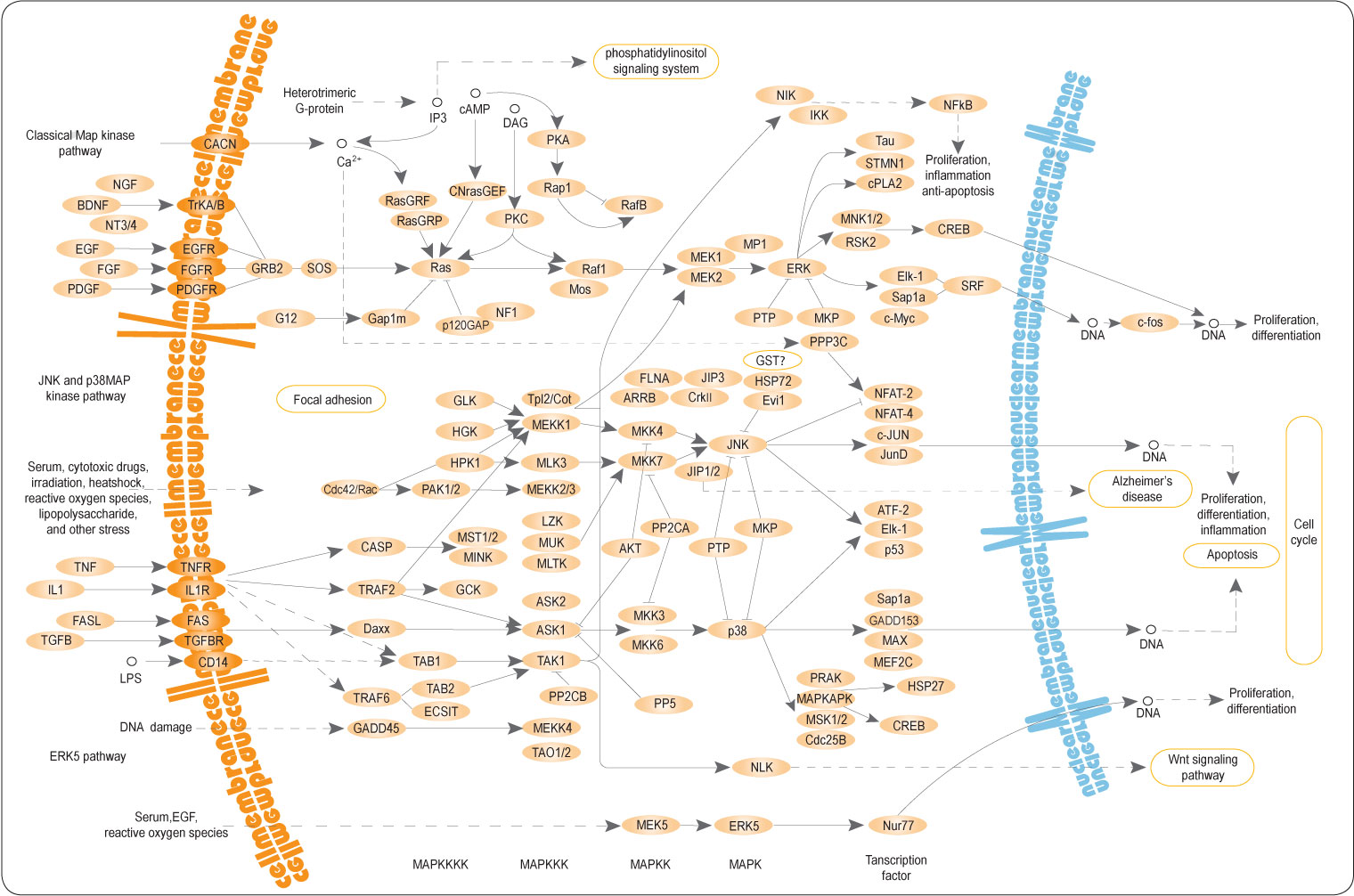
MAP Kinase Pathways.

Three of the many proteins that are phosphorylated by MAPK are shown in the figure to the right. One effect of MAPK activation is to alter the translation of mRNA to proteins. MAPK phosphorylates the 40S ribosomal protein S6 kinase (RSK). This activates RSK, which, in turn, phosphorylates ribosomal protein S6. Mitogen-activated protein kinases that phosphorylate ribosomal protein S6 were the first to be isolated.

MAPK regulates the activities of several transcription factors. MAPK can phosphorylate C-myc. MAPK phosphorylates and activates MNK, which, in turn, phosphorylates CREB. MAPK also regulates the transcription of the C-Fos gene. By altering the levels and activities of transcription factors, MAPK leads to altered transcription of genes that are important for the cell cycle.

The 22q11, 1q42, and 19p13 genes, by affecting the ERK pathway, are associated with schizophrenia, schizoaffective disorder, bipolar disorder, and migraines.

== Regulation of cell cycle entry and proliferation ==
=== Role of mitogen signaling in cell cycle progression ===
The ERK pathway plays an important role of integrating external signals from the presence of mitogens such as epidermal growth factor (EGF) into signaling events promoting cell growth and proliferation in many mammalian cell types. In a simplified model, the presence of mitogens and growth factors trigger the activation of canonical receptor tyrosine kinases such as EGFR leading to their dimerization and subsequent activation of the small GTPase Ras. This then leads to a series of phosphorylation events downstream in the MAPK cascade (Raf-MEK-ERK) ultimately resulting in the phosphorylation and activation of ERK. The phosphorylation of ERK results in an activation of its kinase activity and leads to phosphorylation of its many downstream targets involved in regulation of cell proliferation. In most cells, some form of sustained ERK activity is required for cells to activate genes that induce cell cycle entry and suppress negative regulators of the cell cycle. Two such important targets include Cyclin D complexes with Cdk4 and Cdk6 (Cdk4/6) which are both phosphorylated by ERK. The transition from G1 to S phase is coordinated by the activity of Cyclin D-Cdk4/6, which increases during late G1 phase as cells prepare to enter S-phase in response to mitogens. Cdk4/6 activation contributes to hyper-phosphorylation and the subsequent destabilization of retinoblastoma protein (Rb). Hypo-phosphorylated Rb, is normally bound to transcription factor E2F in early G1 and inhibits its transcriptional activity, preventing expression of S-phase entry genes including Cyclin E, Cyclin A2 and Emi1. ERK1/2 activation downstream of mitogen induced Ras signaling is necessary and sufficient to remove this cell cycle block and allow cells to progress to S-phase in most mammalian cells.

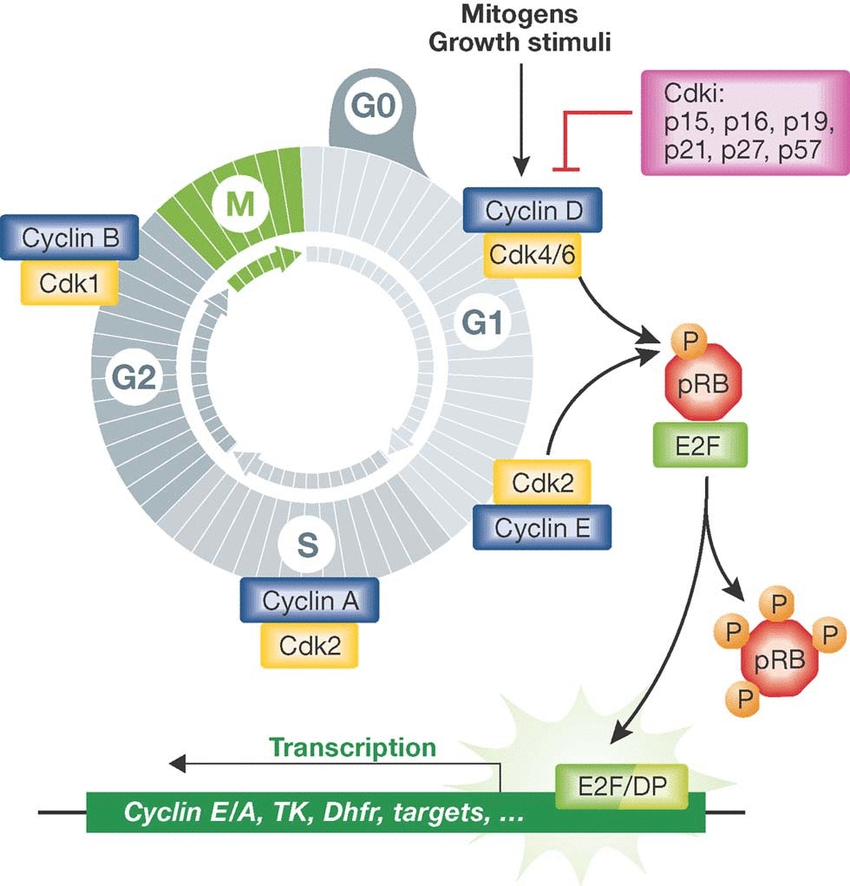
Schematic of mitogen input integrated into the cell cycle

=== Downstream feedback control and generation of a bistable G1/S switch ===
The restriction point (R-point) marks the critical event when a mammalian cell commits to proliferation and becomes independent of growth stimulation. It is fundamental for normal differentiation and tissue homeostasis, and seems to be dysregulated in virtually all cancers. Although the R-point has been linked to various activities involved in the regulation of G1–S transition of the mammalian cell cycle, the underlying mechanism remains unclear. Using single-cell measurements, Yao et al., shows that the Rb–E2F pathway functions as a bistable switch to convert graded serum inputs into all-or-none E2F responses.

Growth and mitogen signals transmitted downstream of the ERK pathway are incorporated into multiple positive feedback loops to generate a bistable switch at the level of E2F activation. This occurs due to three main interactions during late G1 phase. The first is a result of mitogen stimulation through the ERK leading to the expression of the transcription factor Myc, which is a direct activator of E2F. The second pathway is a result of ERK activation leading to the accumulation of active complexes of Cyclin D and Cdk4/6 which destabilize Rb via phosphorylation and further serve to activate E2F and promote expression of its targets. Finally, these interactions are all reinforced by an additional positive feedback loop by E2F on itself, as its own expression leads to production of the active complex of Cyclin E and CDK2, which further serves to lock in a cell's decision to enter S-phase. As a result, when serum concentration is increased in a gradual manner, most mammalian cells respond in a switch-like manner in entering S-phase. This mitogen-stimulated, bistable E2F switch exhibits hysteresis, as cells are inhibited from returning to G1 even after mitogen withdrawal post-E2F activation.

=== Dynamic signal processing by the ERK pathway ===
The EGFR-ERK/MAPK (epidermal growth factor receptor extracellular-regulated kinase/mitogen-activated protein kinase) pathway stimulated by EGF is critical for cellular proliferation, but the temporal separation between signal and response obscures the signal-response relationship in previous research.In 2013, Albeck et al. provided key experimental evidence to fill this gap of knowledge. They measured signal strength and dynamics with steady-state EGF stimulation, in which the signaling and output can be easily related. They further mapped the signal-response relationship across the pathway’s full dynamic range. Using high-content immunofluorescence (HCIF) detection of phosphorylated ERK (pERK) and live cell FRET biosensors, they monitored downstream output of the ERK pathway in both live cells and fixed cells. To further link the quantitative characteristics of ERK signaling to proliferation rates, they established a series of steady-state conditions using a range of EGF concentrations by applying EGF with different concentrations.

Single cell imaging experiments have shown ERK to be activated in stochastic bursts in the presence of EGF. Furthermore, the pathway has been shown to encode the strength of signaling inputs though frequency modulated pulses of its activity. Using live cell FRET biosensors, cells induced with different concentrations of EGF illicit activity bursts of different frequency, where higher levels of EGF resulted in more frequent bursts of ERK activity. To figure out how S phase entry can be affected by sporadic pulses of ERK activity at low EGF concentrations, they used MCF-10A cells co-expressing EKAR-EV and RFP-geminin and identified the pulses of ERK activity with the scoring and then align this ERK activity profiles with time of GFP-geminin induction. They found that longer periods of ERK activity stimulate S phase entry, as suggested by increased pulse length. To understand the dynamics of EGFR-ERK pathway, specifically how is the frequency and amplitude modulated, they applied the EGFR inhibitor gefitinib or the highly selective MAPK/ERK kinase (MEK) inhibitor PD0325901 (PD). Two inhibitors yield actually a little bit different result: gefitinib, at intermediate concentration, would induce pulsatory behavior and also bimodal shift, which is not observed with PD. They further combine EGF and PD together and draw the conclusion that the frequency of ERK activities is modulated by quantitative variation while the amplitude is modulated by MEK activity’s change. Lastly they turned to Fra-1, one of downstream effectors of ERK pathway, as it’s technically challenging to estimate ERK activities directly. To understand how the integrated ERK pathway output (which should be independent of either frequency or amplitude) affect the proliferation rate, they used the combination of a wide range of EGF and PD concentrations and find that there’s actually an inverted “L” shape single curvilinear relationship, which suggests that at low levels of ERK pathway output, small changes in signal intensity correspond to large changes in proliferative rate, while large changes in signal intensity near the high end of the dynamic range have little impact on proliferation. The fluctuation of ERK signaling highlights potential issues with current therapeutic approaches, providing new perspective in terms of thinking about drug targeting in the ERK pathway in cancer.

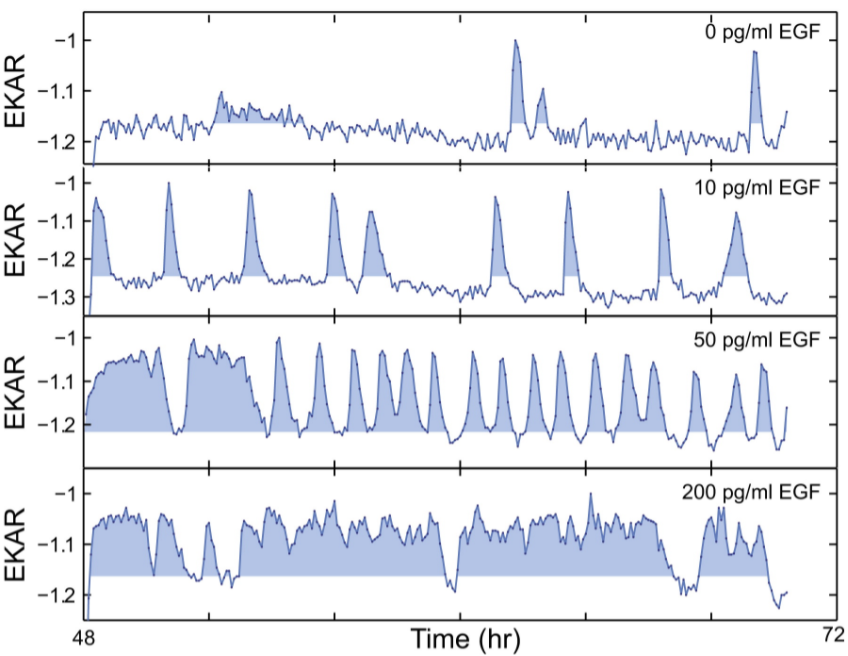
EGF-Stimulated, Frequency-Modulated ERK Activity Pulses

=== Integration of mitogen and stress signals in proliferation ===
Recent live cell imaging experiments in MCF10A and MCF7 cells have shown that a combination of mitogen signaling though ERK and stress signals through activation of p53 in mother cells contributes to the likelihood of whether newly formed daughter cells will immediately re-enter the cell cycle or enter quiescence (G0) preceding mitosis. Rather than daughter cells starting with no key signaling proteins after division, mitogen/ERK induced Cyclin D1 mRNA and DNA damage induced p53 protein, both long lived factors in cells, can be stably inherited from mother cells after cell division. The levels of these regulators vary from cell to cell after mitosis and stoichiometry between them strongly influences cell cycle commitment though activation of Cdk2. Chemical perturbations using inhibitors of ERK signaling or inducers p53 signaling in mother cells suggest daughter cells with high levels of p53 protein and low levels of Cyclin D1 transcripts were shown to primarily enter G0 whereas cells with high Cyclin D1 and low levels of p53 are most likely to reenter the cell cycle. These results illustrate a form of encoded molecular memory though the history of mitogen signaling through ERK and stress response though p53.

== Clinical significance ==
Uncontrolled growth is a necessary step for the development of all cancers. In many cancers (e.g. melanoma), a defect in the MAP/ERK pathway leads to that uncontrolled growth. Many compounds can inhibit steps in the MAP/ERK pathway, and therefore are potential drugs for treating cancer, such as Hodgkin disease.

The first drug licensed to act on this pathway is sorafenib — a Raf kinase inhibitor. Other Raf inhibitors include SB590885, PLX4720, XL281, RAF265, encorafenib, dabrafenib, and vemurafenib.

Some MEK inhibitors include cobimetinib, CI-1040, PD0325901, binimetinib (MEK162), selumetinib, and trametinib (GSK1120212)

It has been found that acupoint-moxibustion has a role in relieving alcohol-induced gastric mucosal injury in a mouse model, which may be closely associated with its effects in up-regulating activities of the epidermal growth factor/ERK signal transduction pathway.

RAF-ERK pathway is also involved in the pathophysiology of Noonan syndrome, a polymalformative disease.

Protein microarray analysis can be used to detect subtle changes in protein activity in signaling pathways. The developmental syndromes caused by germline mutations in genes that alter the RAS components of the MAP/ERK signal transduction pathway are called RASopathies.

== See also ==
- Janus kinase
- Phosphatase
- Signal transducing adaptor protein
- G protein-coupled receptor
