= KSR1 =

Protein-coding gene in the species Homo sapiens

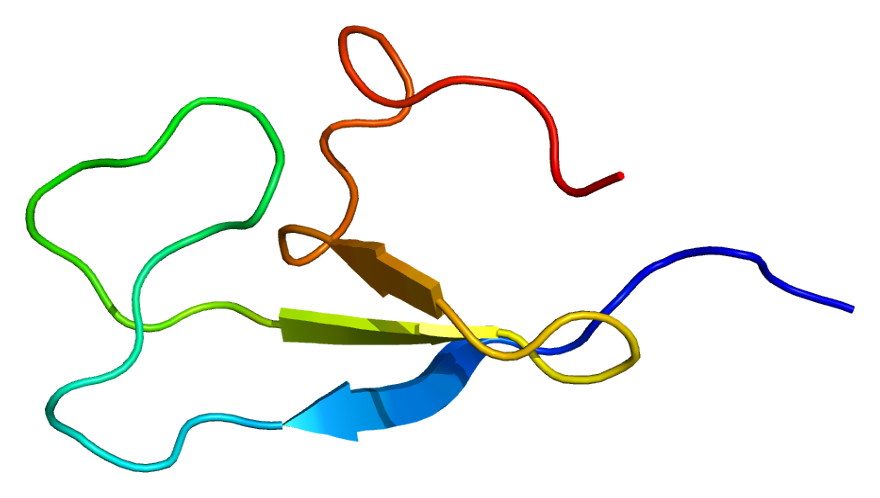

Identifiers
- Aliases: KSR1, KSR, RSU2, kinase suppressor of ras 1
- External IDs: OMIM: 601132; MGI: 105051; GeneCards: KSR1
Available structures
PDB	Ortholog search: PDBe RCSB
PDB	List of PDB id codes 1KBE, 1KBF, 2LPE
Enzyme activity
EC #	BRENDA	ExPASy	KEGG	MetaCyc
2.7.11.1	↗	↗	↗	↗

Gene location (Human)
Chr.	Chromosome 17 (human)
Band	17q11.2	Start	27,456,448 bp
Band	17q11.2	End	27,626,438 bp

Gene location (Mouse)
Chr.	Chromosome 11 (mouse)
Band	11 B5|11 46.74 cM	Start	78,904,266 bp
Band	11 B5|11 46.74 cM	End	79,037,233 bp
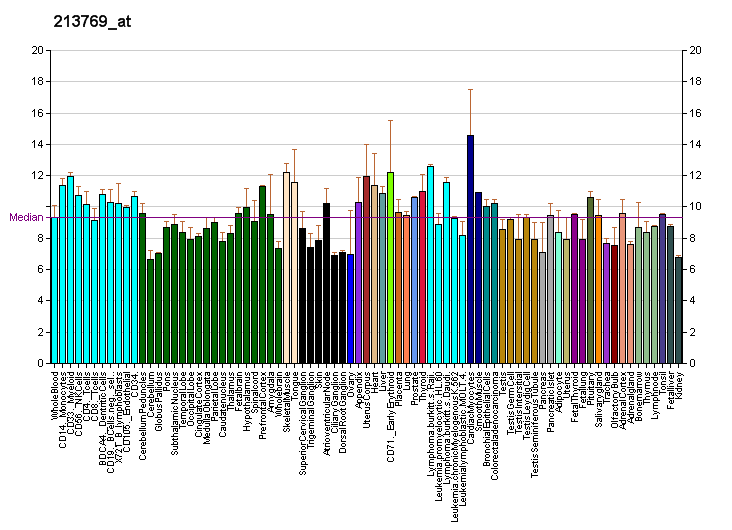

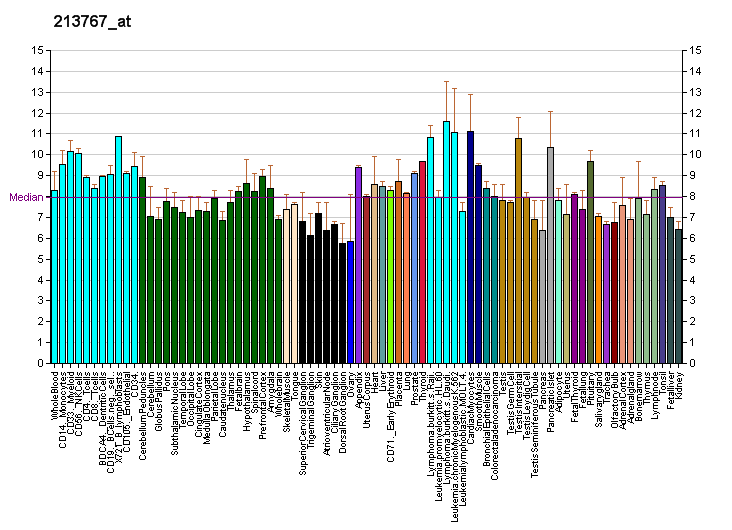
RNA expression pattern
Bgee	Human / Mouse (ortholog); Top expressed in: body of pancreas; sural nerve; oocyte; right lobe of thyroid gland; canal of the cervix; left lobe of thyroid gland; gallbladder; ectocervix; left testis; left ovary / Top expressed in: muscle of thigh; temporal muscle; triceps brachii muscle; dentate gyrus of hippocampal formation granule cell; digastric muscle; medial head of gastrocnemius muscle; sternocleidomastoid muscle; quadriceps femoris muscle; granulocyte; vastus lateralis muscle; More reference expression data
BioGPS	More reference expression data
Gene ontology
Molecular function	metal ion binding; protein C-terminus binding; protein binding; ATP binding; MAP-kinase scaffold activity; protein kinase activity; signal transducer activity; mitogen-activated protein kinase kinase binding; chaperone binding; Hsp90 protein binding; 14-3-3 protein binding
Cellular component	cytoplasm; cytosol; endoplasmic reticulum membrane; membrane; endoplasmic reticulum; cell projection; ruffle membrane; plasma membrane; protein-containing complex
Biological process	intracellular signal transduction; MAPK cascade; cAMP-mediated signaling; protein phosphorylation; Ras protein signal transduction; positive regulation of MAPK cascade; regulation of cell population proliferation; regulation of MAP kinase activity
Sources:Amigo / QuickGO
Orthologs
Databases	NCBI: entry; OMA: entry
Species	Human	Mouse
Entrez	8844	16706
Ensembl	ENSG00000141068	ENSMUSG00000018334
UniProt	Q8IVT5	Q61097
RefSeq (mRNA)	NM_014238; NM_001367810; NM_001394583; NM_001394584; NM_001394585	NM_013571; NM_001348207
RefSeq (protein)	NP_055053; NP_001354739	NP_001335136; NP_038599
Location (UCSC)	Chr 17: 27.46 – 27.63 Mb	Chr 11: 78.9 – 79.04 Mb
PubMed search
- Wikidata
View/Edit Human	View/Edit Mouse

Kinase suppressor of Ras 1 is an enzyme that in humans is encoded by the KSR1 gene.
