= MAP2K2 =

Protein-coding gene in the species Homo sapiens

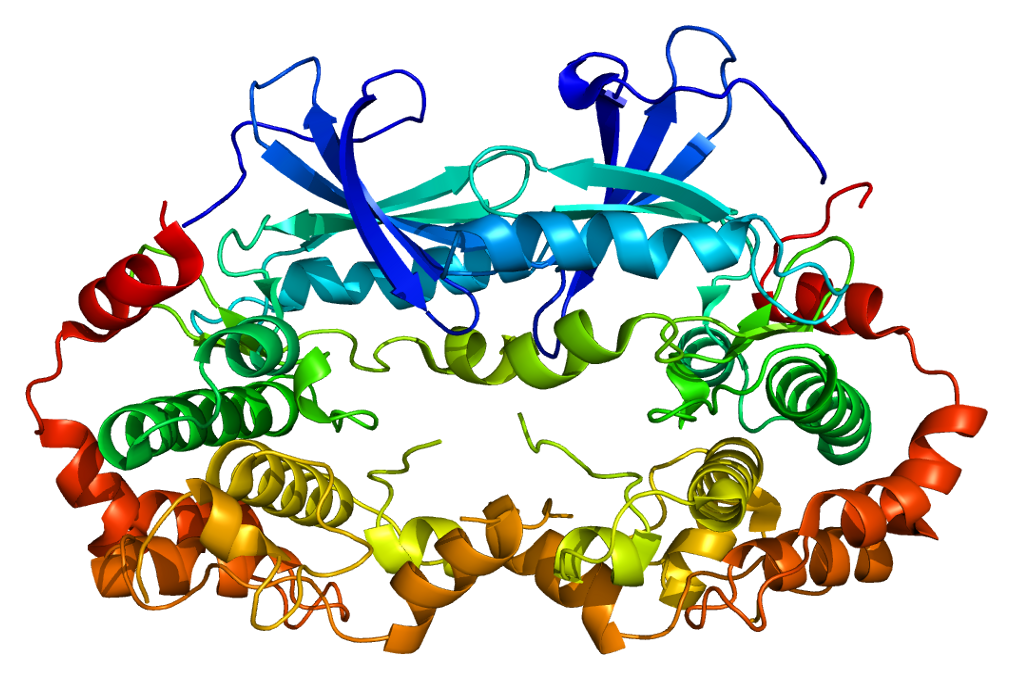

Identifiers
- Aliases: MAP2K2, CFC4, MAPKK2, MEK2, MKK2, PRKMK2, mitogen-activated protein kinase kinase 2
- External IDs: OMIM: 601263; MGI: 1346867; GeneCards: MAP2K2
Available structures
PDB	Ortholog search: PDBe RCSB
PDB	List of PDB id codes 1S9I, 4H3Q
Enzyme activity
EC #	BRENDA	ExPASy	KEGG	MetaCyc
2.7.12.2	↗	↗	↗	↗

Gene location (Human)
Chr.	Chromosome 19 (human)
Band	19p13.3	Start	4,090,321 bp
Band	19p13.3	End	4,124,122 bp

Gene location (Mouse)
Chr.	Chromosome 10 (mouse)
Band	10 C1|10 39.72 cM	Start	80,941,749 bp
Band	10 C1|10 39.72 cM	End	80,969,809 bp
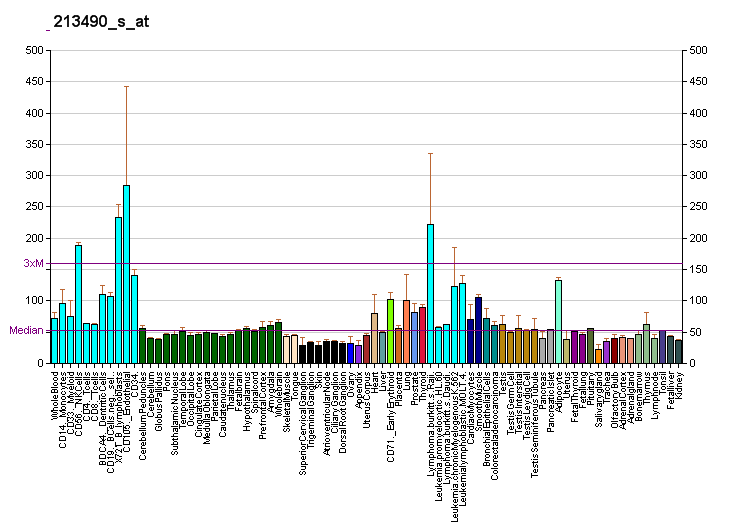

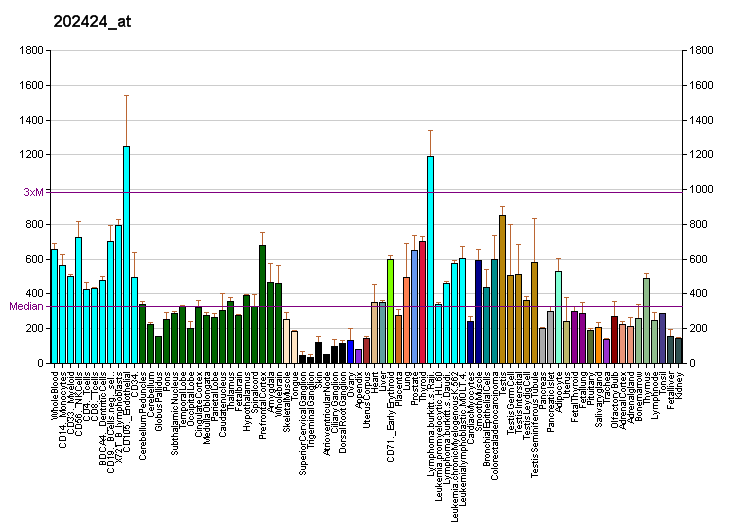
RNA expression pattern
Bgee	Human / Mouse (ortholog); Top expressed in: mucosa of transverse colon; right testis; left testis; apex of heart; muscle of thigh; gastrocnemius muscle; right frontal lobe; anterior pituitary; right hemisphere of cerebellum; prefrontal cortex / Top expressed in: muscle of thigh; lip; right kidney; yolk sac; neural tube; ventricular zone; duodenum; esophagus; superior frontal gyrus; Rostral migratory stream; More reference expression data
BioGPS	More reference expression data
Gene ontology
Molecular function	transferase activity; nucleotide binding; protein kinase activity; PDZ domain binding; scaffold protein binding; protein serine/threonine kinase activator activity; metal ion binding; kinase activity; protein binding; protein serine/threonine/tyrosine kinase activity; protein tyrosine kinase activity; ATP binding; MAP kinase kinase activity; protein serine/threonine kinase activity
Cellular component	late endosome; Golgi apparatus; membrane; focal adhesion; cell-cell junction; peroxisomal membrane; extracellular region; early endosome; endoplasmic reticulum; mitochondrion; perinuclear region of cytoplasm; cytoplasmic side of plasma membrane; microtubule; nucleus; cytoplasm; cytosol; plasma membrane
Biological process	phosphorylation; regulation of early endosome to late endosome transport; peptidyl-serine autophosphorylation; negative regulation of gene expression; positive regulation of protein serine/threonine kinase activity; protein phosphorylation; peptidyl-tyrosine phosphorylation; regulation of Golgi inheritance; regulation of stress-activated MAPK cascade; MAPK cascade; ERK1 and ERK2 cascade; positive regulation of production of miRNAs involved in gene silencing by miRNA; positive regulation of transcription, DNA-templated; positive regulation of ERK1 and ERK2 cascade; regulation of mitotic cell cycle; regulation of apoptotic process; signal transduction; stress-activated protein kinase signaling cascade; activation of protein kinase activity
Sources:Amigo / QuickGO
Orthologs
Databases	NCBI: entry; OMA: entry
Species	Human	Mouse
Entrez	5605	26396
Ensembl	ENSG00000126934	ENSMUSG00000035027
UniProt	P36507	Q63932
RefSeq (mRNA)	NM_030662	NM_023138; NM_001347144; NM_001358539
RefSeq (protein)	NP_109587	NP_001334073; NP_075627; NP_001345468
Location (UCSC)	Chr 19: 4.09 – 4.12 Mb	Chr 10: 80.94 – 80.97 Mb
PubMed search
- Wikidata
View/Edit Human	View/Edit Mouse

Dual specificity mitogen-activated protein kinase kinase 2 is an enzyme that in humans is encoded by the MAP2K2 gene. It is more commonly known as MEK2, but has many alternative names including CFC4, MKK2, MAPKK2 and PRKMK2.

== Function ==
The protein encoded by this gene is a dual specificity protein kinase that belongs to the MAP kinase kinase family. This kinase is known to play a critical role in mitogen growth factor signal transduction. It phosphorylates and thus activates MAPK1/ERK2 and MAPK3/ERK1.

The activation of this kinase itself is dependent on the Ser/Thr phosphorylation by MAP kinase kinase kinases.

The inhibition or degradation of this kinase is found to be involved in the pathogenesis of Yersinia and anthrax.

== Interactions ==
MAP2K2 has been shown to interact with MAPK3 and ARAF.
