= Nectin =

Family of cellular adhesion molecules

Nectin-like receptors

Identifiers
- Symbol: Nectin
- Membranome: 220

Nectins and Nectin-like molecules (Necl) are families of cellular adhesion molecules involved in Ca^{2+}-independent cellular adhesion.

Nectins are ubiquitously expressed and have adhesive roles in a wide range of tissues such as the adherens junction of epithelia or the chemical synapse of the neuronal tissue.

== Diversity ==
So far four nectins have been identified in humans, namely nectin-1, nectin-2, nectin-3 and nectin-4. These four family members have also been found in most other well studied mammals. Also, five Necls have been identified; these are: Necl-1, Necl-2, Necl-3, Necl-4 and Necl-5.

== Structure ==
All nectins and all Necls share the same overall structure defined by three extra cellular immunoglobulin domains, a single transmembrane helix and an intracellular domain. For all nectins the intracellular domain can bind a scaffold protein named afadin (the product of the MLLT4 gene).

All nectins and Necls can form homo-cis dimers, meaning a dimer of two alike molecules on the same cell membrane. Following the homo-dimer formation they can trans-interact in an either heterophilic or homophilic manner. The network of the nectin and Necl trans-interactions has been characterized. Recent structural reports reveal the physical and chemical determinants of homophilic interactions mediated by N-terminal IgV domains. In general, heterophilic interactions among nectins have higher affinity than their respective homophilic interactions.

Nectins and Necls can also recruit cadherins to enhance binding.

== Nomenclature controversy ==
Since the research of nectins has been approached from several angles there is still some controversy about the names of these proteins and the genes encoding them. The idea of grouping these proteins into nectins and Necls originates from Dr. Youhsimi Takai's early studies of the proteins. Nectins and Necls are related in function and protein structure and have been found to interact in a variety of ways, which it is why they are commonly families. However, if one considers the sequence of the genes encoding the proteins, an alternative way of naming the proteins also make sense, as pointed out by Thomas Biederer. Alternative names for nectins and Necls are listed below:

nectin-1 : PVRL1 (Poliovirus receptor-related 1), HveC (herpesvirus entry mediator C), CD111 (Cluster of Differentiation 111)

nectin-2 : PVRL2 (Poliovirus receptor-related 2), HveB (herpesvirus entry mediator B), CD112 (Cluster of Differentiation 112)

nectin-3 : PVRL3 (Poliovirus receptor-related 3), CD113 (Cluster of Differentiation 113)

nectin-4 : PVRL4 (Poliovirus receptor-related 4), LNIR; PRR4; EDSS1

necl-1 : CADM3 (Cell adhesion molecule 3), TSLL1 (TSLC1-like 1), SynCAM3 (Synaptic cell adhesion molecule 3), IGSF4B (Immunoglobulin super family member 4B)

necl-2 : CADM1 (Cell adhesion molecule 1), TSLC1 (Tumor suppressor in lung cancer 1), SynCAM1 (Synaptic cell adhesion molecule 1), IGSF4 (Immunoglobulin super family member 4), sgIGSF (Spermatogenic immunoglobulin superfamily), RA175

necl-3 : SynCAM2 (Synaptic cell adhesion molecule 2)

necl-4 : TSLL2 (TSLC1-like 2), SynCAM4 (Synaptic cell adhesion molecule 1)

necl-5 : Tage4, PVR (Poliovirus receptor), CD155

== Clinical relevance ==
Nectin-1 and nectin-3 have been shown to be involved in cellular adhesion in some neuronal synapses. Unlike many other cellular adhesion molecules they do not distribute evenly on axonal and dendritic side of the synapse. Instead, Nectin-1 is primarily found on the axonal side and nectin-3 primarily on the dendritic side. Nectin-1 serves as the entry receptor for Herpes Simplex Viruses 1 and 2, binding to the viral envelope glycoprotein gD, and for Pseudorabies Virus.

Nectin-4 can be found in the serum of patients with lung cancer. This has led to speculation that this protein might be involved in some developing cancers and might have a pharmaceutical potential.

Also, necl-2 is down regulated in a variety of cancers. This is why necl-2 is also known as Tumor suppressor in lung cancer 1 (TSLC1).

=== As a drug target ===
Nectin-4 : Enfortumab vedotin-ejfv was approved by the FDA in 2019; it is a Nectin-4-directed antibody drug conjugate that has shown clinical activity in metastatic urothelial cancer.
