= LIMD1 =

Protein-coding gene in the species Homo sapiens

Identifiers
- Aliases: LIMD1, LIM domains containing 1, LIM domain containing 1
- External IDs: OMIM: 604543; MGI: 1352502; GeneCards: LIMD1

Gene location (Human)
| Chr. | Chromosome 3 (human) |
| Band | 3p21.31 | Start | 45,555,394 bp |
| Band | 3p21.31 | End | 45,686,341 bp |

Gene location (Mouse)
| Chr. | Chromosome 9 (mouse) |
| Band | 9 F4|9 74.0 cM | Start | 123,307,771 bp |
| Band | 9 F4|9 74.0 cM | End | 123,350,617 bp |
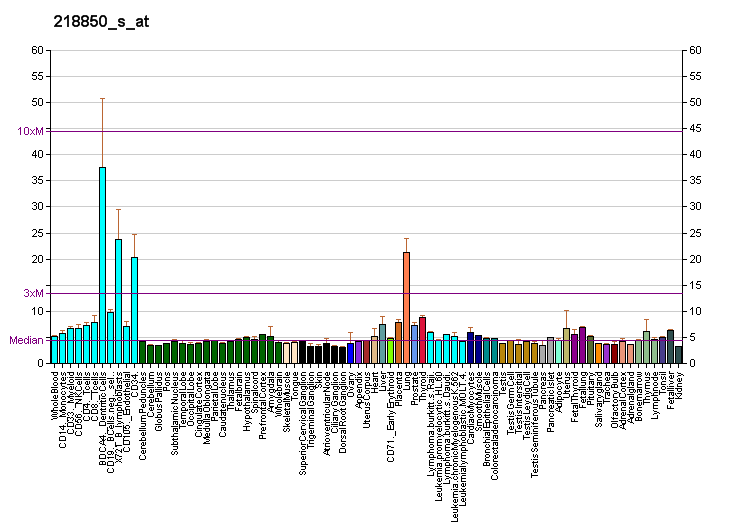
RNA expression pattern
| Bgee | Human / Mouse (ortholog); Top expressed in: lower lobe of lung; mucosa of paranasal sinus; superficial temporal artery; retinal pigment epithelium; visceral pleura; synovial joint; pylorus; oral cavity; germinal epithelium; superior surface of tongue / Top expressed in: saccule; otic placode; otic vesicle; medullary collecting duct; triceps brachii muscle; spermatid; temporal muscle; decidua; mesenteric lymph nodes; internal carotid artery; More reference expression data |
| BioGPS | More reference expression data |
Gene ontology
| Molecular function | metal ion binding; protein binding; transcription corepressor activity; zinc ion binding |
| Cellular component | cytoplasm; RISC complex; focal adhesion; adherens junction; P-body; cell junction; nucleus; transcription regulator complex; cytosol; plasma membrane; cell-cell junction |
| Biological process | response to hypoxia; regulation of transcription, DNA-templated; phosphorylation; negative regulation of osteoblast differentiation; transcription, DNA-templated; positive regulation of gene silencing by miRNA; multicellular organism development; negative regulation of hippo signaling; gene silencing by miRNA; cytoskeleton organization; P-body assembly; regulation of cell shape; osteoblast development; gene silencing; negative regulation of transcription, DNA-templated; cell migration; negative regulation of canonical Wnt signaling pathway; signal transduction; regulation of transcription from RNA polymerase II promoter in response to hypoxia |
Sources:Amigo / QuickGO
Orthologs
| Databases | NCBI: entry; OMA: entry |
| Species | Human | Mouse |
| Entrez | 8994 | 29806 |
| Ensembl | ENSG00000144791 | ENSMUSG00000025239 |
| UniProt | Q9UGP4 | Q9QXD8 |
| RefSeq (mRNA) | NM_014240 | NM_013860 |
| RefSeq (protein) | NP_055055 | NP_038888 |
| Location (UCSC) | Chr 3: 45.56 – 45.69 Mb | Chr 9: 123.31 – 123.35 Mb |
| PubMed search |
- Wikidata
| View/Edit Human | View/Edit Mouse |

LIM domain-containing protein 1 is a protein that in humans is encoded by the LIMD1 gene. This Ajuba family protein acts a adaptor/scaffold that is involved in assembling a number of protein complexes. It forms a complex with TRAF6, PRKCZ and SQSTM1.
