= Ajuba =

Ajuba (also Ajooba) is an Urdu or Hindi word that means curiosity. It may refer to:

- AJUBA, a gene found in humans that encodes the Ajuba protein
- Ajooba, a 1991 Bollywood film
