= Nectin-3 =

Mammalian protein found in Homo sapiens

NECTIN3

Identifiers
- Aliases: NECTIN3, CD113, CDW113, NECTIN-3, PPR3, PRR3, PVRR3, PVRL3, nectin cell adhesion molecule 3
- External IDs: OMIM: 607147; MGI: 1930171; GeneCards: NECTIN3
Available structures
PDB	Ortholog search: PDBe RCSB
PDB	List of PDB id codes 4FOM

Gene location (Human)
Chr.	Chromosome 3 (human)
Band	3q13.13	Start	111,070,071 bp
Band	3q13.13	End	111,275,563 bp

Gene location (Mouse)
Chr.	Chromosome 16 (mouse)
Band	16|16 B5	Start	46,208,069 bp
Band	16|16 B5	End	46,318,888 bp
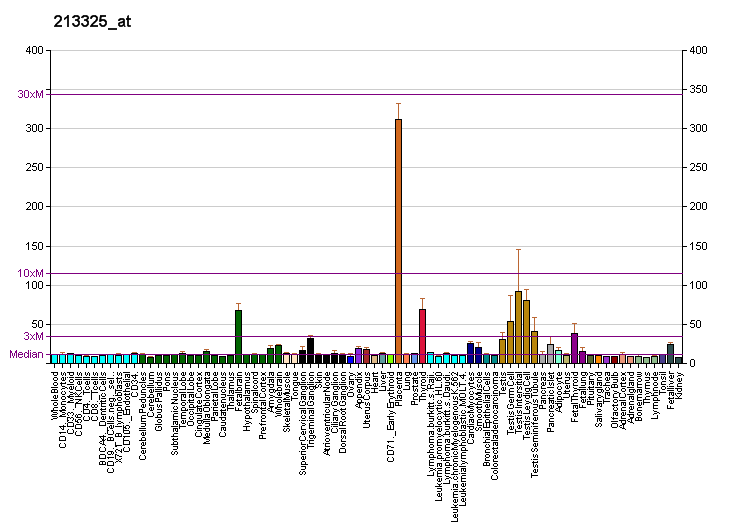
RNA expression pattern
Bgee	Human / Mouse (ortholog); Top expressed in: stromal cell of endometrium; sperm; Achilles tendon; islet of Langerhans; placenta; left testis; rectum; right testis; jejunal mucosa; duodenum / Top expressed in: seminiferous tubule; spermatid; spermatocyte; ciliary body; iris; epithelium of lens; lumbar spinal ganglion; left lung lobe; molar; right lung lobe; More reference expression data
BioGPS	More reference expression data
Gene ontology
Molecular function	protein homodimerization activity; protein binding; signaling receptor binding; cell adhesion molecule binding; identical protein binding; signaling receptor activity
Cellular component	integral component of membrane; postsynaptic membrane; membrane; cell-cell junction; plasma membrane; synapse; integral component of plasma membrane; cell junction; apical junction complex; cell-cell contact zone; hippocampal mossy fiber to CA3 synapse; integral component of postsynaptic density membrane; axon; dendrite
Biological process	heterophilic cell-cell adhesion via plasma membrane cell adhesion molecules; cell recognition; retina morphogenesis in camera-type eye; cell adhesion; lens morphogenesis in camera-type eye; fertilization; adherens junction organization; homophilic cell adhesion via plasma membrane adhesion molecules; spermatid development; protein localization to cell junction; cell-cell adhesion; establishment of protein localization to plasma membrane
Sources:Amigo / QuickGO
Orthologs
Databases	NCBI: entry; OMA: entry
Species	Human	Mouse
Entrez	25945	58998
Ensembl	ENSG00000177707	ENSMUSG00000022656
UniProt	Q9NQS3	Q9JLB9
RefSeq (mRNA)	NM_001243286; NM_001243288; NM_015480	NM_021495; NM_021496; NM_021497
RefSeq (protein)	NP_001230215; NP_001230217; NP_056295	NP_067470; NP_067471; NP_067472
Location (UCSC)	Chr 3: 111.07 – 111.28 Mb	Chr 16: 46.21 – 46.32 Mb
PubMed search
- Wikidata
View/Edit Human	View/Edit Mouse

Nectin-3, also known as nectin cell adhesion molecule 3, is a protein that in humans is encoded by the NECTIN3 gene.

Nectin-3 belongs to the family of immunoglobulin(Ig)-like cellular adhesion molecules involved in Ca^{2+}-independent cellular adhesion in several tissues during the development and was firstly isolated at the turn of 20th and 21st century.

== Structure and localization ==
Nectin-3 has three splicing variants, nectin-3α, which is the biggest one, nectin-3β and the smallest variant nectin-3γ.

Nectin-3α (same as the other splicing variants) is abundately expressed in testis, on slightly lower level it is also expressed in heart, brain, liver or kidney. It has been also proved that nectin-3α is together with nectin-2 localize at the junctional complex regions in small intestina absorptive epithelia. Nectin-3γ is also detectable in lung, liver and kidney. Nectin-3 is expressed not only on epithelial cells as another nectins, but there was shown that, as the only member of nectin family, it is expressed also on T- lymphocytes.

The structural properties of nectin-3α is similar to nectin-1, it has three Ig-like domains at the extracellular region and the C-terminal conserved motif at the cytoplasmic region. The homology of aa (amino aci)) of extracellular domains between Nectin-1 and Nectin-3α is 35,9%. Another splicing variants vary in the number of aa, molecular weight and the structural properties. All of them have the identical extracellular region. Nectin-3β and nectin-3γ have the same transmembrane and cytoplasmic regions, which vary from nectin-3α. Nectin-3γ lack of C-terminal domain. With the intracellular domain nectins bind their assosicated adaptor protein afadin which plays role in the formation of variety of cell-cell junctions. Nectin-3γ in not able to bind afadin due to lacking C-terminal domain.

All nectins are able to form cis-homo dimer interactions, which simply means they can create dimer of two alike molecules on the same cell membrane. Further, nectin-3α can also interact with Nectin-1/2α in so called trans-hetero interaction.

== Function ==
Most of the publications deal with nectin-3 regardless the splicing variants, thus this page follows this concept.

=== Role in neural system ===
Nectin-3 is expressed by granule cells in dentate gyrus and the expression levels are developmentally regulated and reduced by early postnatal stress. On mice model, it has been shown that the early-life stress impaires the long-term spatial memory and temporal order memory. It is also very probable that the nectin-3 in dentate gyrus neurons modulate adult neurogenesis and dendritic spine plasticity. It has been proven that combination nectin-3/nectin-1 is very important in formation of synapses in brain, hippocampus and that the formation of hetero-trans-dimers between nectin-1 and nectin-3 determines the position and size of the synapses, in vitro. In vivo, it has been shown that the function of nectin-3 is crutial during the critical periods of the visual cortex development and that it is important not only for synapses formation but also for the synaptic refinement. Also it has been proven that there is a high importance of nectin-3 for the dendritic spine densities (which simply represent the sites of synaptic contacts) on visual cortical neurons. The nectin-1/nectin-3 trans-interaction has been shown to be very important to establishing the adhesion between the pigment and non-pigment cell layers of the ciliary epithelia, which is essential for the morphogenesis of the ciliary body of the eye.

=== Role in gametogenesis ===
Nectin-3 is important role player in spermatid development. The nectin-3^{–/–} male mice were found to have defects in the later steps of sperm morphogenesis, exhibiting distorted nuclei and abnormal distribution of mitochondria. The loss of nectin-3 in male mice leads to male-specific infertility. It has been shown that the chronic stress negatively influences the amount of nectin-3 in the testis and also the male spermatogenesis function.

=== Role in transendothelial migration ===
As mentioned above, nectin-3 is the only nectin which is expressed on T- lymphocytes. The interaction between nectin-3 on T-cells and other nectins on epithelial cells is very important in the lymphocyte transendothelial migration, in vitro. It has been shown that this process is dependent on nectin-2, which is expressed on epithelial cells, the blockation of nectin-2 or nectin-3 leads to inhibition of lymphocyte and also monocyte extravasation.

== Nectin-3 in cancer ==
Nectin-3 is highly expressed in epithelial cancer cells of human lung adenocarcinoma. It is expressed in 80% of patients which makes it relatively strong prognostic marker. It has been shown, there are various expression patterns of nectin-3; cytoplasmic, membranous or combined. The membranous expression is connected with significantly poorer prognosis, patients with this type of expression pattern are also more likely to earlier relapse and death. Increased amounts of nectin-3 are also detectable in ovaries during the ovarian cancer and are correlated with poor patient prognosis. The data also suggest that the possible mechanism of nectin-3 in cellular invasion and migration is by upregulating the expression of matrix metalloproteinases (MMPs) MMP2 and MMP9 in ovarian cancer.

Contrary to previously mentioned cancers, the amount of nectin-3 negatively correlates with Pancreatic neuroendocrine tumors. The loss of this protein correlates with increased tumor progressiveness.

== Interactions ==
Nectin-3 has been shown to interact with:

- MLLT4,
- PARD3,
- PTPRM.
