= PTPN3 =

Protein-coding gene in the species Homo sapiens

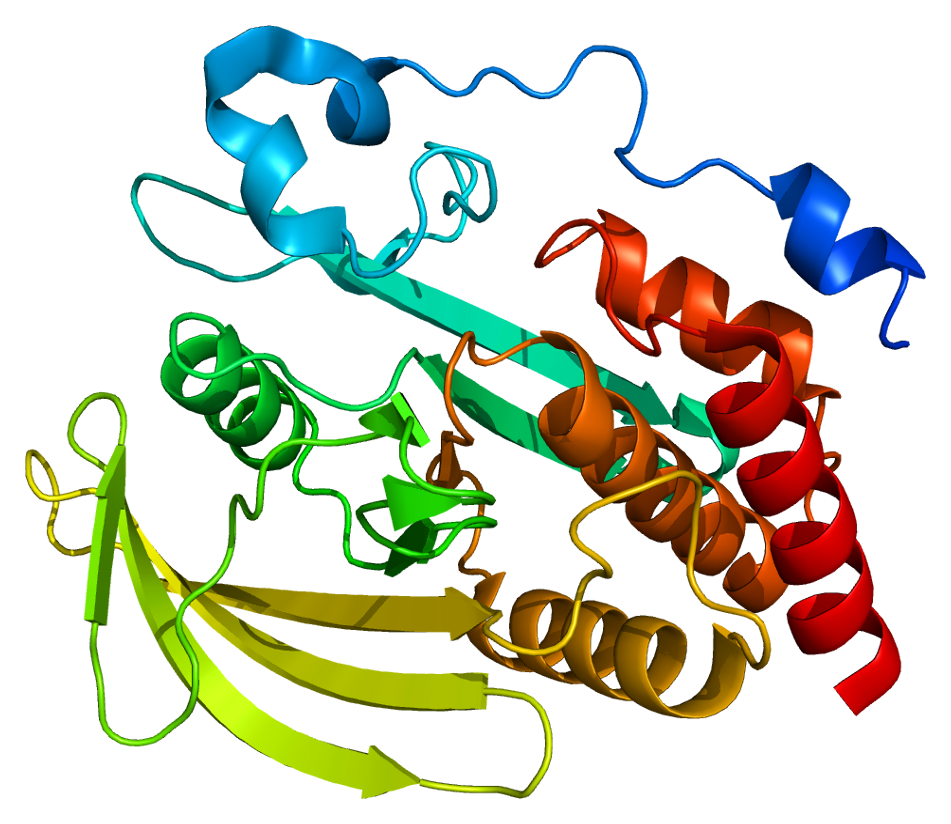

Identifiers
- Aliases: PTPN3, PTP-H1, PTPH1, protein tyrosine phosphatase, non-receptor type 3, protein tyrosine phosphatase non-receptor type 3
- External IDs: OMIM: 176877; MGI: 105307; GeneCards: PTPN3
Available structures
PDB	Ortholog search: PDBe RCSB
PDB	List of PDB id codes 2B49, 4QUM, 4QUN, 4RH5, 4RH9, 4RHG, 4RI4, 4RI5, 4S0G
Enzyme activity
EC #	BRENDA	ExPASy	KEGG	MetaCyc
3.1.3.48	↗	↗	↗	↗

Gene location (Human)
Chr.	Chromosome 9 (human)
Band	9q31.3	Start	109,375,466 bp
Band	9q31.3	End	109,498,313 bp

Gene location (Mouse)
Chr.	Chromosome 4 (mouse)
Band	4 B3|4 31.66 cM	Start	57,190,841 bp
Band	4 B3|4 31.66 cM	End	57,301,837 bp
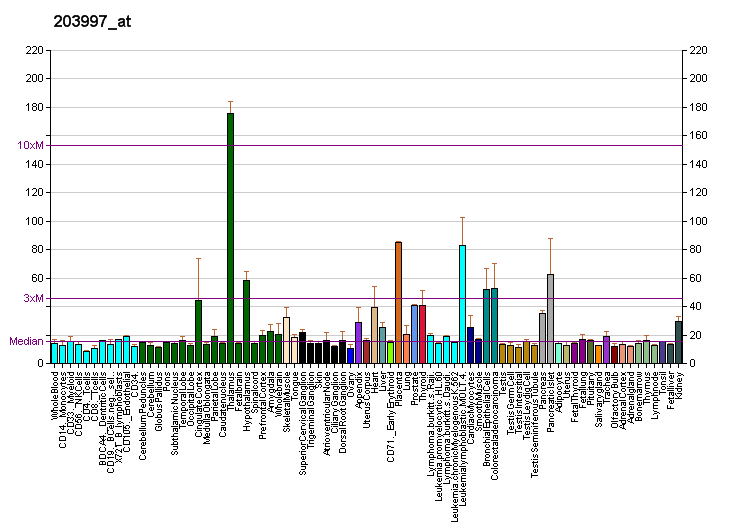
RNA expression pattern
Bgee	Human / Mouse (ortholog); Top expressed in: oocyte; Skeletal muscle tissue of rectus abdominis; secondary oocyte; triceps brachii muscle; glutes; muscle of thigh; thoracic diaphragm; lateral nuclear group of thalamus; gastrocnemius muscle; biceps brachii / Top expressed in: medial dorsal nucleus; medial geniculate nucleus; lateral geniculate nucleus; trigeminal ganglion; ankle; otolith organ; utricle; soleus muscle; tibialis anterior muscle; olfactory system; More reference expression data
BioGPS	More reference expression data
Gene ontology
Molecular function	sodium channel regulator activity; phosphoprotein phosphatase activity; phosphatase activity; phosphotyrosine residue binding; ATPase binding; cytoskeletal protein binding; protein binding; protein tyrosine phosphatase activity; hydrolase activity
Cellular component	cytoplasm; membrane; cytoplasmic side of plasma membrane; cytoskeleton; plasma membrane
Biological process	regulation of membrane depolarization during action potential; protein dephosphorylation; liver regeneration; regulation of sodium ion transmembrane transporter activity; negative regulation of membrane protein ectodomain proteolysis; negative regulation of mitotic cell cycle; dephosphorylation; peptidyl-tyrosine dephosphorylation; negative regulation of epidermal growth factor receptor signaling pathway
Sources:Amigo / QuickGO
Orthologs
Databases	NCBI: entry; OMA: entry
Species	Human	Mouse
Entrez	5774	545622
Ensembl	ENSG00000070159	ENSMUSG00000038764
UniProt	P26045	A2ALK8
RefSeq (mRNA)	NM_001145368; NM_001145369; NM_001145370; NM_001145371; NM_001145372 NM_002829	NM_011207; NM_001384115
RefSeq (protein)	NP_001138840; NP_001138841; NP_001138842; NP_001138843; NP_001138844 NP_002820	NP_035337; NP_001371044
Location (UCSC)	Chr 9: 109.38 – 109.5 Mb	Chr 4: 57.19 – 57.3 Mb
PubMed search
- Wikidata
View/Edit Human	View/Edit Mouse

Tyrosine-protein phosphatase non-receptor type 3 is an enzyme that in humans is encoded by the PTPN3 gene.

== Function ==
The protein encoded by this gene is a member of the protein tyrosine phosphatase (PTP) family. PTPs are known to be signaling molecules that regulate a variety of cellular processes including cell growth, differentiation, mitotic cycle, and oncogenic transformation. This protein contains a C-terminal PTP domain and an N-terminal domain homologous to the band 4.1 superfamily of cytoskeletal-associated proteins. P97, a cell cycle regulator involved in a variety of membrane related functions, has been shown to be a substrate of this PTP. This PTP was also found to interact with, and be regulated by adaptor protein 14-3-3 beta.

== Interactions ==
PTPN3 has been shown to interact with YWHAB.
