= RAP1GAP =

Protein-coding gene in humans

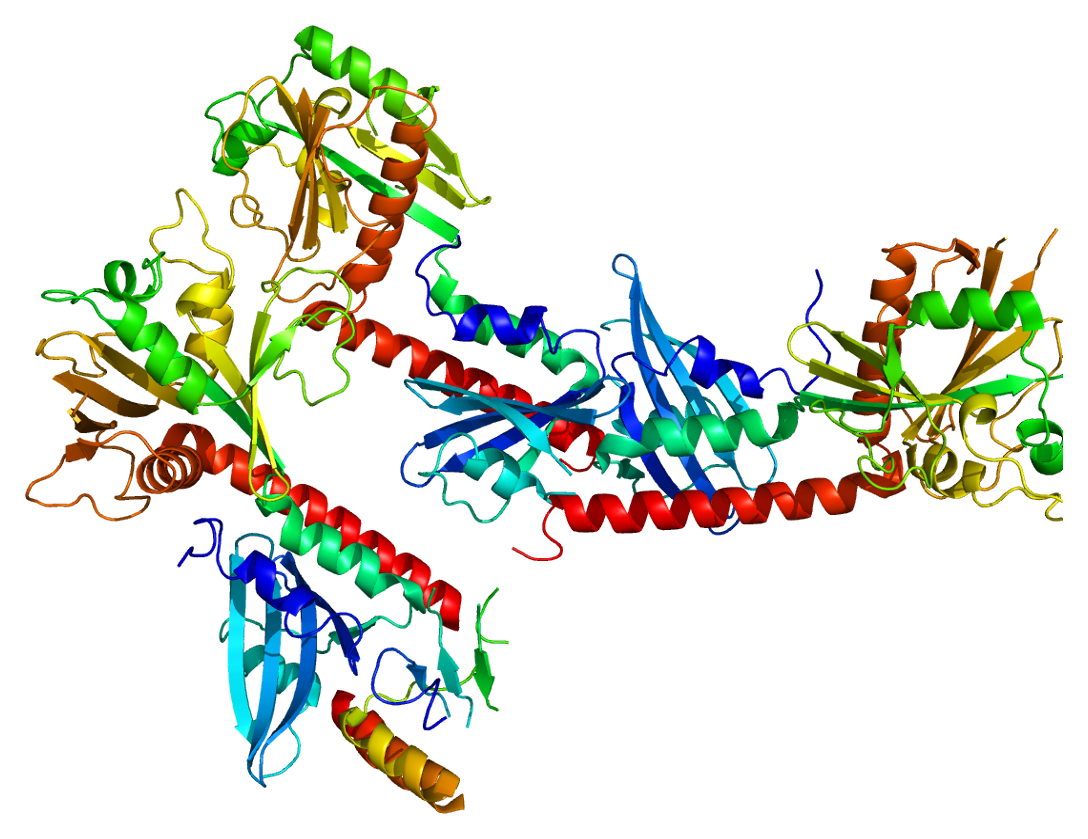

Identifiers
- Aliases: RAP1GAP, RAP1GA1, RAP1GAP1, RAP1GAPII, RAPGAP, RAP1 GTPase activating protein
- External IDs: OMIM: 600278; MGI: 109338; GeneCards: RAP1GAP
Available structures
PDB	Ortholog search: PDBe RCSB
PDB	List of PDB id codes 1SRQ, 3BRW

Gene location (Human)
Chr.	Chromosome 1 (human)
Band	1p36.12	Start	21,596,215 bp
Band	1p36.12	End	21,669,363 bp

Gene location (Mouse)
Chr.	Chromosome 4 (mouse)
Band	4 D3|4 70.02 cM	Start	137,664,726 bp
Band	4 D3|4 70.02 cM	End	137,729,861 bp
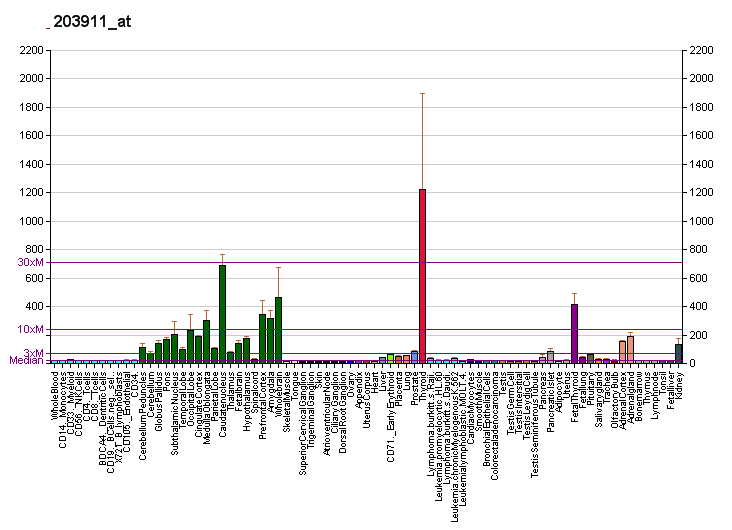
RNA expression pattern
Bgee	Human / Mouse (ortholog); Top expressed in: renal medulla; left lobe of thyroid gland; nucleus accumbens; right lobe of thyroid gland; parotid gland; putamen; caudate nucleus; middle frontal gyrus; right frontal lobe; external globus pallidus / Top expressed in: superior frontal gyrus; habenula; primary visual cortex; nucleus accumbens; nucleus of stria terminalis; perirhinal cortex; olfactory tubercle; entorhinal cortex; parotid gland; central gray substance of midbrain; More reference expression data
BioGPS	More reference expression data
Gene ontology
Molecular function	protein homodimerization activity; GTPase regulator activity; protein binding; GTPase activity; GTPase activator activity
Cellular component	Golgi apparatus; membrane; Golgi membrane; cytosol
Biological process	negative regulation of microvillus assembly; regulation of GTPase activity; positive regulation of GTPase activity; regulation of small GTPase mediated signal transduction; signal transduction; axon guidance
Sources:Amigo / QuickGO
Orthologs
Databases	NCBI: entry; OMA: entry
Species	Human	Mouse
Entrez	5909	110351
Ensembl	ENSG00000076864	ENSMUSG00000041351
UniProt	P47736	A2ALS5
RefSeq (mRNA)	NM_001145657; NM_001145658; NM_002885; NM_001330383; NM_001350524 NM_001350525; NM_001350526; NM_001350527; NM_001350528	NM_001081155; NM_001256218; NM_029563; NM_001331215
RefSeq (protein)	NP_001139129; NP_001139130; NP_001317312; NP_002876; NP_001337453 NP_001337454; NP_001337455; NP_001337456; NP_001337457	NP_001074624; NP_001243147; NP_001318144; NP_083839; NP_001366162 NP_001366163; NP_001366164; NP_001366165
Location (UCSC)	Chr 1: 21.6 – 21.67 Mb	Chr 4: 137.66 – 137.73 Mb
PubMed search
- Wikidata
View/Edit Human	View/Edit Mouse

Rap1 GTPase-activating protein 1 is an enzyme that in humans is encoded by the RAP1GAP gene.

== Interactions ==
RAP1GAP has been shown to interact with MLLT4.
