= YWHAB =

Protein-coding gene in the species Homo sapiens

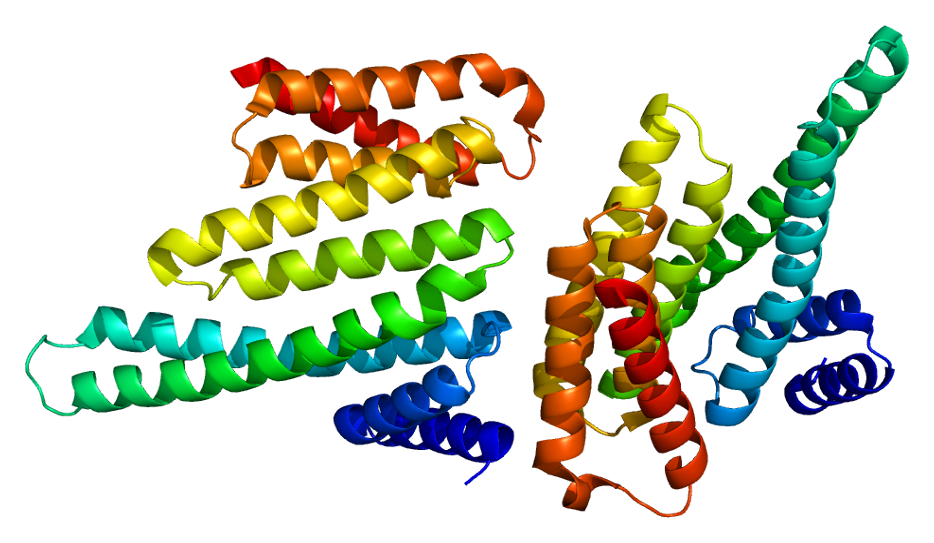
Available structures
PDB	Ortholog search: PDBe RCSB
PDB	List of PDB id codes 2BQ0, 2C23, 4DNK

Identifiers
- Aliases: YWHAB, GW128, HEL-S-1, HS1, KCIP-1, YWHAA, tyrosine 3-monooxygenase/tryptophan 5-monooxygenase activation protein beta
- External IDs: OMIM: 601289; MGI: 1891917; HomoloGene: 20724; GeneCards: YWHAB; OMA:YWHAB - orthologs

Gene location (Human)
Chr.	Chromosome 20 (human)
Band	20q13.12	Start	44,885,702 bp
Band	20q13.12	End	44,908,532 bp

Gene location (Mouse)
Chr.	Chromosome 2 (mouse)
Band	2|2 H3	Start	163,836,880 bp
Band	2|2 H3	End	163,860,508 bp
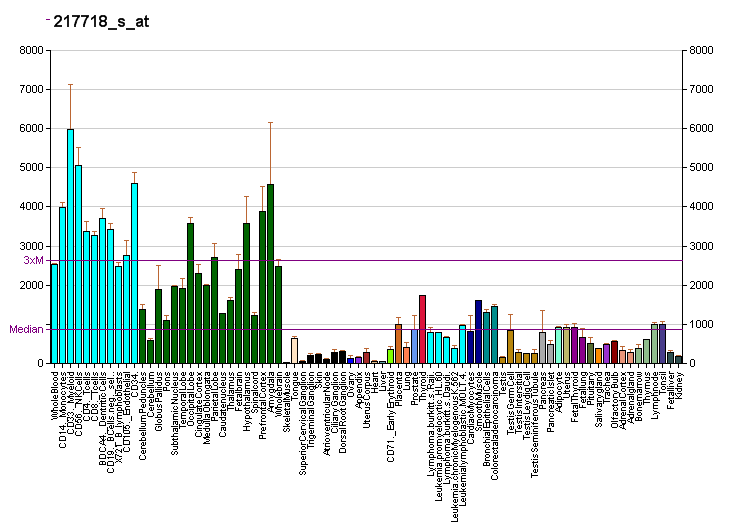

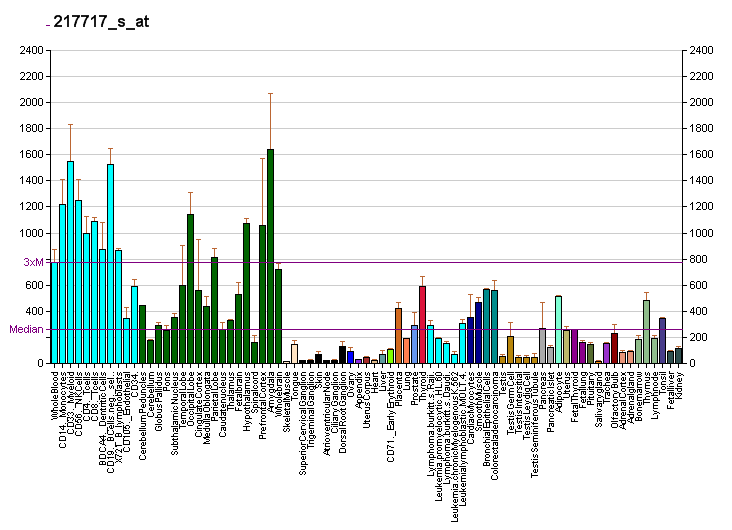

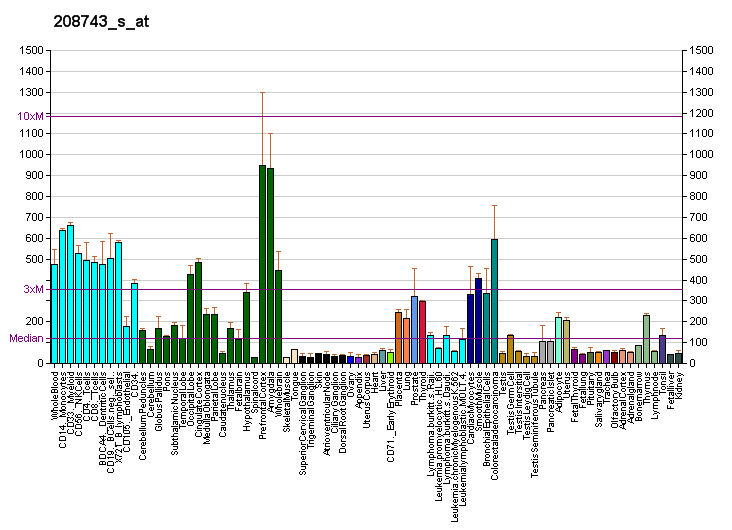
RNA expression pattern
Bgee	Human / Mouse (ortholog); Top expressed in: endothelial cell; Brodmann area 23; middle temporal gyrus; lateral nuclear group of thalamus; entorhinal cortex; parietal lobe; postcentral gyrus; pons; pars compacta; superior frontal gyrus / Top expressed in: substantia nigra; ventromedial nucleus; external carotid artery; internal carotid artery; motor neuron; saccule; facial motor nucleus; barrel cortex; anterior amygdaloid area; dorsomedial hypothalamic nucleus; More reference expression data
BioGPS	More reference expression data
Gene ontology
Molecular function	transcription corepressor activity; protein domain specific binding; protein-containing complex binding; histone deacetylase binding; phosphoprotein binding; protein C-terminus binding; protein binding; enzyme binding; phosphoserine residue binding; cadherin binding; identical protein binding
Cellular component	cytoplasm; membrane; focal adhesion; melanosome; transcription repressor complex; perinuclear region of cytoplasm; extracellular exosome; cytoplasmic vesicle membrane; nucleus; mitochondrion; cytosol; protein-containing complex; vacuole; vacuolar membrane
Biological process	protein targeting; negative regulation of protein dephosphorylation; protein heterooligomerization; regulation of mRNA stability; positive regulation of catalytic activity; hippo signaling; cytoplasmic sequestering of protein; MAPK cascade; positive regulation of protein insertion into mitochondrial membrane involved in apoptotic signaling pathway; membrane organization; viral process; negative regulation of transcription, DNA-templated; negative regulation of G protein-coupled receptor signaling pathway
Sources:Amigo / QuickGO
Orthologs
Species	Human	Mouse
Entrez	7529	54401
Ensembl	ENSG00000166913	ENSMUSG00000018326
UniProt	P31946; Q4VY19	Q9CQV8
RefSeq (mRNA)	NM_139323; NM_003404	NM_018753
RefSeq (protein)	NP_003395; NP_647539	NP_061223
Location (UCSC)	Chr 20: 44.89 – 44.91 Mb	Chr 2: 163.84 – 163.86 Mb
PubMed search
- Wikidata
View/Edit Human	View/Edit Mouse

14-3-3 protein beta/alpha is a protein that in humans is encoded by the YWHAB gene.

== Function ==
This gene encodes a protein belonging to the 14-3-3 family of proteins, members of which mediate signal transduction by binding to phosphoserine-containing proteins. This highly conserved protein family is found in both plants and mammals. The encoded protein has been shown to interact with RAF1 and CDC25 phosphatases, suggesting that it may play a role in linking mitogenic signaling and the cell cycle machinery. Two transcript variants, which encode the same protein, have been identified for this gene.

== Interactions ==
YWHAB has been shown to interact with:

- BRAF,
- C-Raf,
- CD29,
- CDC25A,
- CDC25B,
- Cbl gene,
- EPB41L3,
- HDAC4
- KCNK3,
- MAPK7,
- PTPN3,
- PRKCZ,
- RPS6KA1,
- TESK1,
- TNFAIP3, and
- WEE1.

== See also ==
- 14-3-3 proteins
