= STIL =

Protein-coding gene in humans

Identifiers
- Aliases: STIL, MCPH7, SIL, SCL/TAL1 interrupting locus, centriolar assembly protein, STIL centriolar assembly protein
- External IDs: OMIM: 181590; MGI: 107477; GeneCards: STIL
Available structures
PDB	Ortholog search: PDBe RCSB
PDB	List of PDB id codes 4YYP

Gene location (Human)
Chr.	Chromosome 1 (human)
Band	1p33	Start	47,250,139 bp
Band	1p33	End	47,314,892 bp

Gene location (Mouse)
Chr.	Chromosome 4 (mouse)
Band	4|4 D1	Start	114,857,356 bp
Band	4|4 D1	End	114,900,393 bp
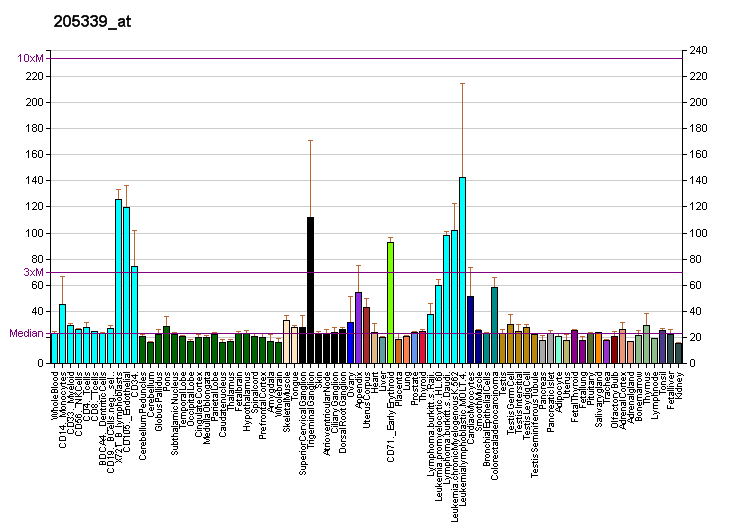
RNA expression pattern
Bgee	Human / Mouse (ortholog); Top expressed in: secondary oocyte; gonad; trabecular bone; ventricular zone; embryo; epithelium of nasopharynx; testicle; amniotic fluid; bone marrow; gingival epithelium / Top expressed in: genital tubercle; tail of embryo; epithelium of lens; maxillary prominence; mandibular prominence; spermatocyte; Gonadal ridge; ventricular zone; seminiferous tubule; medial ganglionic eminence; More reference expression data
BioGPS	More reference expression data
Gene ontology
Molecular function	protein binding; identical protein binding
Cellular component	cytoplasm; cytosol; centrosome; centriole; cytoskeleton
Biological process	centrosome duplication; multicellular organism growth; mitotic spindle organization; notochord development; embryonic axis specification; negative regulation of apoptotic process; in utero embryonic development; floor plate development; multicellular organism development; heart looping; neural tube closure; determination of left/right symmetry; neural tube development; protein localization to centrosome; smoothened signaling pathway; forebrain development; cell population proliferation; regulation of centriole replication
Sources:Amigo / QuickGO
Orthologs
Databases	NCBI: entry; OMA: entry
Species	Human	Mouse
Entrez	6491	20460
Ensembl	ENSG00000123473	ENSMUSG00000028718
UniProt	Q15468; Q7Z626	Q60988
RefSeq (mRNA)	NM_001048166; NM_001282936; NM_001282937; NM_001282938; NM_001282939 NM_003035; NM_001377417	NM_009185; NM_001304551; NM_001304553; NM_001304555; NM_001304559
RefSeq (protein)	NP_001041631; NP_001269865; NP_001269866; NP_001269867; NP_001269868 NP_003026; NP_001364346; NP_001269866.1; NP_001269868.1	NP_001291480; NP_001291482; NP_001291484; NP_001291488; NP_033211
Location (UCSC)	Chr 1: 47.25 – 47.31 Mb	Chr 4: 114.86 – 114.9 Mb
PubMed search
- Wikidata
View/Edit Human	View/Edit Mouse

SCL-interrupting locus protein is a protein that in humans is encoded by the STIL gene. STIL is present in many different cell types and is essential for centriole biogenesis. This gene encodes a cytoplasmic protein implicated in regulation of the mitotic spindle checkpoint, a regulatory pathway that monitors chromosome segregation during cell division to ensure the proper distribution of chromosomes to daughter cells. The protein is phosphorylated in mitosis and in response to activation of the spindle checkpoint, and disappears when cells transition to G1 phase. It interacts with a mitotic regulator, and its expression is required to efficiently activate the spindle checkpoint.

It is proposed to regulate Cdc2 kinase activity during spindle checkpoint arrest. Chromosomal deletions that fuse this gene and the adjacent locus commonly occur in T cell leukemias, and are thought to arise through illegitimate recombination events. Multiple transcript variants encoding different isoforms have been found for this gene. Multiple types of cancer produce STIL, and its expression is linked to an increased mitotic index and cancer development. Hedgehog family-mediated signaling events are one of its associated pathways. The development and function of the nervous system are impacted by STIL. The sequence of STIL gene is highly conserved in vertebrate species .Both fetal and adult tissues express the STIL gene. Its expression levels fluctuate with the cell cycle, making it challenging to detect in a complete tissue, particularly if the cells are not synchronized.

== Gene location ==
The human STIL gene is located on the (p) arm of chromosome 1. It mapped the STIL gene to chromosome 1p33 based on an alignment of the STIL sequence with the genomic sequence. STIL gene contains 20 exons, including alternatively spliced exons 13A and 13B and 18A and 18B. The coding region begins in exon 3. The human SIL gene encodes a 1287-amino acid cytosolic protein.

== Functions and mechanism ==
Numerous cancer types are affected by STIL overexpression which has been linked to chromosomal instability. It plays a part in neural development and function. STIL plays a crucial role in cell mitosis and centriole replication. The early stages of the cell cycle see a slow increase in STIL expression, a peak in the middle, and a sharp decline in the latter stages. When cellular proliferation is inhibited by serum deprivation, contact inhibition, or the promotion of terminal differentiation, STIL is expressed in the proliferating cells and is down-regulated. STIL has been interacted with CDK1, PLK4, and SAS-6. STIL has a role in the Sonic hedgehog (Shh) pathway. STIL regulates the transcription of Shh-target gene Gli1 .The suppressor-of-fused homolog (SUFU) and GLI1 are examples of conserved Shh signaling elements with which the C terminus of STIL can engage. The activation of Shh-GLI1 cascades is caused by STIL's interaction with SUFU, which prevents SUFU from acting as a repressor of GLI1.

Normally, GLI1 binds to the cytoplasmic protein SUFU to form heterodimers. The transcription of the Gli1 gene is blocked because the heterodimers cannot be translocated to nucleus. The binding of SUFU by STIL during STIL expression releases GLI1 from SUFU repression. Gene transcription can then begin as GLI1 enters the nucleus. The transcription of Gli1 cannot begin if STIL is altered. Normally, STIL to bind SUFU, relieve SUFU's inhibition of GLI1, and then allow GLI1 to go to the nucleus for gene transcription. The inability of the SUFU-GLI1 heterodimers prevents the completion of Shh downstream signaling transduction when STIL is mutated.

== Role of STIL in cancer ==
Numerous malignancies have been identified to have STIL disorders, which have fueled carcinogenesis. Copy number variation, mutation, and DNA methylation all had an impact on STIL's dysregulated expression. The expression of STIL was inversely linked with numerous ciliogenesis-related genes. The equilibrium of STIL expression is crucial for the development of primary cilia. STIL silencing might facilitate the development of primary cilia and prevent the production of cell cycle-related proteins. There are no primary cilia when STIL expression is completely lost. Increased cancer metastatic potential is linked to STIL overexpression. STIL has associated with various cancers including lung cancer, colon cancer, pancreatic cancer, prostate adenocarcinoma, and ovarian cancer. The production of mitotic spindles, as well as SHH signaling and the operation of its interactors, are all likely impacted by STIL overexpression, which is linked to a high histopathological mitotic index in tumors. Overexpression of STIL may function as oncogenes and cause cancer by encouraging spindle abnormalities. Spindle orientation control is lost due to disordered mitotic spindles caused by STIL downregulation. This may lead to a reduction in the number of cortical progenitors by cell death or premature differentiation. PLK4 overexpression also causes centrosome amplification and aneuploidy, which reduce brain volume as a result of cell death . Apoptosis inhibition in this setting results in an accumulation of aneuploid cells that are unable to proliferate effectively, causing premature neural differentiation, whereas PLK4 overexpression in environment induces skin cancer.

As a PLK4 downstream effector, STIL may possibly indirectly affect cancer. Malignancies such juvenile medulloblastoma, breast tumors, and colorectal cancer have all been linked to elevated PLK4 expression. Multiple organs develop spontaneous tumors as a result of PLK4 overexpression. It is unclear if STIL expression is necessary for this trait. PLK4 remodels the cytoskeleton and may be important for cancer invasion and metastasis because STIL binds to PLK4 in the cytoplasm. As a result, STIL expression levels may have an impact on PLK4 cytoplasmic activity. PLK4 depletion is associated with an increase in E-cadherin expression and a reduction in metastasis.

In addition to these conditions, CYCLIN B is frequently elevated in primary breast cancer, esophageal squamous cell carcinoma, laryngeal squamous cell carcinoma, and colorectal carcinoma. Downregulation of STIL inhibits tumor growth in vivo by lowering CDK1/CYCLIN B activity, delaying G2-M transition, and preventing G2-M transition. While elevating STIL might encourage CDK1/CYCLIN B activity and unintentionally contribute to CYCLIN B-dependent proliferation in tumor cells. The absence of STIL also causes an increase of Chfr and a decrease in PLK1, which activates the CDC25c phosphatase. Thus, this route may be able to regulate cell division independent of its essential function in centriole duplication.

== Role of STIL in neural development ==
The pattern of STIL expression during the fetal stages supports the link between this gene and cell proliferation. At 15 postconceptional weeks, STIL is more strongly expressed in the ganglionic eminence, the rostral migratory stream, the ventricular and sub ventricular zones of the forebrain. While it is less expressed in the intermediate zone, sub plate, cortical plate, marginal zone, and sub granular layer. The manifestation of this pattern is still present at 21 postconceptional weeks, but it is less prominent in the sub ventricular region.

Although the expression of SAS-6 and STIL differs in some areas of the cortical plate, PLK4, SAS-6, and CPAP also often exhibit this pattern of expression. The exterior granule layer and areas of the rhombic lip of the cerebellum express STIL, PLK4, and SAS-6 but not CPAP. However, none of these genes are expressed in the migratory streams of the hindbrain, the ventricular matrix zone of the cerebellum, or the transitory Purkinje cell cluster.

When the head circumference is less than the age-specific and gender-adjusted mean by more than two standard deviations (S.D.s) at birth, microcephaly (small brain size) is inferred. Primary microcephaly is the term used to describe genetic microcephalies that can be seen in pregnancy. The majority of them, known as microcephalic dwarfism, are autosomal recessive and include I solitary variants known as Microcephaly Primary Hereditary (MCPH), and (ii) types linked to growth retardation. A MCPH phenotype is linked to the majority of STIL mutations found in patients, and STIL is known as MCPH7. Both an increase and a decrease in STIL protein levels during the cell cycle have an impact on centriole control and cause microcephaly.
