= SSX2IP =

Protein-coding gene in humans

Identifiers
- Aliases: SSX2IP, ADIP, synovial sarcoma, X breakpoint 2 interacting protein, SSX family member 2 interacting protein, hMsd1
- External IDs: OMIM: 608690; MGI: 2139150; GeneCards: SSX2IP
Available structures
PDB	Ortholog search: PDBe RCSB
PDB	List of PDB id codes 1T2M, 1XZ9, 2AIN, 2EXG

Gene location (Human)
Chr.	Chromosome 1 (human)
Band	1p22.3	Start	84,643,706 bp
Band	1p22.3	End	84,690,803 bp

Gene location (Mouse)
Chr.	Chromosome 3 (mouse)
Band	3|3 H2	Start	146,110,397 bp
Band	3|3 H2	End	146,145,899 bp
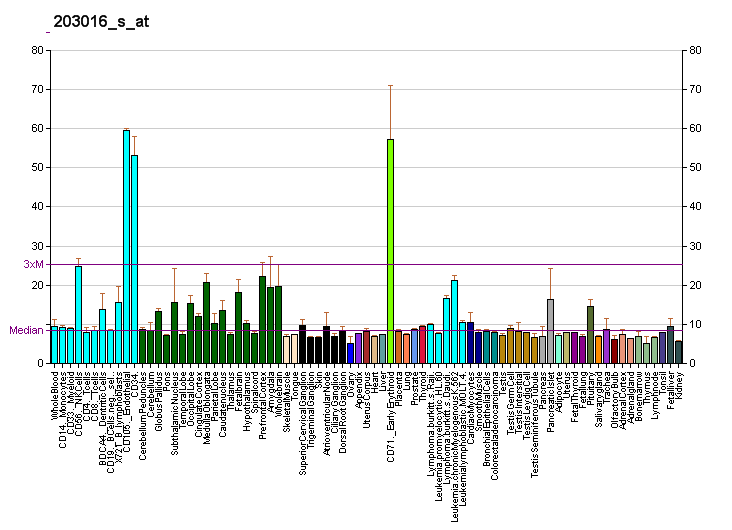

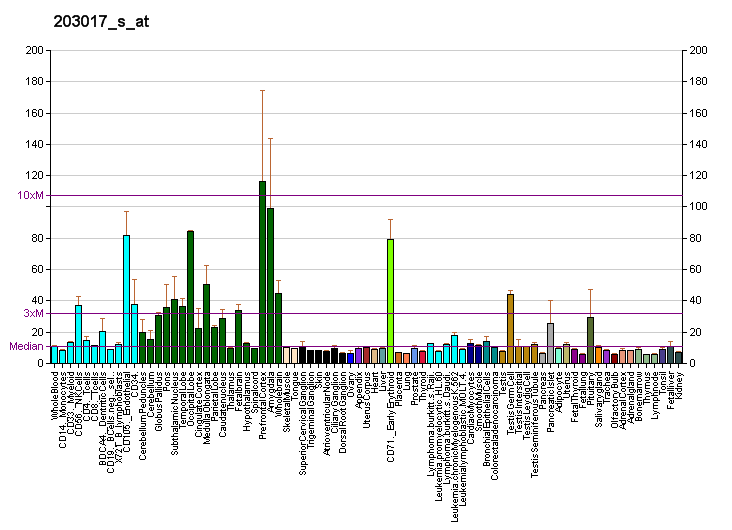

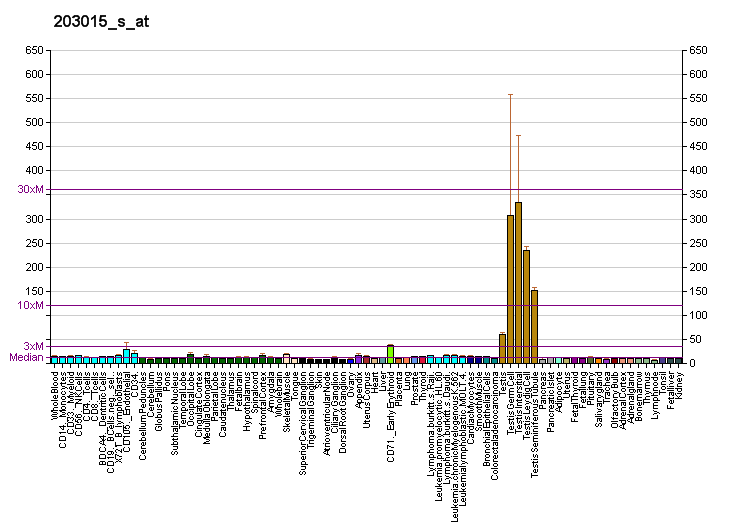
RNA expression pattern
Bgee	Human / Mouse (ortholog); Top expressed in: left testis; right testis; middle temporal gyrus; sperm; Brodmann area 23; jejunal mucosa; Brodmann area 46; endothelial cell; duodenum; secondary oocyte / Top expressed in: Ileal epithelium; seminiferous tubule; spermatid; olfactory epithelium; lens; spermatocyte; fetal liver hematopoietic progenitor cell; CA3 field; retinal pigment epithelium; entorhinal cortex; More reference expression data
BioGPS	More reference expression data
Gene ontology
Molecular function	protein binding; protein domain specific binding
Cellular component	cytoplasm; microtubule organizing center; adherens junction; cell junction; cell projection; cytoskeleton; cell leading edge; nucleus; ciliary basal body; centriolar satellite; protein-containing complex
Biological process	regulation of cell motility; intraciliary transport involved in cilium assembly; regulation of Rac protein signal transduction; cell adhesion; cell projection organization; cilium assembly; centrosome cycle
Sources:Amigo / QuickGO
Orthologs
Databases	NCBI: entry; OMA: entry
Species	Human	Mouse
Entrez	117178	99167
Ensembl	ENSG00000117155	ENSMUSG00000036825
UniProt	Q9Y2D8	Q8VC66
RefSeq (mRNA)	NM_001166293; NM_001166294; NM_001166295; NM_001166417; NM_014021	NM_001253768; NM_001253769; NM_001253770; NM_138744; NM_001355661
RefSeq (protein)	NP_001159765; NP_001159766; NP_001159767; NP_001159889; NP_054740	NP_001240697; NP_001240698; NP_001240699; NP_620083; NP_001342590
Location (UCSC)	Chr 1: 84.64 – 84.69 Mb	Chr 3: 146.11 – 146.15 Mb
PubMed search
- Wikidata
View/Edit Human	View/Edit Mouse

Afadin- and alpha-actinin-binding protein is a protein that in humans is encoded by the SSX2IP gene. It has been shown that it functions together with WDR8 in centrosome maturation, ensuring proper spindle length and orientation. The SSX2IP-WDR8 complex additionally promotes ciliary vesicle docking during ciliogenesis.

== Interactions ==
SSX2IP has been initially described as a protein to interact with MLLT4 and Actinin, alpha 1. In the context of centrosome maturation and ciliogenesis it has been shown to interact with WDR8.
