= Cell adhesion molecule 1 =

Protein involved in attachment of cells

CADM1

Identifiers
- Aliases: CADM1, BL2, IGSF4, IGSF4A, NECL2, Necl-2, RA175, ST17, SYNCAM, TSLC1, sTSLC-1, sgIGSF, synCAM1, cell adhesion molecule 1
- External IDs: OMIM: 605686; MGI: 1889272; GeneCards: CADM1
Available structures
PDB	Ortholog search: PDBe RCSB
PDB	List of PDB id codes 3BIN, 4H5S

Gene location (Human)
Chr.	Chromosome 11 (human)
Band	11q23.3	Start	115,169,218 bp
Band	11q23.3	End	115,504,957 bp

Gene location (Mouse)
Chr.	Chromosome 9 (mouse)
Band	9|9 A5.3	Start	47,530,173 bp
Band	9|9 A5.3	End	47,858,115 bp
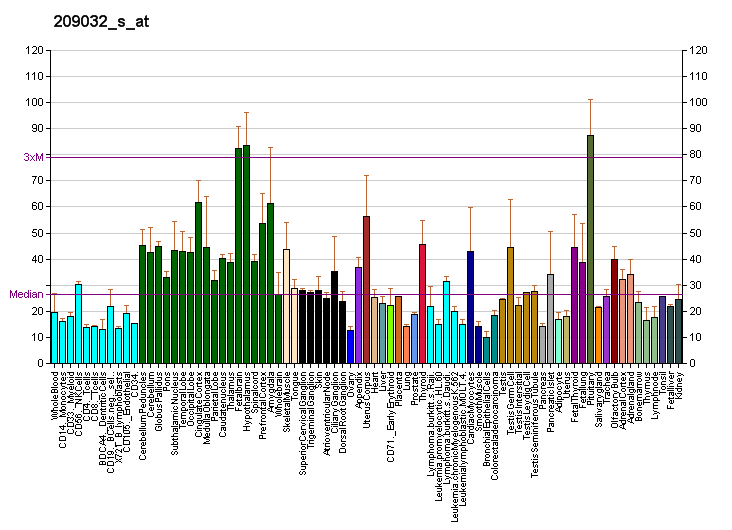

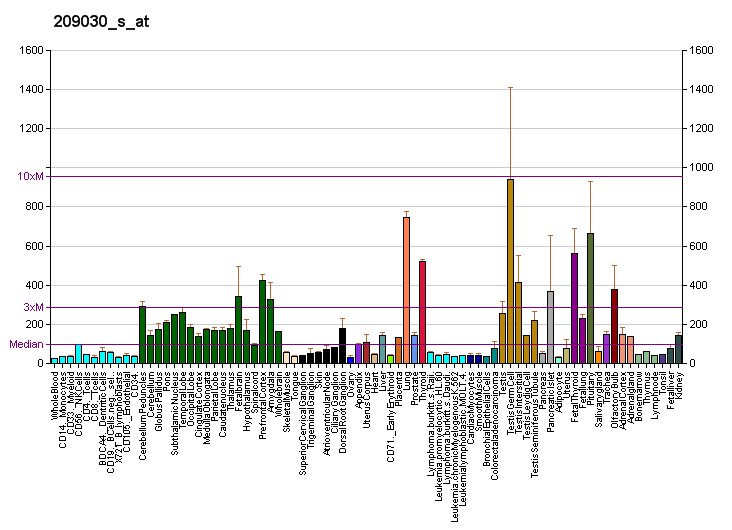
RNA expression pattern
Bgee	Human / Mouse (ortholog); Top expressed in: paraflocculus of cerebellum; pons; periodontal fiber; Achilles tendon; caput epididymis; corpus callosum; visceral pleura; islet of Langerhans; spinal ganglia; beta cell / Top expressed in: epithelium of lens; otic placode; ciliary body; subiculum; otic vesicle; iris; CA3 field; saccule; neural layer of retina; amygdala; More reference expression data
BioGPS	More reference expression data
Gene ontology
Molecular function	PDZ domain binding; protein homodimerization activity; protein binding; signaling receptor binding; cell adhesion molecule binding
Cellular component	integral component of membrane; membrane; cell-cell junction; synapse; integral component of plasma membrane; cell junction; basolateral plasma membrane; plasma membrane
Biological process	cell differentiation; heterophilic cell-cell adhesion via plasma membrane cell adhesion molecules; activated T cell proliferation; immune system process; multicellular organism development; cell adhesion; spermatogenesis; adherens junction organization; T cell mediated cytotoxicity; homophilic cell adhesion via plasma membrane adhesion molecules; apoptotic process; susceptibility to natural killer cell mediated cytotoxicity; positive regulation of natural killer cell mediated cytotoxicity; detection of stimulus; cell recognition; viral process
Sources:Amigo / QuickGO
Orthologs
Databases	NCBI: entry; OMA: entry
Species	Human	Mouse
Entrez	23705	54725
Ensembl	ENSG00000182985	ENSMUSG00000032076
UniProt	Q9BY67	Q8R5M8
RefSeq (mRNA)	NM_001098517; NM_001301043; NM_001301044; NM_001301045; NM_014333	NM_001025600; NM_018770; NM_207675; NM_207676; NM_001310841
RefSeq (protein)	NP_001091987; NP_001287972; NP_001287973; NP_001287974; NP_055148	NP_001020771; NP_001297770; NP_061240; NP_997558; NP_997559
Location (UCSC)	Chr 11: 115.17 – 115.5 Mb	Chr 9: 47.53 – 47.86 Mb
PubMed search
- Wikidata
View/Edit Human	View/Edit Mouse

Cell adhesion molecule 1 is a protein that, in humans, is encoded by the CADM1 gene.

== Interactions ==
Cell adhesion molecule 1 has been shown to interact with EPB41L3.

== Association studies ==
Genome-wide association studies identified an association between body mass index and two loci near the CADM1 and CADM2 gene. Experimental results of another study showed that obese mice had an over expression of both CADM1 and CADM2 genes, and that loss of CADM1 protected mice from obesity, promoting a negative energy balance and weight loss. Furthermore, a 2019 GWAS study revealed an association between Anorexia nervosa and CADM1. In the brain, this genes mediate synaptic assembly, and mutations in CADM1 are also associated with Autistic spectrum disorder.

== See also ==
- Cell adhesion molecule
- Nectin
