= YWHAG =

Protein-coding gene in the species Homo sapiens

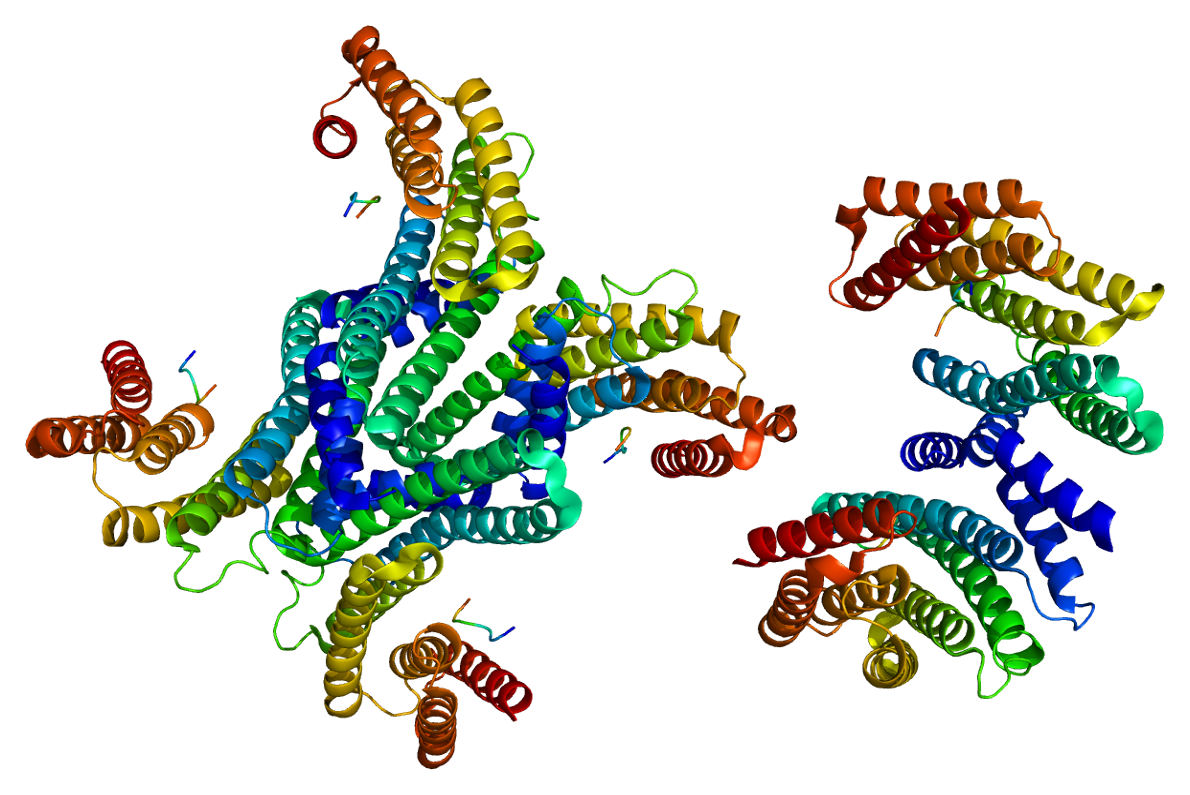

Identifiers
- Aliases: YWHAG, 14-3-3GAMMA, PPP1R170, tyrosine 3-monooxygenase/tryptophan 5-monooxygenase activation protein gamma, EIEE56, DEE56
- External IDs: OMIM: 605356; MGI: 108109; GeneCards: YWHAG
Available structures
PDB	Ortholog search: PDBe RCSB
PDB	List of PDB id codes 2B05, 3UZD, 4E2E, 4J6S, 4O46, 5D3E

Gene location (Human)
Chr.	Chromosome 7 (human)
Band	7q11.23	Start	76,326,799 bp
Band	7q11.23	End	76,358,991 bp

Gene location (Mouse)
Chr.	Chromosome 5 (mouse)
Band	5|5 G2	Start	135,937,263 bp
Band	5|5 G2	End	135,963,470 bp
RNA expression pattern
Bgee	Human / Mouse (ortholog); Top expressed in: lateral nuclear group of thalamus; pons; pars compacta; Brodmann area 23; spinal ganglia; superior vestibular nucleus; pars reticulata; middle temporal gyrus; endothelial cell; Brodmann area 46 / Top expressed in: CA3 field; perirhinal cortex; entorhinal cortex; primary motor cortex; dorsomedial hypothalamic nucleus; dorsal tegmental nucleus; anterior amygdaloid area; ventral tegmental area; subiculum; ventromedial nucleus; More reference expression data
BioGPS	n/a
Gene ontology
Molecular function	insulin-like growth factor receptor binding; protein domain specific binding; receptor tyrosine kinase binding; protein binding; protein kinase C binding; protein kinase C inhibitor activity; RNA binding; identical protein binding
Cellular component	cytoplasm; cytosol; membrane; focal adhesion; myelin sheath; extracellular exosome; cytoplasmic vesicle membrane; mitochondrion; vesicle; synapse; presynapse
Biological process	regulation of neuron differentiation; protein targeting; negative regulation of protein kinase activity; regulation of synaptic plasticity; positive regulation of protein insertion into mitochondrial membrane involved in apoptotic signaling pathway; regulation of signal transduction; G2/M transition of mitotic cell cycle; cellular response to insulin stimulus; membrane organization; negative regulation of protein serine/threonine kinase activity; ciliary basal body-plasma membrane docking; regulation of G2/M transition of mitotic cell cycle
Sources:Amigo / QuickGO
Orthologs
Databases	NCBI: entry; OMA: entry
Species	Human	Mouse
Entrez	7532	22628
Ensembl	ENSG00000170027	ENSMUSG00000051391
UniProt	P61981	P61982
RefSeq (mRNA)	NM_012479	NM_018871
RefSeq (protein)	NP_036611	NP_061359
Location (UCSC)	Chr 7: 76.33 – 76.36 Mb	Chr 5: 135.94 – 135.96 Mb
PubMed search
- Wikidata
View/Edit Human	View/Edit Mouse

14-3-3 protein gamma is a protein that in humans is encoded by the YWHAG gene.

This gene product belongs to the 14-3-3 protein family which mediate signal transduction by binding to phosphoserine-containing proteins. This highly conserved protein family is found in both plants and mammals, and this protein is 100% identical to the rat ortholog. It is induced by growth factors in human vascular smooth muscle cells, and is also highly expressed in skeletal and heart muscles, suggesting an important role for this protein in muscle tissue. It has been shown to interact with RAF1 and protein kinase C, proteins involved in various signal transduction pathways.

== Interactions ==
YWHAG has been shown to interact with C-Raf, EPB41L3, KIF1C and Stratifin.
