= Band 4.1-like protein 3 =

Protein-coding gene in the species Homo sapiens

EPB41L3
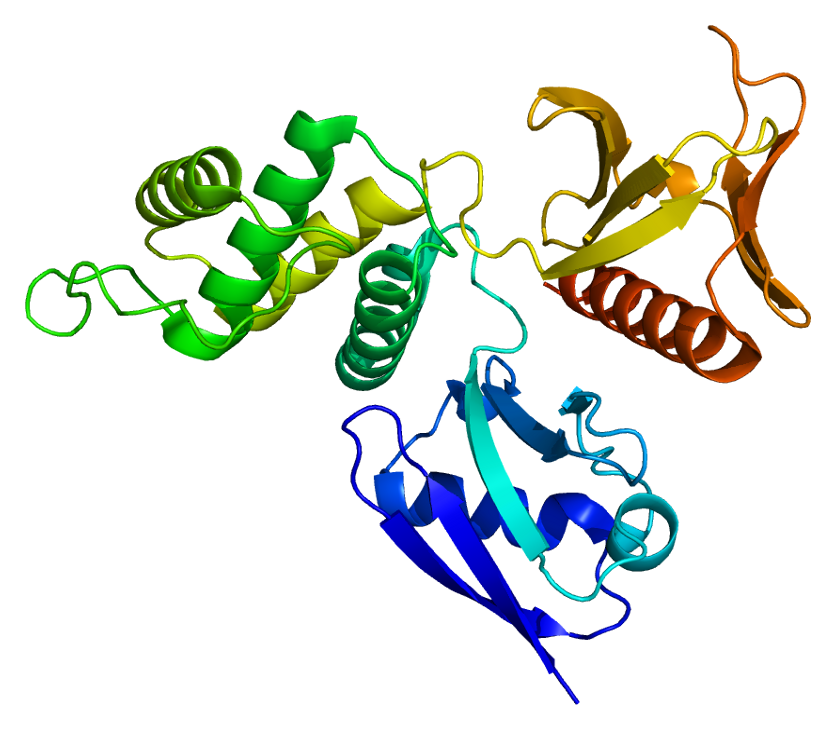

Identifiers
- Aliases: EPB41L3, 4.1B, DAL-1, DAL1, erythrocyte membrane protein band 4.1 like 3
- External IDs: OMIM: 605331; MGI: 103008; GeneCards: EPB41L3
Available structures
PDB	Ortholog search: PDBe RCSB
PDB	List of PDB id codes 2HE7, 3BIN

Gene location (Human)
Chr.	Chromosome 18 (human)
Band	18p11.31	Start	5,392,381 bp
Band	18p11.31	End	5,630,700 bp

Gene location (Mouse)
Chr.	Chromosome 17 (mouse)
Band	17 E1.3|17 40.15 cM	Start	69,075,683 bp
Band	17 E1.3|17 40.15 cM	End	69,289,989 bp
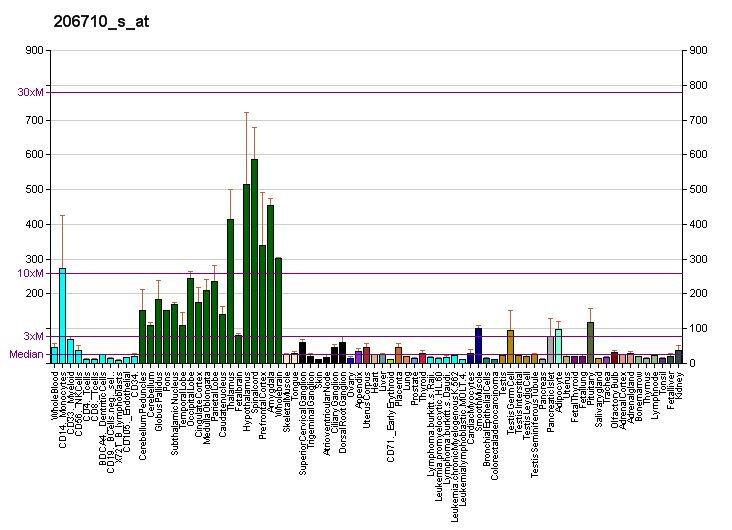

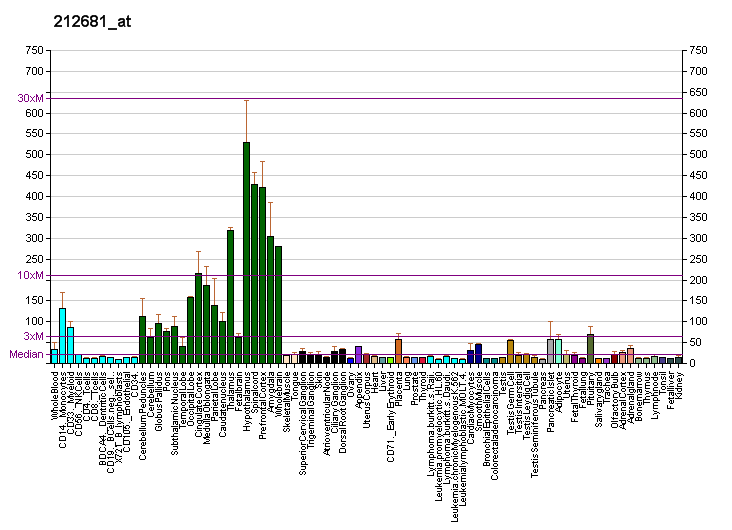

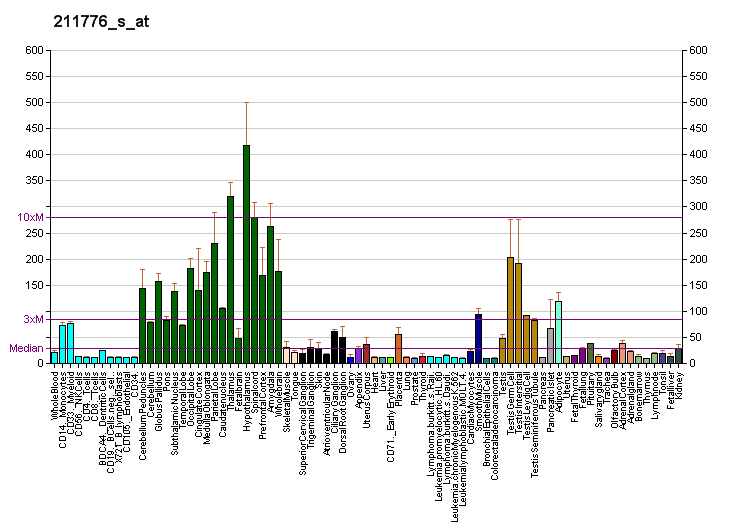
RNA expression pattern
Bgee	Human / Mouse (ortholog); Top expressed in: pons; lateral nuclear group of thalamus; Brodmann area 10; C1 segment; sperm; frontal pole; middle frontal gyrus; spinal ganglia; subthalamic nucleus; paraflocculus of cerebellum / Top expressed in: facial motor nucleus; anterior horn of spinal cord; epithelium of small intestine; central gray substance of midbrain; pontine nuclei; deep cerebellar nuclei; medial vestibular nucleus; lateral geniculate nucleus; inferior colliculi; superior colliculus; More reference expression data
BioGPS	More reference expression data
Gene ontology
Molecular function	structural molecule activity; cytoskeletal protein binding; structural constituent of cytoskeleton; protein binding; actin binding
Cellular component	cytoplasm; membrane; cell junction; juxtaparanode region of axon; paranode region of axon; axolemma; cell-cell junction; cytosol; cytoskeleton; plasma membrane; postsynaptic density
Biological process	apoptotic process; cortical cytoskeleton organization; cytoskeleton organization; regulation of cell growth; cortical actin cytoskeleton organization; paranodal junction assembly; myelin maintenance; protein localization to juxtaparanode region of axon; neuron projection morphogenesis; protein localization to plasma membrane; regulation of cell shape; protein localization to paranode region of axon; actomyosin structure organization; biological process
Sources:Amigo / QuickGO
Orthologs
Databases	NCBI: entry; OMA: entry
Species	Human	Mouse
Entrez	23136	13823
Ensembl	ENSG00000082397	ENSMUSG00000024044
UniProt	Q9Y2J2	Q9WV92
RefSeq (mRNA)	NM_001281533; NM_001281534; NM_001281535; NM_012307; NM_001330557	NM_013813; NM_001355732; NM_001355733; NM_001355734; NM_001355735 NM_001355736
RefSeq (protein)	NP_001268462; NP_001268463; NP_001268464; NP_001317486; NP_036439	NP_038841; NP_001342661; NP_001342662; NP_001342663; NP_001342664 NP_001342665
Location (UCSC)	Chr 18: 5.39 – 5.63 Mb	Chr 17: 69.08 – 69.29 Mb
PubMed search
- Wikidata
View/Edit Human	View/Edit Mouse

Band 4.1-like protein 3 is a protein that in humans is encoded by the EPB41L3 gene.

== Interactions ==
EPB41L3 has been shown to interact with YWHAB, YWHAH, YWHAG and Cell adhesion molecule 1.
