= Poliovirus receptor-related 1 =

Protein-coding gene in the species Homo sapiens

NECTIN1

Identifiers
- Aliases: NECTIN1, CD111, CLPED1, ED4, HIgR, HV1S, HVEC, OFC7, PRR, PRR1, PVRR, PVRR1, SK-12, nectin-1, PVRL1, nectin cell adhesion molecule 1
- External IDs: OMIM: 600644; MGI: 1926483; GeneCards: NECTIN1
Available structures
PDB	Ortholog search: PDBe RCSB
PDB	List of PDB id codes 3ALP, 3SKU, 3U83, 4FMF, 4MYW

Gene location (Human)
Chr.	Chromosome 11 (human)
Band	11q23.3	Start	119,623,408 bp
Band	11q23.3	End	119,729,200 bp

Gene location (Mouse)
Chr.	Chromosome 9 (mouse)
Band	9|9 A5.1	Start	43,655,281 bp
Band	9|9 A5.1	End	43,743,955 bp
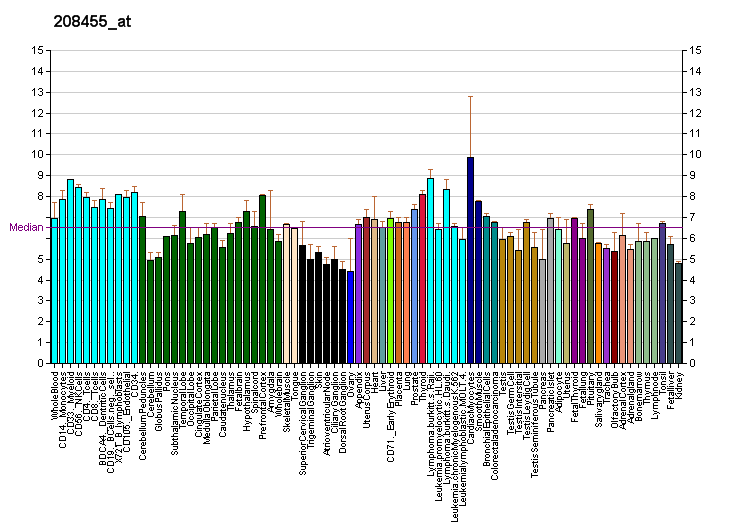

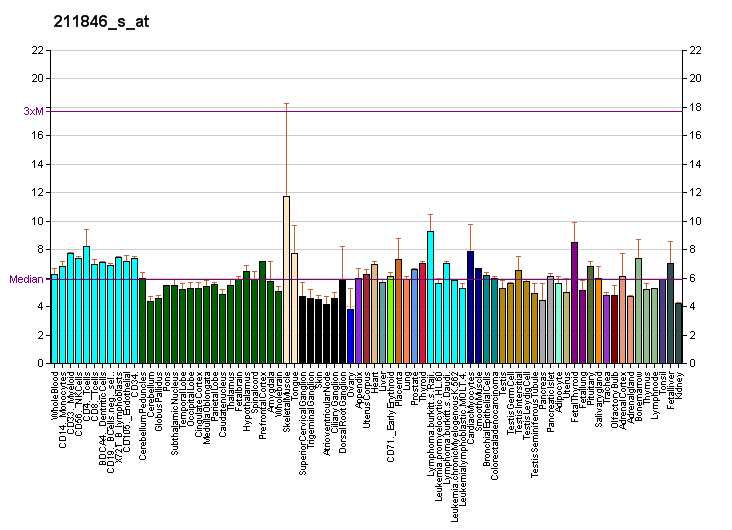

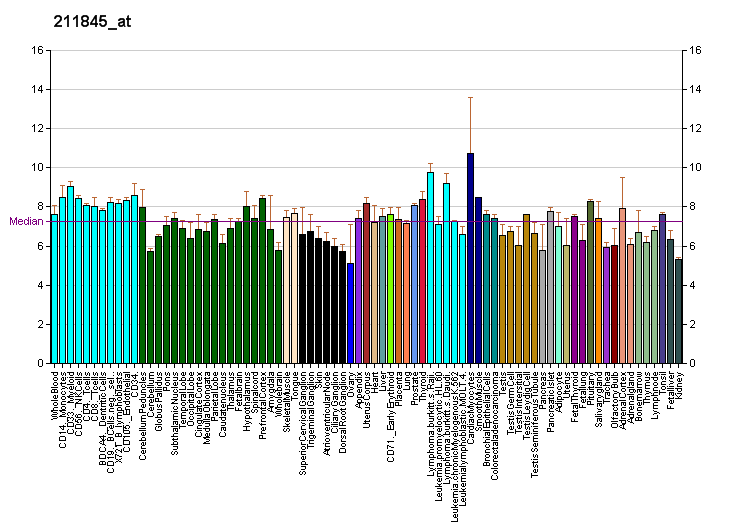
RNA expression pattern
Bgee	Human / Mouse (ortholog); Top expressed in: skin of abdomen; skin of leg; nipple; mucosa of pharynx; body of tongue; gingival epithelium; lateral nuclear group of thalamus; subthalamic nucleus; vulva; external globus pallidus / Top expressed in: lip; neural layer of retina; molar; dentate gyrus of hippocampal formation granule cell; visual cortex; epiblast; primary visual cortex; decidua; genital tubercle; cerebellar cortex; More reference expression data
BioGPS	More reference expression data
Gene ontology
Molecular function	protein homodimerization activity; coreceptor activity; virus receptor activity; protein binding; protein heterodimerization activity; virion binding; signaling receptor binding; carbohydrate binding; cell adhesion molecule binding; identical protein binding; signaling receptor activity
Cellular component	integral component of membrane; membrane; intracellular membrane-bounded organelle; plasma membrane; growth cone membrane; synapse; integral component of plasma membrane; extracellular region; axon; cell junction; neuron projection; catenin complex; presynaptic membrane; apical junction complex; cell-cell contact zone; cell-cell junction; adherens junction; dendrite; hippocampal mossy fiber to CA3 synapse; integral component of presynaptic active zone membrane
Biological process	heterophilic cell-cell adhesion via plasma membrane cell adhesion molecules; cell recognition; desmosome organization; regulation of synapse assembly; axon guidance; cell adhesion; iron ion transport; lens morphogenesis in camera-type eye; retina development in camera-type eye; immune response; viral entry into host cell; enamel mineralization; viral process; adherens junction organization; camera-type eye morphogenesis; homophilic cell adhesion via plasma membrane adhesion molecules; signal transduction; protein localization to cell junction; cell-cell adhesion; virion attachment to host cell
Sources:Amigo / QuickGO
Orthologs
Databases	NCBI: entry; OMA: entry
Species	Human	Mouse
Entrez	5818	58235
Ensembl	ENSG00000110400	ENSMUSG00000032012
UniProt	Q15223	Q9JKF6
RefSeq (mRNA)	NM_203286; NM_002855; NM_032767; NM_203285	NM_021424
RefSeq (protein)	NP_002846; NP_976030; NP_976031	NP_067399
Location (UCSC)	Chr 11: 119.62 – 119.73 Mb	Chr 9: 43.66 – 43.74 Mb
PubMed search
- Wikidata
View/Edit Human	View/Edit Mouse

Poliovirus receptor-related 1 (PVRL1), also known as nectin-1 and CD111 (formerly herpesvirus entry mediator C, HVEC), is a human protein of the immunoglobulin superfamily (IgSF), also considered a member of the nectins. It is a membrane protein with three extracellular immunoglobulin domains, a single transmembrane helix and a cytoplasmic tail. The protein can mediate Ca^{2+}-independent cellular adhesion further characterizing it as IgSF cell adhesion molecule (IgSF CAM).

== Function ==
PVRL1 is an adhesion molecule found in a wide range of tissues where it localizes in various junctions such as the adherens junction of epithelial tissue or the chemical synapse of neurons. The cytoplasmic tail of PVRL1 can bind the protein afadin which is a scaffolding protein that binds actin.

In the chemical synapse PVRL1 interacts with PVRL3 (nectin-3) and both proteins can be found in neuronal tissue already in early stages of brain development as well as in aging brains. The two proteins have been found to localize asymmetrically along the chemical synapse, with PVRL1 primarily on the axonal side and PVRL3 on the dendritic side.

The protein has been revealed as one of the key players in mediating cellular entry of the Herpes simplex virus by interacting with the viral glycoprotein D (gD).

== See also ==
- Cluster of differentiation

== Interactions ==
PVRL1 has been shown to interact with MLLT4.
