= CADM3 =

Protein-coding gene in humans

Identifiers
- Aliases: CADM3, BIgR, IGSF4B, NECL1, Necl-1, TSLL1, synCAM3, cell adhesion molecule 3, CMT2FF
- External IDs: OMIM: 609743; MGI: 2137858; GeneCards: CADM3
Available structures
PDB	Ortholog search: PDBe RCSB
PDB	List of PDB id codes 1Z9M

Gene location (Human)
Chr.	Chromosome 1 (human)
Band	1q23.2	Start	159,171,609 bp
Band	1q23.2	End	159,203,313 bp

Gene location (Mouse)
Chr.	Chromosome 1 (mouse)
Band	1|1 H3	Start	173,160,825 bp
Band	1|1 H3	End	173,195,261 bp
RNA expression pattern
Bgee	Human / Mouse (ortholog); Top expressed in: cerebellar hemisphere; right hemisphere of cerebellum; right frontal lobe; tibial nerve; anterior cingulate cortex; nucleus accumbens; Brodmann area 9; prefrontal cortex; sural nerve; amygdala / Top expressed in: cerebellar cortex; neural layer of retina; superior frontal gyrus; primary visual cortex; dentate gyrus of hippocampal formation granule cell; piriform cortex; lobe of cerebellum; cerebellar vermis; motor neuron; sciatic nerve; More reference expression data
BioGPS	n/a
Gene ontology
Molecular function	signaling receptor binding; protein homodimerization activity; cell adhesion molecule binding
Cellular component	integral component of membrane; cell junction; plasma membrane; integral component of plasma membrane; membrane; cell-cell junction; parallel fiber to Purkinje cell synapse; integral component of presynaptic membrane
Biological process	protein localization; heterophilic cell-cell adhesion via plasma membrane cell adhesion molecules; cell adhesion; cell recognition; adherens junction organization; homophilic cell adhesion via plasma membrane adhesion molecules
Sources:Amigo / QuickGO
Orthologs
Databases	NCBI: entry; OMA: entry
Species	Human	Mouse
Entrez	57863	94332
Ensembl	ENSG00000162706	ENSMUSG00000005338
UniProt	Q8N126	Q99N28
RefSeq (mRNA)	NM_021189; NM_001127173; NM_001346510	NM_053199
RefSeq (protein)	NP_001120645; NP_001333439; NP_067012	NP_444429
Location (UCSC)	Chr 1: 159.17 – 159.2 Mb	Chr 1: 173.16 – 173.2 Mb
PubMed search
- Wikidata
View/Edit Human	View/Edit Mouse

Cell adhesion molecule 3 is a protein that in humans is encoded by the CADM3 gene.

IGSF4B is a brain-specific protein related to the calcium-independent cell-cell adhesion molecules known as nectins (see PVRL3; MIM 607147) (Kakunaga et al., 2005).
