= Stratifin =

Protein found in humans

SFN
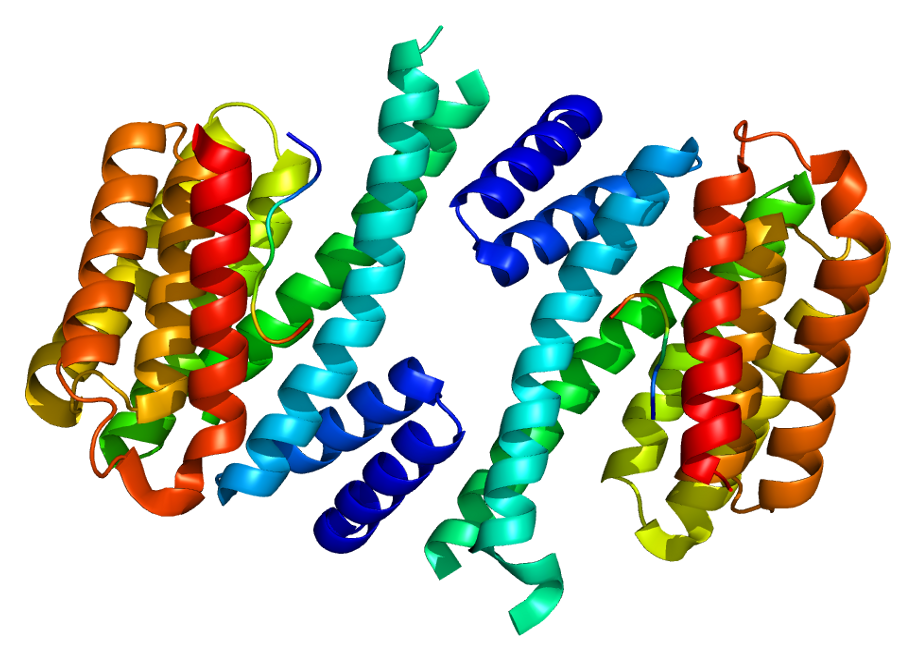

Identifiers
- Aliases: SFN, YWHAS, Stratifin
- External IDs: OMIM: 601290; MGI: 1891831; GeneCards: SFN
Available structures
PDB	Ortholog search: PDBe RCSB
PDB	List of PDB id codes 1YWT, 1YZ5, 3IQJ, 3IQU, 3IQV, 3LW1, 3MHR, 3O8I, 3P1N, 3P1O, 3P1P, 3P1Q, 3P1R, 3P1S, 3SMK, 3SML, 3SMM, 3SMN, 3SMO, 3SPR, 3T0L, 3T0M, 3U9X, 3UX0, 4DAT, 4DAU, 4DHM, 4DHN, 4DHO, 4DHP, 4DHQ, 4DHR, 4DHS, 4DHT, 4DHU, 4FL5, 4FR3, 4HQW, 4HRU, 4IEA, 4JC3, 4JDD, 4QLI, 5HF3, 4Y5I, 4Y32, 4Y3B, 3SP5

Gene location (Human)
Chr.	Chromosome 1 (human)
Band	1p36.11	Start	26,863,149 bp
Band	1p36.11	End	26,864,456 bp

Gene location (Mouse)
Chr.	Chromosome 4 (mouse)
Band	4 D2.3|4 66.25 cM	Start	133,327,867 bp
Band	4 D2.3|4 66.25 cM	End	133,329,479 bp
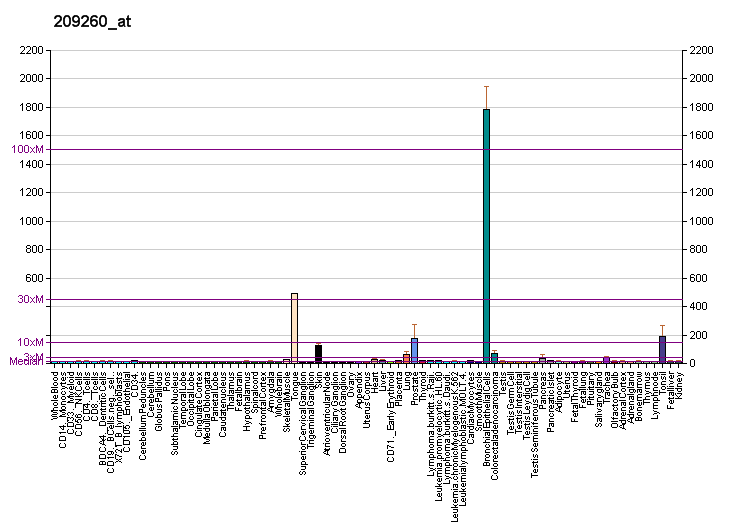

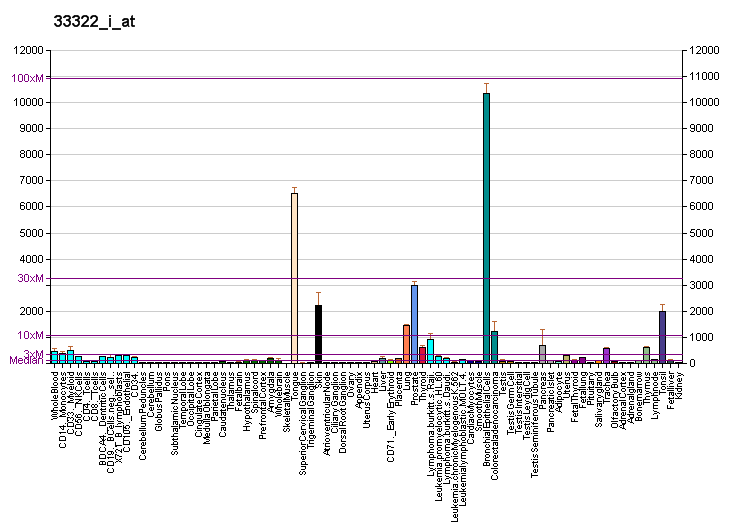

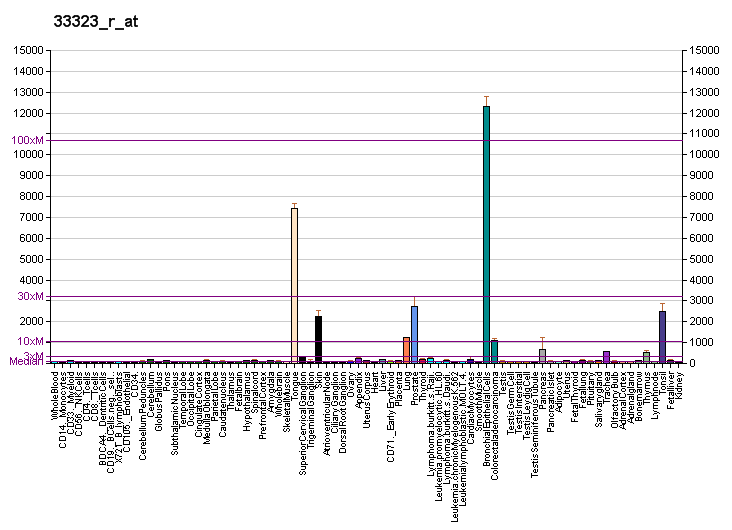
RNA expression pattern
Bgee	Human / Mouse (ortholog); Top expressed in: gingival epithelium; hair follicle; mucosa of pharynx; nipple; vulva; skin of thigh; human penis; skin of hip; oral cavity; body of tongue / Top expressed in: lip; esophagus; blastocyst; morula; skin of abdomen; skin of external ear; transitional epithelium of urinary bladder; skin of back; intestinal villus; cervix; More reference expression data
BioGPS	More reference expression data
Gene ontology
Molecular function	protein domain specific binding; phosphoprotein binding; protein binding; protein kinase binding; protein kinase C inhibitor activity; identical protein binding; cadherin binding
Cellular component	extracellular region; extracellular exosome; cytoplasmic vesicle membrane; nucleus; mitochondrion; extracellular space; cytoplasm; cytosol
Biological process	regulation of cyclin-dependent protein serine/threonine kinase activity; negative regulation of cysteine-type endopeptidase activity involved in apoptotic process; negative regulation of keratinocyte proliferation; negative regulation of protein kinase activity; establishment of skin barrier; keratinization; keratinocyte differentiation; regulation of cell cycle; positive regulation of protein export from nucleus; positive regulation of protein insertion into mitochondrial membrane involved in apoptotic signaling pathway; keratinocyte development; positive regulation of cell growth; regulation of epidermal cell division; intrinsic apoptotic signaling pathway in response to DNA damage; membrane organization; positive regulation of epidermal cell differentiation; signal transduction; release of cytochrome c from mitochondria; skin development; negative regulation of protein serine/threonine kinase activity; DNA damage response, signal transduction by p53 class mediator resulting in cell cycle arrest
Sources:Amigo / QuickGO
Orthologs
Databases	NCBI: entry; OMA: entry
Species	Human	Mouse
Entrez	2810	55948
Ensembl	ENSG00000175793	ENSMUSG00000047281
UniProt	P31947	O70456
RefSeq (mRNA)	NM_006142	NM_018754
RefSeq (protein)	NP_006133	NP_061224
Location (UCSC)	Chr 1: 26.86 – 26.86 Mb	Chr 4: 133.33 – 133.33 Mb
PubMed search
- Wikidata
View/Edit Human	View/Edit Mouse

Stratifin (also known as 14-3-3 protein sigma or 14-3-3σ protein) is a protein encoded by the SFN gene in humans. The protein is named for its presence in stratified epithelial cells.

== Interactions ==
Stratifin has been shown to interact with PLK4, ERRFI1, MARK3, AJUBA and YWHAG.
