= MARK3 =

Protein-coding gene in the species Homo sapiens

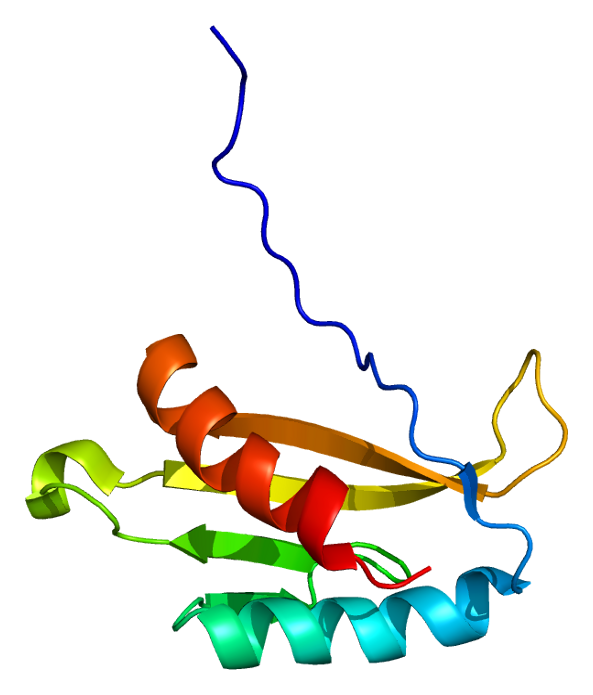

Identifiers
- Aliases: MARK3, CTAK1, KP78, PAR1A, Par-1a, microtubule affinity regulating kinase 3, VIPB
- External IDs: OMIM: 602678; MGI: 1341865; GeneCards: MARK3
Available structures
PDB	Ortholog search: PDBe RCSB
PDB	List of PDB id codes 2QNJ, 3FE3
Enzyme activity
EC #	BRENDA	ExPASy	KEGG	MetaCyc
2.7.11.1	↗	↗	↗	↗

Gene location (Human)
Chr.	Chromosome 14 (human)
Band	14q32.32-q32.33	Start	103,385,377 bp
Band	14q32.32-q32.33	End	103,503,831 bp

Gene location (Mouse)
Chr.	Chromosome 12 (mouse)
Band	12|12 F1	Start	111,540,957 bp
Band	12|12 F1	End	111,622,655 bp
RNA expression pattern
Bgee	Human / Mouse (ortholog); Top expressed in: cerebellar hemisphere; right hemisphere of cerebellum; body of pancreas; apex of heart; right adrenal cortex; left uterine tube; right lung; right auricle of heart; left adrenal gland; left adrenal cortex / Top expressed in: genital tubercle; tail of embryo; ventricular zone; spermatid; molar; right kidney; proximal tubule; Gonadal ridge; otic vesicle; ganglionic eminence; More reference expression data
BioGPS	n/a
Gene ontology
Molecular function	transferase activity; nucleotide binding; protein kinase activity; kinase activity; protein binding; ATP binding; protein serine/threonine kinase activity; tau protein binding; tau-protein kinase activity
Cellular component	cytosol; membrane; extracellular exosome; plasma membrane; cytoplasm; dendrite; cell projection
Biological process	phosphorylation; MAPK cascade; protein phosphorylation; microtubule cytoskeleton organization; establishment of cell polarity; negative regulation of hippo signaling; peptidyl-serine phosphorylation; positive regulation of protein binding; intracellular signal transduction; peptidyl-serine autophosphorylation
Sources:Amigo / QuickGO
Orthologs
Databases	NCBI: entry; OMA: entry
Species	Human	Mouse
Entrez	4140	17169
Ensembl	ENSG00000075413	ENSMUSG00000007411
UniProt	P27448	Q03141
RefSeq (mRNA)	NM_001128918; NM_001128919; NM_001128920; NM_001128921; NM_002376	NM_021516; NM_022801; NM_001370744; NM_001370745
RefSeq (protein)	NP_001122390; NP_001122391; NP_001122392; NP_001122393; NP_002367	NP_067491; NP_073712; NP_001357673; NP_001357674
Location (UCSC)	Chr 14: 103.39 – 103.5 Mb	Chr 12: 111.54 – 111.62 Mb
PubMed search
- Wikidata
View/Edit Human	View/Edit Mouse

MAP/microtubule affinity-regulating kinase 3 is an enzyme that in humans is encoded by the MARK3 gene.

== Interactions ==
MARK3 has been shown to interact with Stratifin.

It has been linked to a form of genetic blindness, believed to be a genetic recessive disease that progressively destroys the eyes.
