= ERRFI1 =

Protein-coding gene in humans

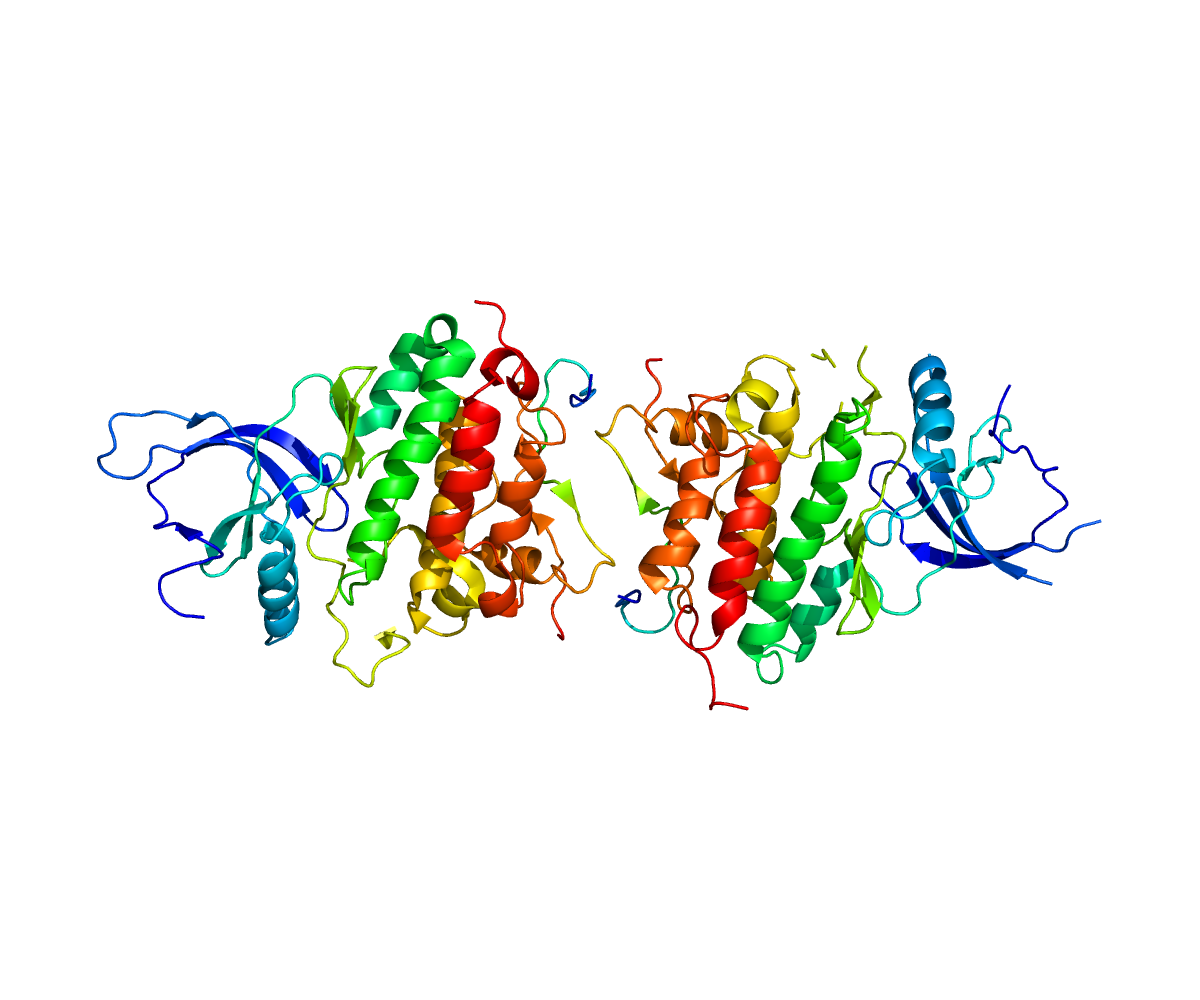

Identifiers
- Aliases: ERRFI1, GENE-33, MIG-6, MIG6, RALT, ERBB receptor feedback inhibitor 1
- External IDs: OMIM: 608069; MGI: 1921405; GeneCards: ERRFI1
Available structures
PDB	Ortholog search: PDBe RCSB
PDB	List of PDB id codes 2RF9, 2RFD, 2RFE, 4I21, 4R3P, 4R3R, 4ZJV

Gene location (Human)
Chr.	Chromosome 1 (human)
Band	1p36.23	Start	8,004,404 bp
Band	1p36.23	End	8,026,309 bp

Gene location (Mouse)
Chr.	Chromosome 4 (mouse)
Band	4|4 E2	Start	150,938,376 bp
Band	4|4 E2	End	150,953,349 bp
RNA expression pattern
Bgee	Human / Mouse (ortholog); Top expressed in: body of pancreas; vena cava; right lobe of liver; tibialis anterior muscle; gastric mucosa; tibial arteries; synovial joint; left ovary; cartilage tissue; ascending aorta / Top expressed in: left lobe of liver; gastrula; decidua; gallbladder; human kidney; endothelial cell of lymphatic vessel; right lung lobe; left lung; left lung lobe; right kidney; More reference expression data
BioGPS	n/a
Gene ontology
Molecular function	GTPase activator activity; SH3 domain binding; kinase binding; protein binding; protein kinase binding; small GTPase binding
Cellular component	membrane; extrinsic component of cytoplasmic side of plasma membrane; plasma membrane; nucleus; cytoplasm; cytosol
Biological process	negative regulation of interleukin-1 beta production; negative regulation of epidermal growth factor receptor signaling pathway; skin morphogenesis; negative regulation of protein autophosphorylation; cellular response to platelet-derived growth factor stimulus; cellular response to dexamethasone stimulus; cellular response to epidermal growth factor stimulus; cellular hyperosmotic response; negative regulation of epidermal growth factor-activated receptor activity; negative regulation of peptidyl-tyrosine phosphorylation; cellular response to insulin stimulus; negative regulation of ERK1 and ERK2 cascade; regulation of keratinocyte differentiation; lung alveolus development; lung vasculature development; lung epithelium development; regulation of type B pancreatic cell proliferation; negative regulation of collagen biosynthetic process; negative regulation of cardiac muscle hypertrophy in response to stress; positive regulation of GTPase activity
Sources:Amigo / QuickGO
Orthologs
Databases	NCBI: entry; OMA: entry
Species	Human	Mouse
Entrez	54206	74155
Ensembl	ENSG00000116285	ENSMUSG00000028967
UniProt	Q9UJM3	Q99JZ7
RefSeq (mRNA)	NM_018948	NM_133753; NM_001356323
RefSeq (protein)	NP_061821	NP_598514; NP_001343252
Location (UCSC)	Chr 1: 8 – 8.03 Mb	Chr 4: 150.94 – 150.95 Mb
PubMed search
- Wikidata
View/Edit Human	View/Edit Mouse

ERBB receptor feedback inhibitor 1 is a protein that in humans is encoded by the ERRFI1 gene.

MIG6 is a Cytoplasmic protein whose expression is upregulated with cell growth (Wick et al., 1995). It shares significant homology with the protein product of rat gene-33, which is induced during cell stress and mediates cell signaling (Makkinje et al., 2000; Fiorentino et al., 2000).

== Interactions ==
ERRFI1 has been shown to interact with Stratifin and CDC42.
