= PLK4 =

Protein-coding gene in the species Homo sapiens

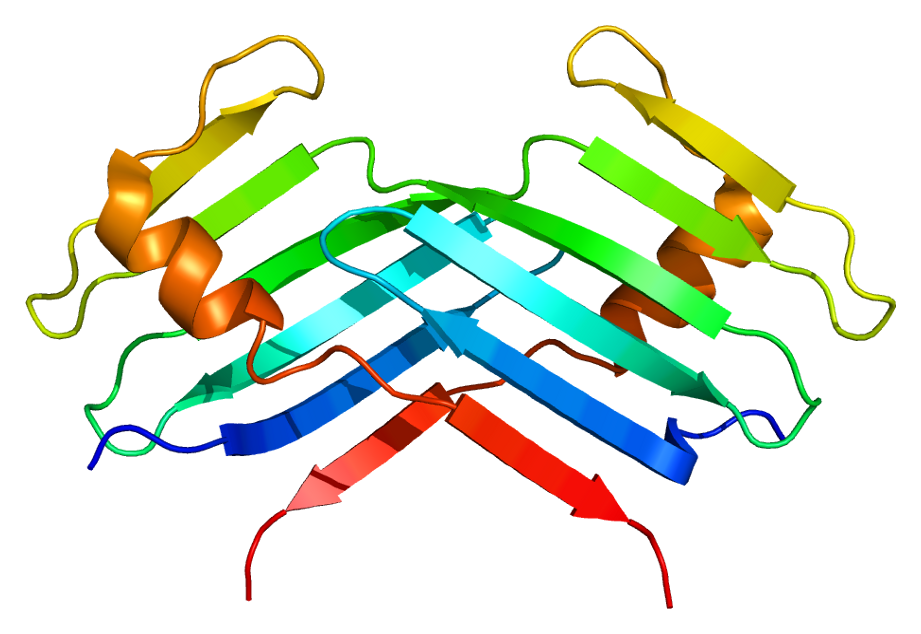

Identifiers
- Aliases: PLK4, SAK, STK18, MCCRP2, polo like kinase 4
- External IDs: OMIM: 605031; MGI: 101783; GeneCards: PLK4
Available structures
PDB	Ortholog search: PDBe RCSB
PDB	List of PDB id codes 2N19, 3COK, 4JXF, 4N7V, 4N7Z, 4N9J, 4YUR, 4YYP
Enzyme activity
EC #	BRENDA	ExPASy	KEGG	MetaCyc
2.7.11.21	↗	↗	↗	↗

Gene location (Human)
Chr.	Chromosome 4 (human)
Band	4q28.1	Start	127,880,893 bp
Band	4q28.1	End	127,899,224 bp

Gene location (Mouse)
Chr.	Chromosome 3 (mouse)
Band	3|3 B	Start	40,754,454 bp
Band	3|3 B	End	40,771,318 bp
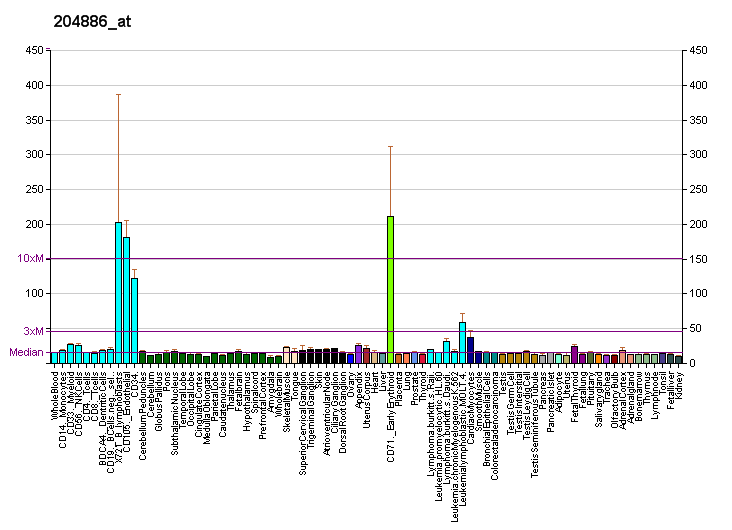

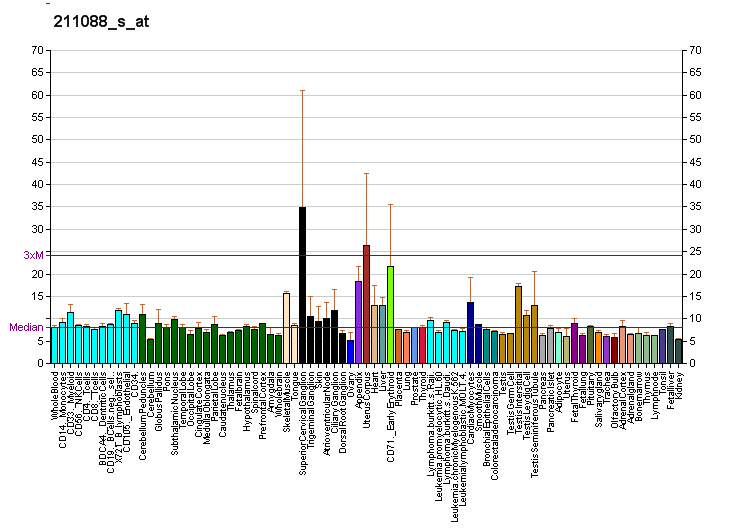

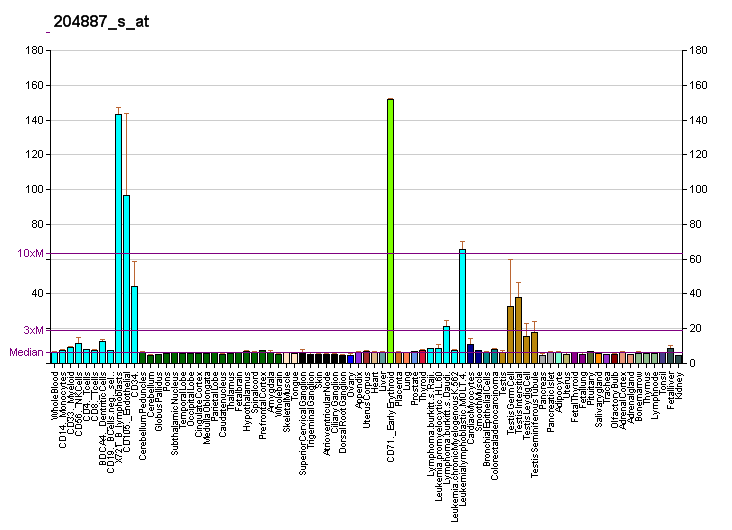
RNA expression pattern
Bgee	Human / Mouse (ortholog); Top expressed in: ventricular zone; ganglionic eminence; gonad; sperm; testicle; left testis; right testis; bone marrow; bone marrow cell; rectum / Top expressed in: zygote; tail of embryo; secondary oocyte; primary oocyte; genital tubercle; spermatid; spermatocyte; ventricular zone; epiblast; embryo; More reference expression data
BioGPS	More reference expression data
Gene ontology
Molecular function	transferase activity; nucleotide binding; protein kinase activity; kinase activity; protein serine/threonine kinase activity; protein binding; ATP binding; identical protein binding
Cellular component	cytoplasm; centrosome; deuterosome; XY body; nucleolus; centriole; cleavage furrow; cytoskeleton; nucleus; cytosol
Biological process	trophoblast giant cell differentiation; phosphorylation; de novo centriole assembly involved in multi-ciliated epithelial cell differentiation; G2/M transition of mitotic cell cycle; centriole replication; positive regulation of centriole replication; ciliary basal body-plasma membrane docking; regulation of G2/M transition of mitotic cell cycle; protein phosphorylation
Sources:Amigo / QuickGO
Orthologs
Databases	NCBI: entry; OMA: entry
Species	Human	Mouse
Entrez	10733	20873
Ensembl	ENSG00000142731	ENSMUSG00000025758
UniProt	O00444	Q64702
RefSeq (mRNA)	NM_001190799; NM_001190801; NM_014264	NM_011495; NM_173169
RefSeq (protein)	NP_001177728; NP_001177730; NP_055079	NP_035625; NP_775261
Location (UCSC)	Chr 4: 127.88 – 127.9 Mb	Chr 3: 40.75 – 40.77 Mb
PubMed search
- Wikidata
View/Edit Human	View/Edit Mouse

Serine/threonine-protein kinase PLK4 also known as polo-like kinase 4 is an enzyme that in humans is encoded by the PLK4 gene. The Drosophila homolog is SAK, the C. elegans homolog is zyg-1, and the Xenopus homolog is Plx4.

== Function ==
PLK4 encodes a member of the polo family of serine/threonine protein kinases. The protein localizes to centrioles—complex microtubule-based structures found in centrosomes—and regulates centriole duplication during the cell cycle. Overexpression of PLK4 results in centrosome amplification, and knockdown of PLK4 results in loss of centrosomes.

== Structure ==
PLK4 contains an N-terminal kinase domain (residues 12-284) and a C-terminal localization domain (residues 596-898). Other polo-like kinase members contain 2 C-terminal polo box domains (PBD). PLK4 contains these 2 domains in addition to a third PBD, which facilitates oligomerization, targeting, and promotes trans-autophosphorylation, limiting centriole duplication to once per cell cycle.

== As a cancer drug target ==
Inhibitors of the enzymatic activity PLK4 have potential in the treatment of cancer. The PLK4 inhibitor R1530 down regulates the expression of mitotic checkpoint kinase BubR1 that in turn leads to polyploidy rendering cancer cells unstable and more sensitive to cancer chemotherapy. Furthermore, normal cells are resistant to the polyploidy inducing effects of R1530.

Another PLK4 inhibitor, CFI-400945 has demonstrated efficacy in animal models of breast and ovarian cancer.

Another PLK4 inhibitor, centrinone, has been reported to deplete centrioles in human and other vertebrate cell types, which resulted in a p53-dependent cell cycle arrest in G1. Inhibition of PLK4 using a chemical genetic strategy has validated this p53-dependent cell cycle arrest in G1.

PLK4 was also identified as a potential therapeutic target for malignant rhabdoid tumors, medulloblastomas and possibly, other embryonal tumors of the brain.

== Interactions and substrates ==
Documented PLK4 substrates include STIL, GCP6, Hand1, Ect2, FBXW5, and itself (via autophosphorylation). Autophosphorylation of PLK4 results in ubiquitination and subsequent destruction by the proteasome.

PLK4 has been shown to interact with Stratifin.
