= EPHB3 =

Protein-coding gene in the species Homo sapiens

Identifiers
- Aliases: EPHB3, ETK2, HEK2, TYRO6, EPH receptor B3, EK2
- External IDs: OMIM: 601839; MGI: 104770; GeneCards: EPHB3
Available structures
PDB	Ortholog search: PDBe RCSB
PDB	List of PDB id codes 3P1I, 3ZFY
Enzyme activity
EC #	BRENDA	ExPASy	KEGG	MetaCyc
2.7.10.1	↗	↗	↗	↗

Gene location (Human)
Chr.	Chromosome 3 (human)
Band	3q27.1	Start	184,561,785 bp
Band	3q27.1	End	184,582,408 bp

Gene location (Mouse)
Chr.	Chromosome 16 (mouse)
Band	16|16 B1	Start	21,023,505 bp
Band	16|16 B1	End	21,042,055 bp
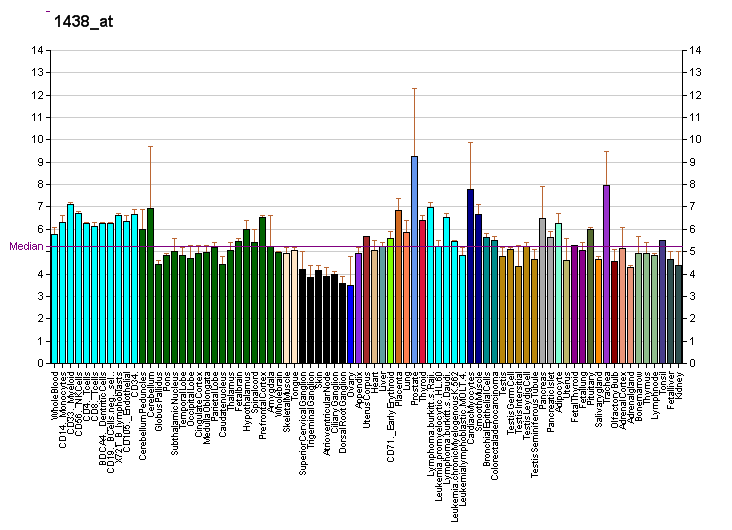

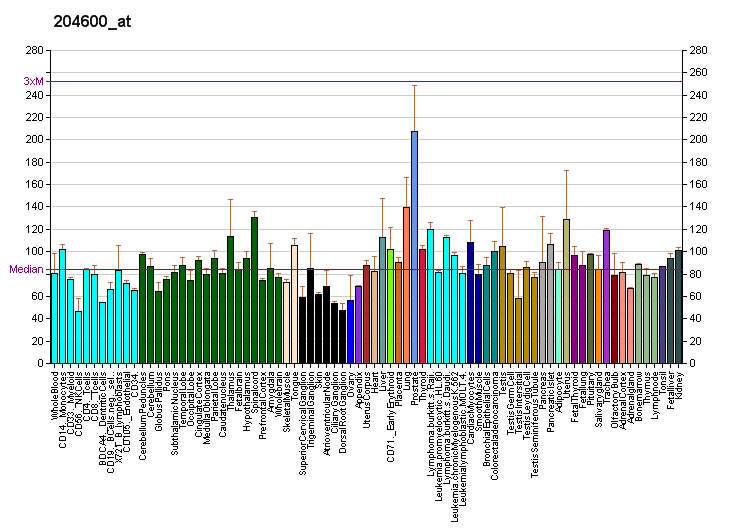
RNA expression pattern
Bgee	Human / Mouse (ortholog); Top expressed in: pancreatic ductal cell; skin of leg; skin of abdomen; gingival epithelium; parotid gland; mucosa of transverse colon; periodontal fiber; skin of arm; hair follicle; rectum / Top expressed in: saccule; otic placode; otic vesicle; lip; tongue; corneal stroma; molar; skin of abdomen; esophagus; calvaria; More reference expression data
BioGPS	More reference expression data
Gene ontology
Molecular function	nucleotide binding; transmembrane receptor protein tyrosine kinase activity; protein kinase activity; kinase activity; ATP binding; transferase activity; ephrin receptor activity; axon guidance receptor activity; protein tyrosine kinase activity; receptor tyrosine kinase; transmembrane signaling receptor activity; transmembrane-ephrin receptor activity
Cellular component	extracellular region; dendrite; integral component of membrane; cell projection; membrane; cytosol; plasma membrane; integral component of plasma membrane; cytoplasm; neuron projection; receptor complex
Biological process	phosphorylation; peptidyl-tyrosine phosphorylation; nervous system development; multicellular organism development; regulation of cell-cell adhesion; protein phosphorylation; substrate adhesion-dependent cell spreading; transmembrane receptor protein tyrosine kinase signaling pathway; regulation of GTPase activity; protein autophosphorylation; angiogenesis; ephrin receptor signaling pathway; urogenital system development; axon guidance; axonal fasciculation; cell migration; central nervous system projection neuron axonogenesis; corpus callosum development; retinal ganglion cell axon guidance; thymus development; digestive tract morphogenesis; regulation of axonogenesis; positive regulation of synapse assembly; roof of mouth development; dendritic spine development; dendritic spine morphogenesis; negative regulation of signal transduction; cell differentiation; negative regulation of apoptotic process; positive regulation of ERK1 and ERK2 cascade
Sources:Amigo / QuickGO
Orthologs
Databases	NCBI: entry; OMA: entry
Species	Human	Mouse
Entrez	2049	13845
Ensembl	ENSG00000182580	ENSMUSG00000005958
UniProt	P54753	P54754
RefSeq (mRNA)	NM_004443	NM_010143
RefSeq (protein)	NP_004434	NP_034273
Location (UCSC)	Chr 3: 184.56 – 184.58 Mb	Chr 16: 21.02 – 21.04 Mb
PubMed search
- Wikidata
View/Edit Human	View/Edit Mouse

Ephrin type-B receptor 3 is a protein that in humans is encoded by the EPHB3 gene.

== Function ==
Ephrin receptors and their ligands, the ephrins, mediate numerous developmental processes, particularly in the nervous system. Based on their structures and sequence relationships, ephrins are divided into the ephrin-A (EFNA) class, which are anchored to the membrane by a glycosylphosphatidylinositol linkage, and the ephrin-B (EFNB) class, which are transmembrane proteins. The Eph family of receptors are divided into 2 groups based on the similarity of their extracellular domain sequences and their affinities for binding ephrin-A and ephrin-B ligands. Ephrin receptors make up the largest subgroup of the receptor tyrosine kinase (RTK) family. The protein encoded by this gene is a receptor for ephrin-B family members.

== Interactions ==
EPHB3 has been shown to interact with MLLT4 and RAS p21 protein activator 1.
