= Afadin =

Protein found in humans

AFDN
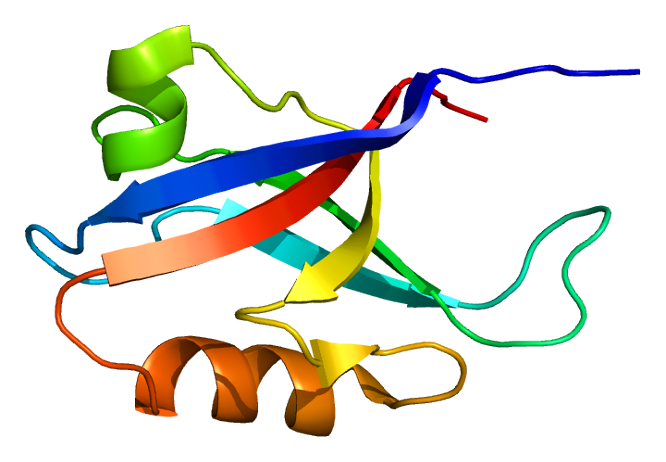

Identifiers
- Aliases: AFDN, AF6, MLL-AF6, MLLT4, myeloid/lymphoid or mixed-lineage leukemia; translocated to, 4, afadin, adherens junction formation factor, l-afadin
- External IDs: OMIM: 159559; MGI: 1314653; GeneCards: AFDN
Available structures
PDB	Ortholog search: PDBe RCSB
PDB	List of PDB id codes 1T2M, 1XZ9, 2AIN, 2EXG, 5A6C

Gene location (Human)
Chr.	Chromosome 6 (human)
Band	6q27	Start	167,826,911 bp
Band	6q27	End	167,972,023 bp

Gene location (Mouse)
Chr.	Chromosome 17 (mouse)
Band	17|17 A1- A2	Start	13,980,801 bp
Band	17|17 A1- A2	End	14,126,412 bp
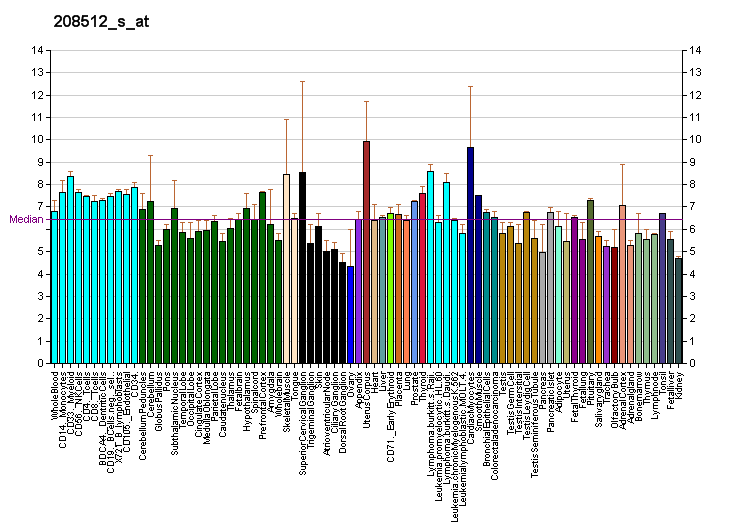

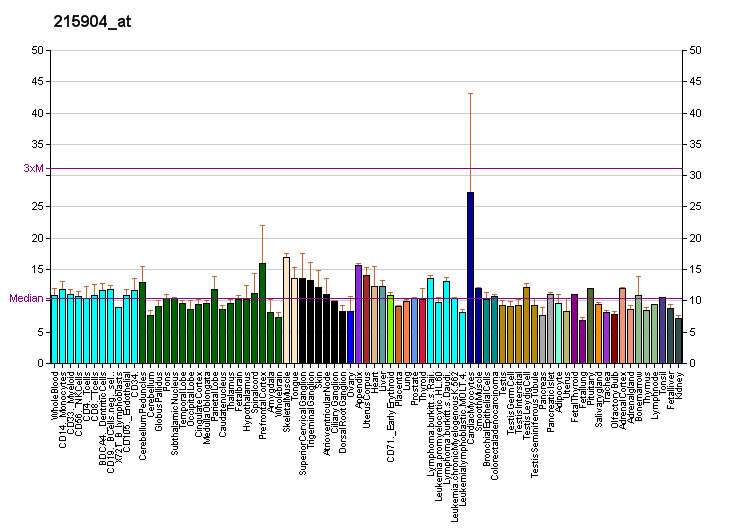

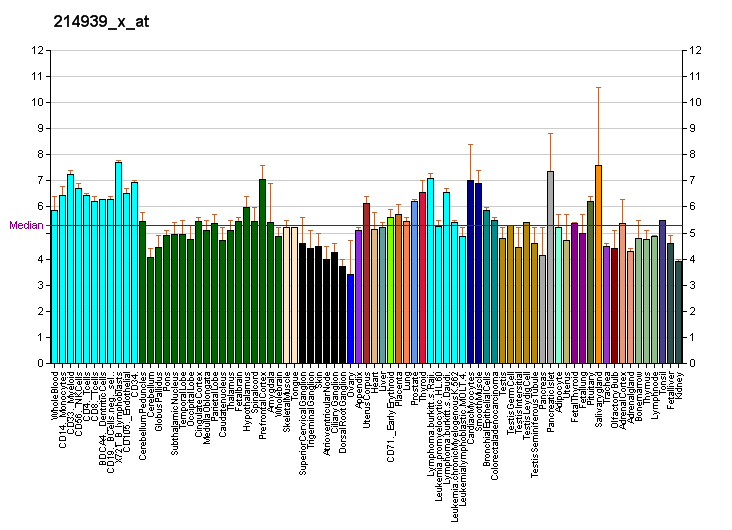
RNA expression pattern
Bgee	Human / Mouse (ortholog); Top expressed in: right uterine tube; sural nerve; bronchial epithelial cell; ganglionic eminence; right lung; buccal mucosa cell; minor salivary glands; body of pancreas; rectum; caput epididymis / Top expressed in: lip; superior cervical ganglion; hair follicle; skin of abdomen; skin of external ear; gastrula; otolith organ; utricle; conjunctival fornix; medullary collecting duct; More reference expression data
BioGPS	More reference expression data
Gene ontology
Molecular function	protein C-terminus binding; protein binding; cadherin binding; cell adhesion molecule binding; actin filament binding
Cellular component	adherens junction; cell junction; plasma membrane; nucleoplasm; cytosol; cell-cell junction; nuclear speck; cell-cell contact zone; tight junctions
Biological process	cell-cell signaling; positive regulation of GTPase activity; cell adhesion; establishment of endothelial intestinal barrier; signal transduction; regulation of protein localization; adherens junction organization; positive regulation of gene expression; positive regulation of cell-cell adhesion; negative regulation of cell migration; cell-cell adhesion mediated by cadherin; establishment of protein localization to plasma membrane; bicellular tight junction assembly; positive regulation of cell-cell adhesion mediated by cadherin
Sources:Amigo / QuickGO
Orthologs
Databases	NCBI: entry; OMA: entry
Species	Human	Mouse
Entrez	4301	17356
Ensembl	ENSG00000130396	ENSMUSG00000068036
UniProt	P55196	Q9QZQ1
RefSeq (mRNA)	NM_001040000; NM_001040001; NM_001207008; NM_001291964; NM_005936 NM_001366319; NM_001366320; NM_001366321; NM_001386888	NM_010806
RefSeq (protein)	NP_001035089; NP_001193937; NP_001278893; NP_001353248; NP_001353249 NP_001353250	NP_034936
Location (UCSC)	Chr 6: 167.83 – 167.97 Mb	Chr 17: 13.98 – 14.13 Mb
PubMed search
- Wikidata
View/Edit Human	View/Edit Mouse

Afadin is a protein that in humans is encoded by the AFDN gene.

== Function ==
Afadin is a Ras (see HRAS; MIM 190020) target that regulates cell–cell adhesions downstream of Ras activation. It is fused with MLL (MIM 159555) in leukemias caused by t(6;11) translocations (Taya et al., 1998).[supplied by OMIM]

== Interactions ==
Afadin has been shown to interact with:

- BCR gene,
- EPHB3,
- F11 receptor,
- HRAS and
- LMO2,
- PVRL1,
- PVRL3,
- Profilin 1,
- RAP1A,
- RAP1GAP,
- SORBS1,
- SSX2IP,
- Tight junction protein 1, and
- USP9X.
