= Nectin-2 =

Protein found in humans

NECTIN2

Identifiers
- Aliases: NECTIN2, CD112, HVEB, PRR2, PVRR2, PVRL2, nectin cell adhesion molecule 2
- External IDs: OMIM: 600798; MGI: 97822; GeneCards: NECTIN2
Available structures
PDB	Ortholog search: PDBe RCSB
PDB	List of PDB id codes 3R0N, 4DFH, 4DFI, 4HZA

Gene location (Human)
Chr.	Chromosome 19 (human)
Band	19q13.32	Start	44,846,175 bp
Band	19q13.32	End	44,889,223 bp

Gene location (Mouse)
Chr.	Chromosome 7 (mouse)
Band	7 A3|7 9.94 cM	Start	19,450,569 bp
Band	7 A3|7 9.94 cM	End	19,484,408 bp
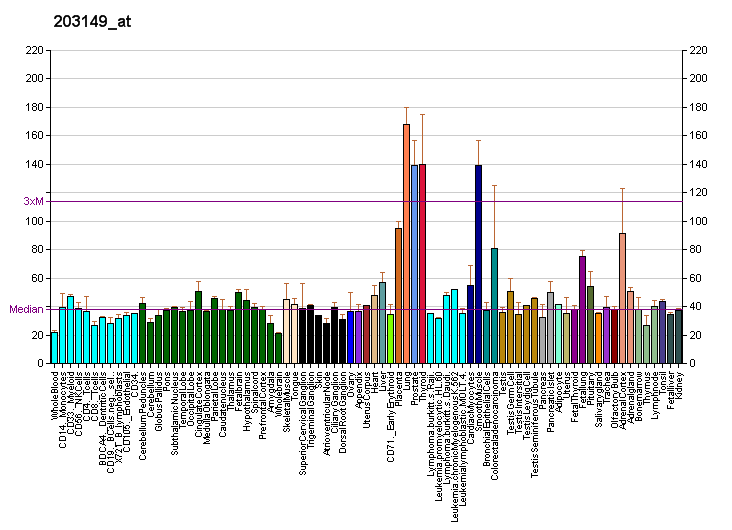
RNA expression pattern
Bgee	Human / Mouse (ortholog); Top expressed in: stromal cell of endometrium; olfactory zone of nasal mucosa; apex of heart; right lobe of liver; gallbladder; right testis; left adrenal cortex; body of stomach; mucosa of transverse colon; upper lobe of left lung / Top expressed in: yolk sac; transitional epithelium of urinary bladder; Ileal epithelium; decidua; gastrula; lumbar spinal ganglion; endothelial cell of lymphatic vessel; duodenum; epiblast; crypt of lieberkuhn of small intestine; More reference expression data
BioGPS	More reference expression data
Gene ontology
Molecular function	coreceptor activity; virus receptor activity; protein binding; identical protein binding; signaling receptor binding; cell adhesion molecule binding; protein heterodimerization activity; protein homodimerization activity
Cellular component	integral component of membrane; membrane; cell-cell junction; focal adhesion; plasma membrane; integral component of plasma membrane; cell surface; zonula adherens; extracellular exosome; apical junction complex; cell-cell contact zone
Biological process	heterophilic cell-cell adhesion via plasma membrane cell adhesion molecules; sperm mitochondrion organization; cell recognition; positive regulation of immunoglobulin mediated immune response; regulation of viral entry into host cell; susceptibility to natural killer cell mediated cytotoxicity; positive regulation of mast cell activation; cell adhesion; acrosome assembly; cytoskeleton organization; positive regulation of natural killer cell mediated cytotoxicity directed against tumor cell target; cilium organization; establishment of mitochondrion localization; spermatid development; regulation of immune response; fertilization; spermatid nucleus differentiation; susceptibility to T cell mediated cytotoxicity; viral process; cell part morphogenesis; adherens junction organization; positive regulation of natural killer cell mediated cytotoxicity; homophilic cell adhesion via plasma membrane adhesion molecules; viral entry into host cell; signal transduction; positive regulation of T cell receptor signaling pathway; virion attachment to host cell
Sources:Amigo / QuickGO
Orthologs
Databases	NCBI: entry; OMA: entry
Species	Human	Mouse
Entrez	5819	19294
Ensembl	ENSG00000130202	ENSMUSG00000062300
UniProt	Q92692	P32507
RefSeq (mRNA)	NM_001042724; NM_002856	NM_001159724; NM_008990
RefSeq (protein)	NP_001036189; NP_002847	NP_001153196; NP_033016
Location (UCSC)	Chr 19: 44.85 – 44.89 Mb	Chr 7: 19.45 – 19.48 Mb
PubMed search
- Wikidata
View/Edit Human	View/Edit Mouse

Nectin-2, also known as Poliovirus receptor-related 2 (PVRL2) and CD112 (formerly herpesvirus entry mediator B, HVEB), is a protein that in humans is encoded by the NECTIN2 gene. It is a plasma membrane glycoprotein.

== Function ==
This gene encodes a single-pass type I membrane glycoprotein with two Ig-like C2-type domains and an Ig-like V-type domain. This protein is one of the plasma membrane components of adherens junctions. It also serves as an entry for certain mutant strains of herpes simplex virus and pseudorabies virus, and it is involved in cell to cell spreading of these viruses. Variations in this gene have been associated with differences in the severity of multiple sclerosis. Alternate transcriptional splice variants, encoding different isoforms, have been characterized.

== See also ==
- Cluster of differentiation
