= AJUBA =

Protein-coding gene in the species Homo sapiens

Identifiers
- Aliases: AJUBA, JUB, ajuba LIM protein
- External IDs: OMIM: 609066; MGI: 1341886; GeneCards: AJUBA

Gene location (Human)
Chr.	Chromosome 14 (human)
Band	14q11.2	Start	22,971,177 bp
Band	14q11.2	End	22,982,551 bp

Gene location (Mouse)
Chr.	Chromosome 14 (mouse)
Band	14|14 C2	Start	54,804,929 bp
Band	14|14 C2	End	54,815,015 bp
RNA expression pattern
Bgee	Human / Mouse (ortholog); Top expressed in: germinal epithelium; skin of arm; ventricular zone; gingival epithelium; skin of thigh; skin of abdomen; amniotic fluid; skin of hip; stromal cell of endometrium; visceral pleura / Top expressed in: molar; somite; endocardial cushion; renal corpuscle; epiblast; primitive streak; external carotid artery; epithelium of lens; abdominal wall; Gonadal ridge; More reference expression data
BioGPS	n/a
Gene ontology
Molecular function	transcription corepressor activity; chromatin binding; metal ion binding; actin filament binding; protein binding; alpha-catenin binding
Cellular component	cytoplasm; membrane; focal adhesion; cell-cell junction; plasma membrane; P-body; microtubule organizing center; cell junction; cytoskeleton; nucleus; lamellipodium; transcription regulator complex; Golgi apparatus; cytosol; adherens junction
Biological process	calcium-dependent cell-cell adhesion via plasma membrane cell adhesion molecules; regulation of cell migration; response to hypoxia; positive regulation of MAP kinase activity; positive regulation of protein-containing complex assembly; regulation of GTPase activity; wound healing, spreading of epidermal cells; positive regulation of kinase activity; positive regulation of cellular biosynthetic process; negative regulation of transcription by RNA polymerase II; transcription, DNA-templated; positive regulation of gene silencing by miRNA; regulation of cellular response to hypoxia; glycerophospholipid biosynthetic process; focal adhesion assembly; cell adhesion; G2/M transition of mitotic cell cycle; gene silencing by miRNA; negative regulation of hippo signaling; positive regulation of I-kappaB kinase/NF-kappaB signaling; cell cycle; gene silencing; lamellipodium assembly; negative regulation of kinase activity; regulation of transcription, DNA-templated; cytoskeleton organization
Sources:Amigo / QuickGO
Orthologs
Databases	NCBI: entry; OMA: entry
Species	Human	Mouse
Entrez	84962	16475
Ensembl	ENSG00000129474	ENSMUSG00000022178
UniProt	Q96IF1	Q91XC0
RefSeq (mRNA)	NM_198086; NM_001289097; NM_032876	NM_010590
RefSeq (protein)	NP_001276026; NP_116265; NP_932352	NP_034720
Location (UCSC)	Chr 14: 22.97 – 22.98 Mb	Chr 14: 54.8 – 54.82 Mb
PubMed search
- Wikidata
View/Edit Human	View/Edit Mouse

LIM domain-containing protein ajuba (or ajuba for short) is a protein that in humans is encoded by the AJUBA gene (previously JUB).

== Function ==
Ajuba contributes to cell fate determination and regulates cell proliferation and differentiation. It plays an important role in the regulation of the kinase activity of AURKA/Aurora-A for mitotic commitment.

== Interactions ==
Ajuba has been shown to interact with Stratifin and SLC1A2.

== Name ==
The protein was first discovered in mice, and named "ajuba" after the Urdu word for "curiosity".
