= P14 deficiency =

Medical condition

P14 deficiency is a rare autosomal recessive disease characterized as a primary immunodeficiency syndrome. This disease was first identified within a white Mennonite family by Professor Bodo Grimbacher and Professor Christoph Klein's teams in 2006. Four out of 15 offspring in this family showed symptoms including short stature, recurrent infection of Streptococcus pneumoniae (a typical sign for immunodeficiency), and dysfunction of cells that contain specific lysosome-related organelles, including cytotoxic T cells, melanocytes, and neutrophil granulocytes.

After linkage analysis and transcriptional profiling, researchers successfully linked this syndrome with a mutation that can downregulate the LAMTOR2 gene on chromosome. LAMTOR2 gene is responsible for encoding the late endosomal-lysosomal MEK binding partner 1 (MP-1)-interacting protein, also known as p14, which serves as an adaptor protein on the surface membrane of late endosomes. It plays a vital role in regulating the MAPK/ERK signaling pathway and lysosomal biogenesis. Thus, p14 deficiency mainly affects those cells, where the MAPK/ERK signaling and lysosomes/lysosome-related organelles are strongly required for normal function.

The p14 deficiency can be accurately diagnosed by sequencing the LAMTOR2 gene, but currently, there is no cure for p14 deficiency. The treatment plans are symptom-based, including antibiotics to target acute bacterial infection and G-CSF to stimulate the neutrophils' growth to improve patients' immunity against pathogens.

== Signs and symptoms ==
The p14 deficiency will impair the MAPK/ERK signaling pathway, essential for cell proliferation responding to growth factors. Thus, a reduction in cell counts for some types of cells should be observed. Meanwhile, the lysosome biogenesis is also impaired, affecting those cells that contain specific lysosome-related organelles, like melanocytes, cytotoxic T cells, and neutrophils. Consequently, we might expect an impairment of normal function among those cells.

=== Immunodeficiency ===
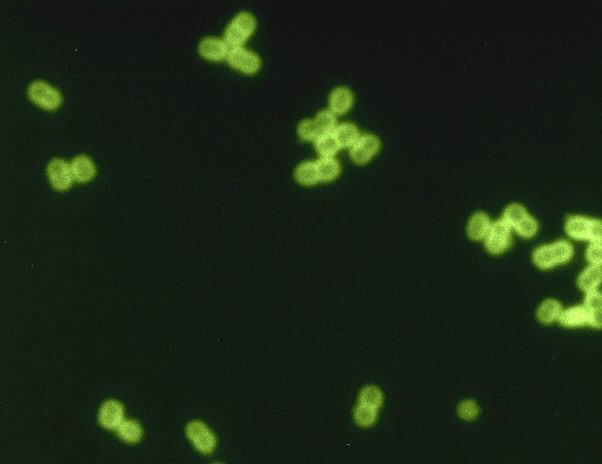
Streptococcus pneumoniae under the microscope.

Like other primary immunodeficiency syndromes, patients with p14 deficiency are prone to infection due to impaired immune systems, for example, the recurrent bronchopulmonary infection caused by Streptococcus pneumoniae. Abnormalities can also be observed among three major types of immune cells.

Firstly, all patients show severe neutropenia (ANC < 500/ul) due to impaired response towards granulocyte colony-stimulating factor receptor (G-CSFR). Furthermore, the efficiency of patients' neutrophils to digest bacteria is strongly hindered, even though the phagocytosis process is unaffected. The underlying reason is the impairment of azurophilic granules, the lysosome-related organelles responsible for the lysis of bacteria.

Secondly, the decreased cytotoxic activity of CD8^{+} T cells is observed, even though the cell counts of both CD4^{+} and CD8^{+} T cells are not affected. The decrease in cytotoxicity might also be linked to the impaired lysosome function, impeding the efficient release of cytotoxic protein to kill the pathogens.

Thirdly, the percentage of naive B cells increases in the blood, accompanied by a decrease in IgD^{+} IgM^{+} CD27^{+} memory B cells, IgD^{−} IgM^{−} CD27^{+} class-switched memory B cells, and IgA^{+} B cells. This indicates the B-cell maturation might be impaired. Reduced serum IgM levels should also be observed. In addition, half of the patients may also show reduced serum IgG levels, indicating short-term and long-term antibody responses against infection are both impaired.

=== Other symptoms ===
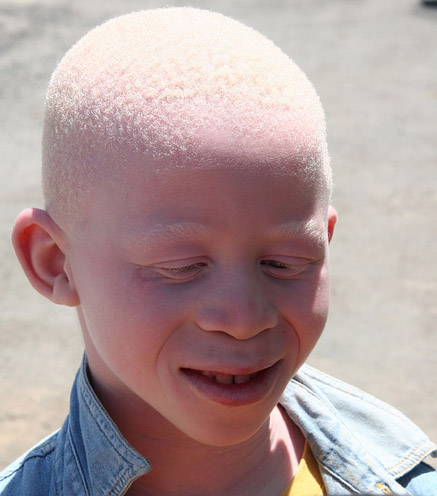
A child with hypopigmentation

Beyond immunodeficiency, patients with p14 deficiency also show hypopigmentation and short stature. Hypopigmentation is caused by the dysfunction of the melanosome, a lysosome-related organelle in melanocytes, which is responsible for the synthesis and secretion of melanin (the pigments that color hair, skin, and retina). Under the transmission electron microscope (TEM), an accumulation of immature melanosomes can be observed. Moreover, those melanosomes are immediately degraded when transferring into basal keratinocytes, the cellular component of the outmost layer of the skin. Thus, p14 deficiency patients will show an abnormally light coloring of the skin, hair, and eyes.

The above symptoms are shared with other genetic diseases that can cause lysosomal defects, like Chediak–Higashi syndrome, Hermansky–Pudlak syndrome type 2, and Griscelli syndrome type 2. However, short stature is only observed among p14 deficiency patients. As the MAPK/ERK signaling played an essential role in skeletal development and hemostasis, we may expect p14 deficiency can impair the normal skeletal growth, contributing to the short stature phenotype.

== Discovery and linkage analysis ==
P14 deficiency was first identified within a white Mennonite family, where 4 out of 12 offspring of two unaffected parents showed the above symptoms. This kind of inheritance pattern (offsprings affected while parents remained unaffected) indicated that p14 deficiency is an autosomal recessive disorder. In addition, white Mennonite is a religious isolate with a tradition of inbreeding. Marriage between genetically closely related individuals will decrease the heterozygosity, increasing the risks of autosomal recessive disorders. With the inheritance pattern and background information, scientists hypothesized an autosomal recessive mutation causes p14 deficiency.

In order to identify the exact location of the mutation, researchers performed linkage analysis. In total, 4 genetic markers on chromosome 1, including D1S498, D1S2346, D1S305, and D1S1153 segregated perfectly, indicating the linkage region. 192 genes were flanking this region, so the genome-wide transcriptional profiling was employed to narrow down the target. Among all the 192 genes, gene expression abnormalities (under-expression) were only observed for the LAMTOR2 gene, the gene encoding the p14 protein. Thus, this disease is highly likely to be caused a mutation related to the LAMTOR2 gene.

== Causes ==
A point mutation from cytidine to adenosine was observed in the 3′ untranslated region (UTR) of the LAMTOR2 gene at the +23 position from the lower exon boundary. The 3′ UTR, especially the poly(A) tail, plays a vital role in RNA processing, including maintenance of RNA stability and mediation of RNA transportation and translation. A point mutation near a gene may also create an alternative RNA splice site, resulting in a different transcript. By now, research has shown this point mutation can lead to a significant reduction in LAMTOR2 mRNA stability, which will decrease the translation of p14 protein, leading to p14 deficiency. Further studies can be conducted for a more detailed underlying mechanism and exclude other possibilities in the future.

Diagram showing an overview of EGF-induced MAPK/ERK signaling pathway. After receiving the EGF signals, Ras will be activated, which will then transduce to Raf-kinase, MEK (MEK1 or MEK2), and finally, ERK (also known as MAPK). As MAPK can only be activated when MP1 is present and properly localized, p14 deficiency will lead to malfunctions of MAPK/ERK signaling pathway.

== Pathophysiology ==
=== Effects on MAPK/ERK signaling ===
MAPK/ERK pathway is one of the most important signaling pathways in cells responsible for cell proliferation in response to the epidermal growth factor (EGF) stimulation. Research has shown p14 adaptor protein is crucial for the proper localization of MP1 protein, a scaffold protein important for the normal transduction of the MAPK/ERK pathway by facilitating the activation of MAPK by MEK1. In fact, p14 functions as an adaptor protein for MP1, ensuring the proper attachment of MP1 to the endosomal membrane. Although the activation of MAPK by MEK1 can happen on either the plasma membrane or the endosomal membrane, the major pathway is mediated by MP1 and can only occur in the endosomal membrane. During the signaling process, p14 protein will recruit the MP1 protein to the endosomal membrane, and the MP1 protein will then be able to recruit MEK1 for MAPK activation. Without p14 protein, the MP1-MAPK- signaling module will not be able to localize to late endosomes, hindering MAPK activation. In the cells with down-regulated p14 levels (mimic the p14 deficiency patients' cells), the phosphorylation of RSK (downstream products of activated MAPK) is significantly declined after EGF stimulation, indicating the decrease in activated MAPK level.

This can explain why short stature is observed in p14 deficiency patients, as EGF-induced cell proliferation and ERK signaling pathways are central to bone development. Besides, the growth factor specific for neutrophil proliferation, granulocyte colony-stimulating factor receptor (G-CSFR), also functions through the same signaling pathway. Upon G-CSFR stimulation, the p14-deficient neutrophils show a significantly lower MAPK phosphorylation (activation) level, indicating declined G-CSFR-induced MAPK signaling. This will affect the proliferation of neutrophils, explaining the neutropenia observed in p14 deficiency patients.

=== Effects on lysosome-related organelles biogenesis ===
P14 protein is also essential for the proper localization of late endosomes during the lysosome biogenesis. After endocytosis occurs, early endosomes will mature to late endosomes which will travel towards the peri-nuclear space, where most of the lysosomes locate. After reaching the perinuclear space, endosomes will fuse with the lysosomes to form endolysosome, responsible for the digestion of endocytosed compounds. Besides delivering endocytosed compounds, late endosomes also transport important components from the trans-Golgi network (TGN) to lysosomes for lysosomal biogenesis, including LAMPs.

In p14 deficiency cells, the average peri-nuclear distance of late-endosomes increases, indicating most of the late-endosomes cannot travel to the peri-nuclear space to fuse with lysosomes. Without important lysosomal components, lysosomal biogenesis and regeneration will be strongly hindered. Thus, we can expect this type of late-endosomal configuration destruction can also be observed among p14 deficiency patients. This can explain why those cells containing specific lysosome-related organelles lose their function in p14 deficiency patients, leading to hypopigmentation and a decrease in T-cell cytotoxicity. It is also consistent with the inefficient digestion observed in p14 deficiency patients' neutrophils. During engulfment of bacteria, an endosome will form to bring the bacterial debris to lysosomes for digestion and elimination. As the endosomal movement is strongly hindered, a decrease in bacterial digestion efficiency must be observed.

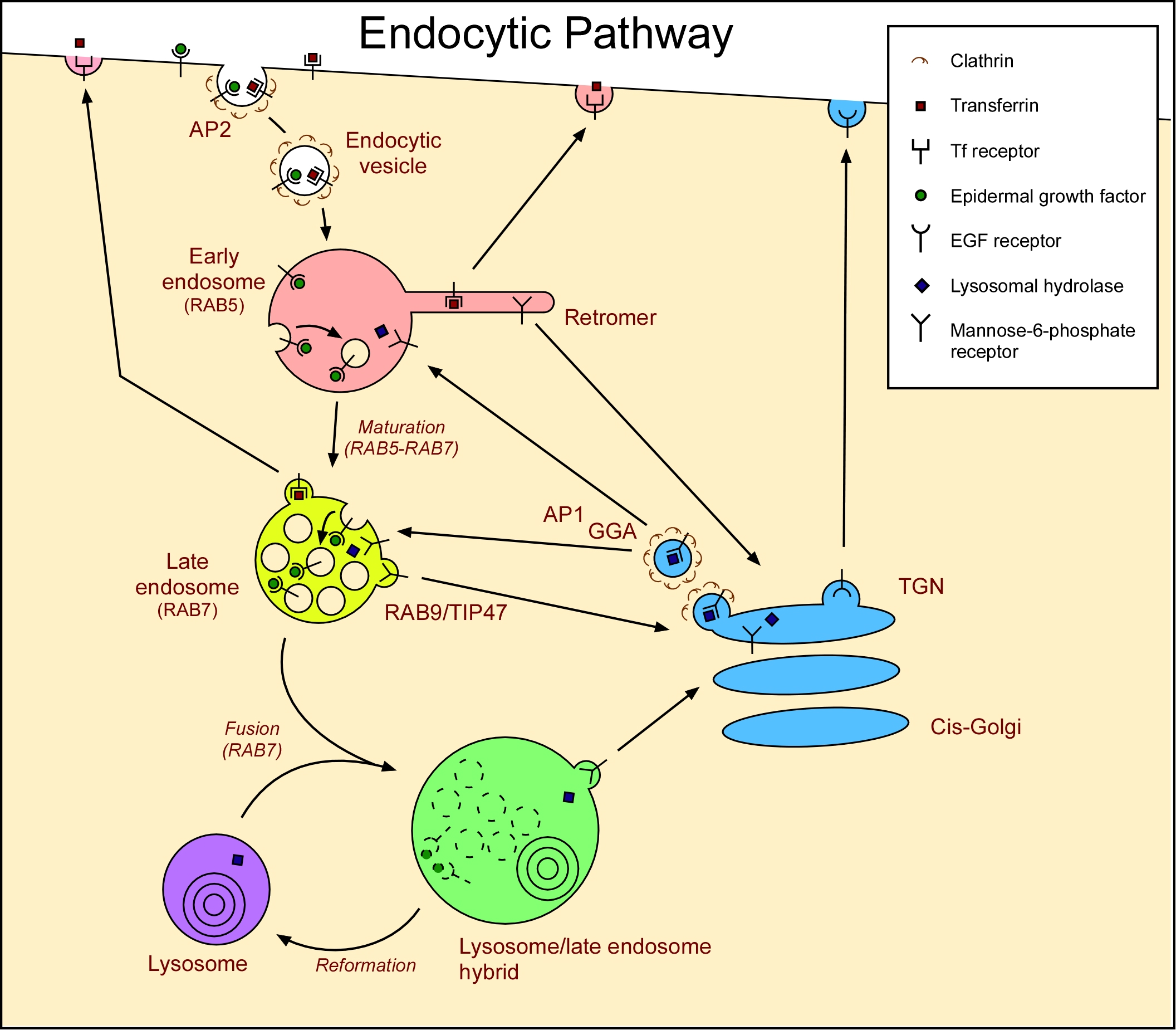
The interaction between endosomes and lysosomes. Endosomes will not only bring the waste (like bacteria) to lysosomes but also transport the important components to lysosomes for biogenesis.

== Diagnosis ==
=== Symptom-based diagnosis ===
Lysosome secretion defects, short stature, and primary immunodeficiency syndrome can be the three prominent symptoms used for diagnosis, in which short stature can be used to distinguish the p14 deficiency from other lysosomal storage diseases. Pedigree analysis can also be used to confirm the autosomal recessive inheritance pattern. However, the ultimate confirmation should be based on genetic screenings.

=== Genetic test ===
Whole-exome sequencing can be used to screen the mutation related to LAMTOR2 gene. Although, for p14 deficiency patients, the mutation locates in the 3′ UTR region instead of the exon region, the whole-exome sequencing technology can still be used, as the recent whole-exome sequencing has already extended its targets to include some critical 3′ UTR regions.

== Treatment ==
There is no specific treatment for p14 deficiency. All treatments aim to relieve the symptoms instead of the disease. Antibiotics, like amoxicillin, can be used to treat Streptococcus pneumoniae infection, while G-CSF can stimulate neutrophils' growth. Intravenous immunoglobulin (IVIG) therapy can also be used among those patients with low serum IgG and IgM levels. Nowadays, as more and more drugs are developed to directly target the loss-of-function genetic mutation, we can expect a drug targeting p14 deficiency to be developed in the future.
