= MKNK =

MKNK may refer to:

- MKNK1, a human protein-coding gene
- MKNK2, a human protein-coding gene
- MkNk, a rare blood type of MN blood group system
