= MAP2K1 =

Protein-coding gene in the species Homo sapiens

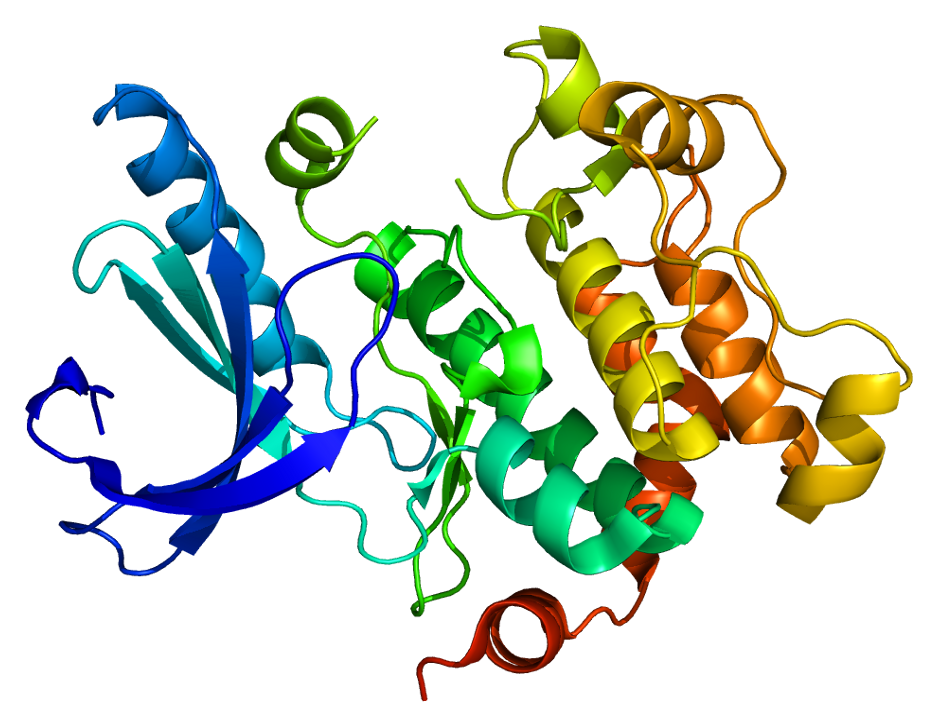

Identifiers
- Aliases: MAP2K1, CFC3, MAPKK1, MEK1, MKK1, PRKMK1, mitogen-activated protein kinase kinase 1, MEL
- External IDs: OMIM: 176872; MGI: 1346866; GeneCards: MAP2K1
Available structures
PDB	Ortholog search: PDBe RCSB
PDB	List of PDB id codes 1S9J, 2P55, 3DV3, 3DY7, 3E8N, 3EQB, 3EQC, 3EQD, 3EQF, 3EQG, 3EQH, 3EQI, 3MBL, 3ORN, 3OS3, 3PP1, 3SLS, 3V01, 3V04, 3VVH, 3W8Q, 3WIG, 3ZLS, 3ZLW, 3ZLX, 3ZLY, 3ZM4, 4AN2, 4AN3, 4AN9, 4ANB, 4ARK, 4LMN, 4MNE, 4U7Z, 4U80, 4U81, 5BX0
Enzyme activity
EC #	BRENDA	ExPASy	KEGG	MetaCyc
2.7.12.2	↗	↗	↗	↗

Gene location (Human)
Chr.	Chromosome 15 (human)
Band	15q22.31	Start	66,386,837 bp
Band	15q22.31	End	66,491,656 bp

Gene location (Mouse)
Chr.	Chromosome 9 (mouse)
Band	9 C|9 34.55 cM	Start	64,093,052 bp
Band	9 C|9 34.55 cM	End	64,160,913 bp
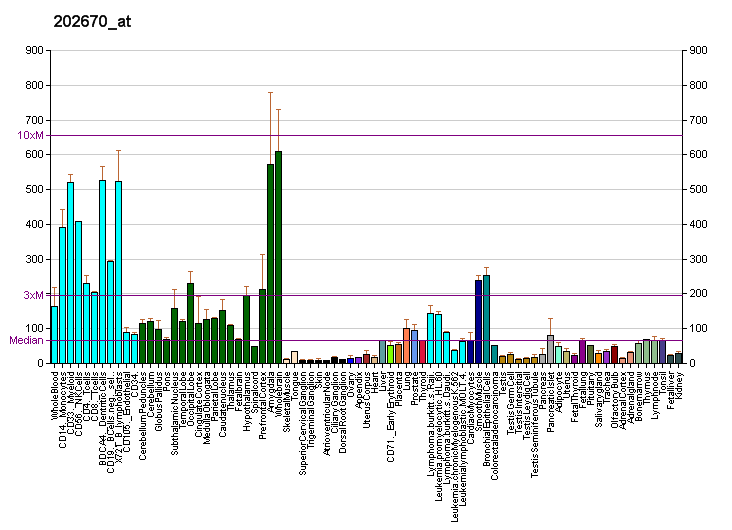
RNA expression pattern
Bgee	Human / Mouse (ortholog); Top expressed in: secondary oocyte; orbitofrontal cortex; prefrontal cortex; postcentral gyrus; Brodmann area 46; Brodmann area 9; superior frontal gyrus; nucleus accumbens; Skeletal muscle tissue of rectus abdominis; cingulate gyrus / Top expressed in: dentate gyrus of hippocampal formation granule cell; olfactory tubercle; nucleus accumbens; superior frontal gyrus; zygote; hippocampus proper; secondary oocyte; temporal lobe; amygdala; primary visual cortex; More reference expression data
BioGPS	More reference expression data
Gene ontology
Molecular function	protein N-terminus binding; kinase activity; protein C-terminus binding; ATP binding; transferase activity; protein serine/threonine kinase activator activity; protein binding; protein serine/threonine/tyrosine kinase activity; protein tyrosine kinase activity; nucleotide binding; MAP kinase kinase activity; protein kinase activity; protein serine/threonine kinase activity; scaffold protein binding
Cellular component	membrane; focal adhesion; microtubule organizing center; mitochondrion; cytoskeleton; nucleus; endoplasmic reticulum; late endosome; Golgi apparatus; early endosome; cytoplasm; cytosol; plasma membrane
Biological process	regulation of protein phosphorylation; positive regulation of axonogenesis; positive regulation of protein serine/threonine kinase activity; cellular senescence; face development; cerebellar cortex formation; negative regulation of cell population proliferation; thymus development; cell motility; negative regulation of gene expression; development of the heart; positive regulation of cell differentiation; regulation of stress-activated MAPK cascade; phosphorylation; epithelial cell proliferation involved in lung morphogenesis; chemotaxis; thyroid gland development; neuron differentiation; trachea formation; regulation of axon regeneration; lung morphogenesis; regulation of early endosome to late endosome transport; labyrinthine layer development; placenta blood vessel development; keratinocyte differentiation; MAPK cascade; positive regulation of gene expression; Bergmann glial cell differentiation; peptidyl-tyrosine phosphorylation; regulation of Golgi inheritance; signal transduction; positive regulation of production of miRNAs involved in gene silencing by miRNA; positive regulation of ERK1 and ERK2 cascade; positive regulation of transcription, DNA-templated; regulation of mitotic cell cycle; regulation of apoptotic process; protein phosphorylation; peptidyl-threonine phosphorylation; ERK1 and ERK2 cascade; stress-activated protein kinase signaling cascade; activation of protein kinase activity
Sources:Amigo / QuickGO
Orthologs
Databases	NCBI: entry; OMA: entry
Species	Human	Mouse
Entrez	5604	26395
Ensembl	ENSG00000169032	ENSMUSG00000004936
UniProt	Q02750	P31938
RefSeq (mRNA)	NM_002755	NM_008927
RefSeq (protein)	NP_002746	NP_032953
Location (UCSC)	Chr 15: 66.39 – 66.49 Mb	Chr 9: 64.09 – 64.16 Mb
PubMed search
- Wikidata
View/Edit Human	View/Edit Mouse

Dual specificity mitogen-activated protein kinase kinase 1 is an enzyme that in humans is encoded by the MAP2K1 gene.

== Function ==
The protein encoded by this gene is a member of the dual-specificity protein kinase family that acts as a mitogen-activated protein (MAP) kinase kinase. MAP kinases, also known as extracellular signal-regulated kinases (ERKs), act as an integration point for multiple biochemical signals. This protein kinase lies upstream of MAP kinases and stimulates the enzymatic activity of MAP kinases upon activation by a wide variety of extra- and intracellular signals. As an essential component of the MAP kinase signal transduction pathway, this kinase is involved in many cellular processes such as proliferation, differentiation, transcription regulation and development. MAP2K1 is altered in 1.05% of all human cancers.

== Meiosis ==
The genomes of diploid organisms in natural populations are highly polymorphic for insertions and deletions. During meiosis double-strand breaks (DSBs) that form within such polymorphic regions must be repaired by inter-sister chromatid exchange, rather than by inter-homolog exchange. Molecular-level studies of recombination during budding yeast meiosis have shown that recombination events initiated by DSBs in regions that lack corresponding sequences in the homolog are efficiently repaired by inter-sister chromatid recombination. This recombination occurs with the same timing as inter-homolog recombination, but with reduced (2- to 3-fold) yields of joint molecules.

MAP2K1 is also known as MEK1 (see Mitogen-activated protein kinase kinase). MEK1 is a meiotic chromosome-axis-associated kinase that is thought to slow down, but not entirely block, sister chromatid recombination. Loss of MEK1 allows inter-sister DSB repair and also inter-sister Holliday junction intermediates to increase. Despite the normal activity of MEK1 in reducing inter-sister chromatid recombination, such recombination still occurs frequently during normal budding yeast meiosis (although not as frequently as during mitosis), and up to one-third of all recombination events are between sister chromatids.

== Interactions ==
MAP2K1 has been shown to interact with C-Raf, Phosphatidylethanolamine binding protein 1, MAP2K1IP1, GRB10, MAPK3, MAPK8IP3, MAPK1 MP1, and MAP3K1.
