= RPS6KA2 =

Enzyme found in humans

Identifiers
- Aliases: RPS6KA2, HU-2, MAPKAPK1C, RSK, RSK3, S6K-alpha, S6K-alpha2, p90-RSK3, pp90RSK3, p90RSK2, ribosomal protein S6 kinase A2
- External IDs: OMIM: 601685; MGI: 1342290; GeneCards: RPS6KA2
Enzyme activity
EC #	BRENDA	ExPASy	KEGG	MetaCyc
2.7.11.1	↗	↗	↗	↗

Gene location (Human)
Chr.	Chromosome 6 (human)
Band	6q27	Start	166,409,364 bp
Band	6q27	End	166,906,451 bp

Gene location (Mouse)
Chr.	Chromosome 17 (mouse)
Band	17 A1|17 4.7 cM	Start	7,437,514 bp
Band	17 A1|17 4.7 cM	End	7,570,714 bp
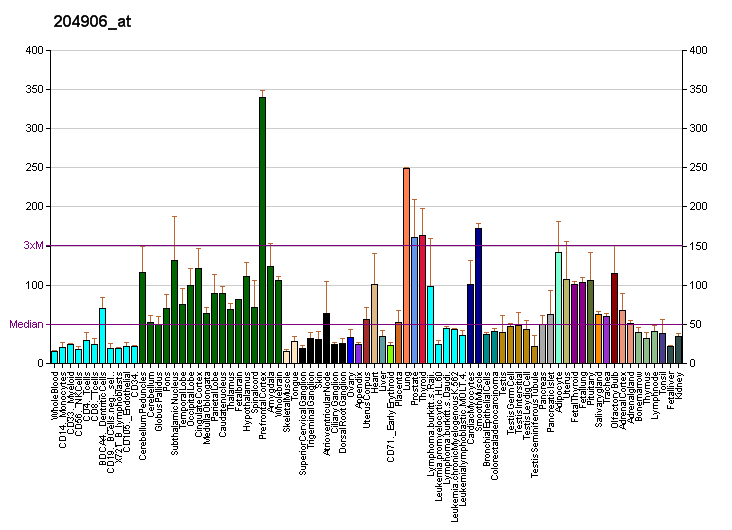

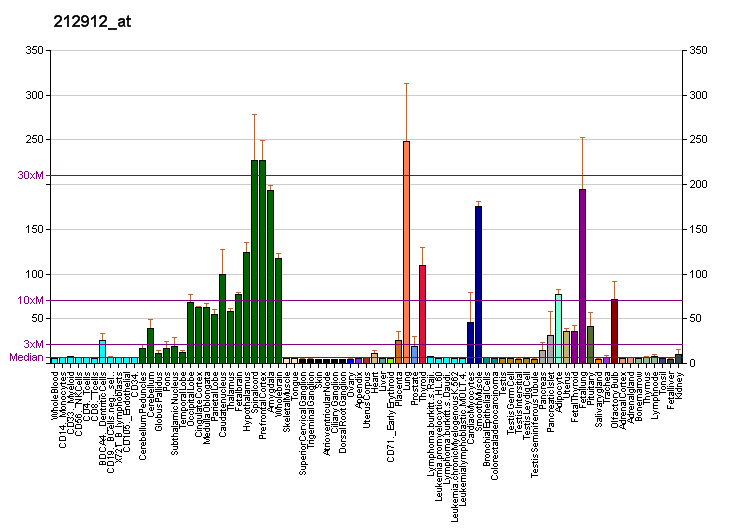
RNA expression pattern
Bgee	Human / Mouse (ortholog); Top expressed in: inferior olivary nucleus; lower lobe of lung; internal globus pallidus; dorsal motor nucleus of vagus nerve; inferior ganglion of vagus nerve; C1 segment; optic nerve; right lung; corpus callosum; superior vestibular nucleus / Top expressed in: granulocyte; muscle of thigh; neural layer of retina; tail of embryo; superior frontal gyrus; dentate gyrus of hippocampal formation granule cell; primary visual cortex; genital tubercle; lens; ventricular zone; More reference expression data
BioGPS	More reference expression data
Gene ontology
Molecular function	transferase activity; nucleotide binding; protein kinase activity; metal ion binding; protein binding; protein serine/threonine/tyrosine kinase activity; ATP binding; magnesium ion binding; kinase activity; protein serine/threonine kinase activity; ribosomal protein S6 kinase activity
Cellular component	cytoplasm; cytosol; nucleoplasm; nucleus
Biological process	phosphorylation; negative regulation of cell cycle; protein phosphorylation; positive regulation of apoptotic process; negative regulation of cell population proliferation; signal transduction; intracellular signal transduction
Sources:Amigo / QuickGO
Orthologs
Databases	NCBI: entry; OMA: entry
Species	Human	Mouse
Entrez	6196	20112
Ensembl	ENSG00000071242	ENSMUSG00000023809
UniProt	Q15349	Q9WUT3
RefSeq (mRNA)	NM_001006932; NM_021135; NM_001318936; NM_001318937; NM_001318938	NM_011299
RefSeq (protein)	NP_001006933; NP_001305865; NP_001305866; NP_001305867; NP_066958	NP_035429
Location (UCSC)	Chr 6: 166.41 – 166.91 Mb	Chr 17: 7.44 – 7.57 Mb
PubMed search
- Wikidata
View/Edit Human	View/Edit Mouse

Ribosomal protein S6 kinase alpha-2 is an enzyme that in humans is encoded by the RPS6KA2 gene.

This gene encodes a member of the RSK (ribosomal S6 kinase) family of serine and threonine kinases. This kinase contains 2 non-identical kinase catalytic domains and phosphorylates various substrates, including members of the mitogen-activated kinase (MAPK) signalling pathway. The activity of this protein has been implicated in controlling cell growth and differentiation. Alternate transcriptional splice variants, encoding different isoforms, have been characterized.

== Interactions ==
RPS6KA2 has been shown to interact with MAPK3 and MAPK1.
