= SPIB =

Protein that controls transcription of a set of genes in eukaryotes

Identifiers
- Aliases: SPIB, SPI-B, Spi-B transcription factor
- External IDs: OMIM: 606802; MGI: 892986; GeneCards: SPIB

Gene location (Human)
Chr.	Chromosome 19 (human)
Band	19q13.33	Start	50,418,938 bp
Band	19q13.33	End	50,431,314 bp

Gene location (Mouse)
Chr.	Chromosome 7 (mouse)
Band	7 B3|7 28.83 cM	Start	44,175,417 bp
Band	7 B3|7 28.83 cM	End	44,181,495 bp
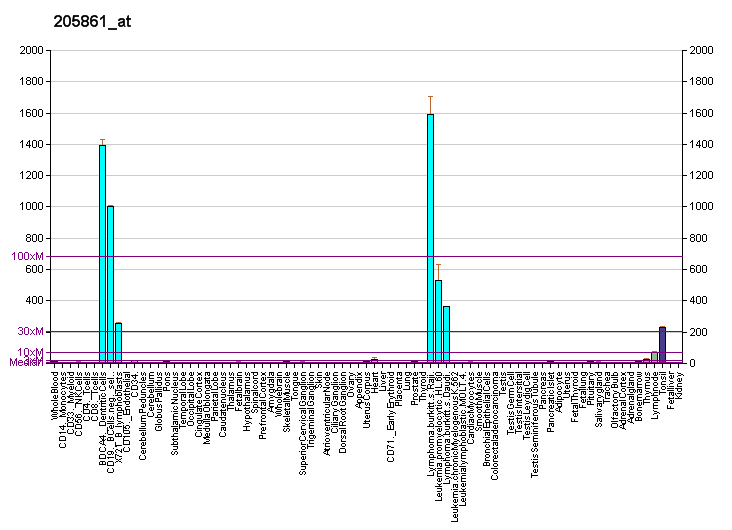
RNA expression pattern
Bgee	Human / Mouse (ortholog); Top expressed in: lymph node; mucosa of transverse colon; appendix; granulocyte; buccal mucosa cell; spleen; rectum; mucosa of ileum; epithelium of nasopharynx; blood / Top expressed in: mesenteric lymph nodes; spleen; tibiofemoral joint; blood; granulocyte; subcutaneous adipose tissue; submandibular gland; bone marrow; thymus; femur; More reference expression data
BioGPS	More reference expression data
Gene ontology
Molecular function	DNA-binding transcription factor activity; sequence-specific DNA binding; DNA binding; RNA polymerase II cis-regulatory region sequence-specific DNA binding; DNA-binding transcription activator activity, RNA polymerase II-specific; DNA-binding transcription factor activity, RNA polymerase II-specific
Cellular component	cytoplasm; nucleus
Biological process	regulation of transcription by RNA polymerase II; cell differentiation; regulation of transcription, DNA-templated; transcription, DNA-templated; transcription by RNA polymerase II; positive regulation of transcription by RNA polymerase II
Sources:Amigo / QuickGO
Orthologs
Databases	NCBI: entry; OMA: entry
Species	Human	Mouse
Entrez	6689	272382
Ensembl	ENSG00000269404	ENSMUSG00000008193
UniProt	Q01892	O35906
RefSeq (mRNA)	NM_003121; NM_001243998; NM_001243999; NM_001244000	NM_019866
RefSeq (protein)	NP_001230927; NP_001230928; NP_001230929; NP_003112	NP_063919
Location (UCSC)	Chr 19: 50.42 – 50.43 Mb	Chr 7: 44.18 – 44.18 Mb
PubMed search
- Wikidata
View/Edit Human	View/Edit Mouse

Transcription factor Spi-B is a protein that in humans is encoded by the SPIB gene.

== Function ==
SPI1 (MIM 165170) and SPIB are members of a subfamily of ETS (see ETS1; MIM 164720) transcription factors. ETS proteins share a conserved ETS domain that mediates specific DNA binding. SPIB and SPI1 bind to a purine-rich sequence, the PU box (5-prime-GAGGAA-3-prime).[supplied by OMIM]

== Interactions ==
SPIB has been shown to interact with MAPK3 and MAPK8.
