= MAPK1 =

Protein-coding gene in humans

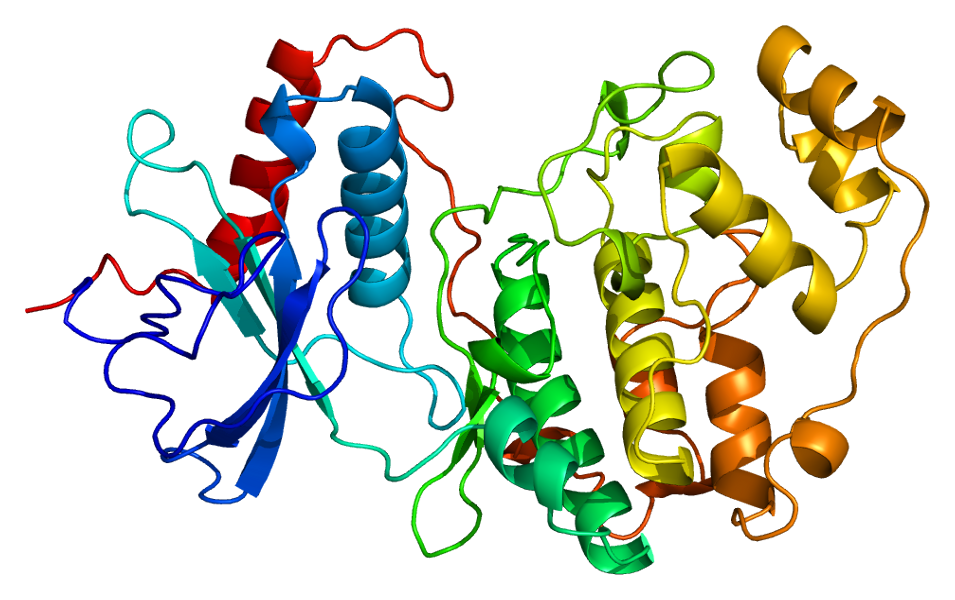

Identifiers
- Aliases: MAPK1, ERK, ERK-2, ERK2, ERT1, MAPK2, P42MAPK, PRKM1, PRKM2, p38, p40, p41, p41mapk, p42-MAPK, mitogen-activated protein kinase 1, NS13
- External IDs: OMIM: 176948; MGI: 1346858; GeneCards: MAPK1
Available structures
| PDB | Ortholog search: PDBe RCSB |
| PDB | List of PDB id codes 1PME, 1TVO, 1WZY, 2OJG, 2OJI, 2OJJ, 2Y9Q, 3D42, 3D44, 3I5Z, 3I60, 3SA0, 3TEI, 3W55, 4FMQ, 4FUX, 4FUY, 4FV0, 4FV1, 4FV2, 4FV3, 4FV4, 4FV5, 4FV6, 4FV7, 4FV8, 4FV9, 4G6N, 4G6O, 4H3P, 4H3Q, 4IZ5, 4IZ7, 4IZA, 4N0S, 4NIF, 4O6E, 4QTA, 4QTE, 4ZZM, 4ZZN, 4ZZO, 5BUE, 5BUI, 5BUJ, 4QP1, 4QP2, 4QP3, 4QP4, 4QP6, 4QP7, 4QP8, 4QP9, 4QPA, 4XJ0, 5BVD, 5BVE, 5BVF, 5AX3, 4ZXT, 5K4I |
Enzyme activity
| EC # | BRENDA | ExPASy | KEGG | MetaCyc |
|---|---|---|---|---|
| 2.7.11.24 | ↗ | ↗ | ↗ | ↗ |

Gene location (Human)
| Chr. | Chromosome 22 (human) |
| Band | 22q11.22 | Start | 21,759,657 bp |
| Band | 22q11.22 | End | 21,867,680 bp |

Gene location (Mouse)
| Chr. | Chromosome 16 (mouse) |
| Band | 16 A3|16 10.53 cM | Start | 16,801,246 bp |
| Band | 16 A3|16 10.53 cM | End | 16,865,317 bp |
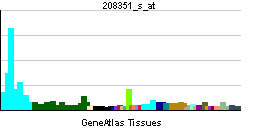

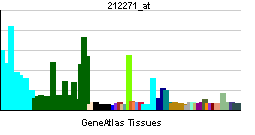
RNA expression pattern
| Bgee | Human / Mouse (ortholog); Top expressed in: middle temporal gyrus; postcentral gyrus; Brodmann area 23; entorhinal cortex; superior frontal gyrus; external globus pallidus; pons; visceral pleura; skin of thigh; skin of hip / Top expressed in: dentate gyrus of hippocampal formation granule cell; olfactory tubercle; superior frontal gyrus; primary visual cortex; entorhinal cortex; perirhinal cortex; hippocampus proper; CA3 field; amygdala; anterior amygdaloid area; More reference expression data |
| BioGPS | More reference expression data |
Gene ontology
| Molecular function | phosphatase binding; ATP binding; protein kinase activity; transcription factor binding; transferase activity; mitogen-activated protein kinase kinase kinase binding; phosphotyrosine residue binding; protein binding; protein kinase binding; DNA binding; nucleotide binding; RNA polymerase II CTD heptapeptide repeat kinase activity; protein serine/threonine kinase activity; kinase activity; identical protein binding; MAP kinase activity; double-stranded DNA binding; MAP kinase kinase activity |
| Cellular component | cytoplasm; cytosol; focal adhesion; microtubule organizing center; mitochondrion; caveola; dendrite cytoplasm; cytoskeleton; nucleus; extracellular exosome; perikaryon; late endosome; Golgi apparatus; spindle; axon; early endosome; mitotic spindle; pseudopodium; extracellular region; nucleoplasm; azurophil granule lumen; ficolin-1-rich granule lumen; plasma membrane; postsynaptic density; membrane; protein-containing complex |
| Biological process | caveolin-mediated endocytosis; positive regulation of telomere capping; response to exogenous dsRNA; cardiac neural crest cell development involved in heart development; positive regulation of translation; cellular response to DNA damage stimulus; platelet activation; Fc-epsilon receptor signaling pathway; protein phosphorylation; face development; cellular response to granulocyte macrophage colony-stimulating factor stimulus; regulation of DNA-binding transcription factor activity; animal organ morphogenesis; cell cycle; ERBB signaling pathway; apoptotic process; B cell receptor signaling pathway; regulation of transcription, DNA-templated; regulation of protein stability; Fc-gamma receptor signaling pathway involved in phagocytosis; thymus development; negative regulation of cell differentiation; ERK1 and ERK2 cascade; labyrinthine layer blood vessel development; transcription, DNA-templated; positive regulation of transcription, DNA-templated; development of the heart; viral process; response to toxic substance; regulation of stress-activated MAPK cascade; chemical synaptic transmission; growth hormone receptor signaling pathway via JAK-STAT; cytosine metabolic process; phosphorylation; outer ear morphogenesis; response to estrogen; chemotaxis; response to lipopolysaccharide; thyroid gland development; response to epidermal growth factor; positive regulation of telomerase activity; sensory perception of pain; peptidyl-threonine phosphorylation; trachea formation; lipopolysaccharide-mediated signaling pathway; mammary gland epithelial cell proliferation; intracellular signal transduction; lung morphogenesis; neural crest cell development; positive regulation of cell migration; regulation of early endosome to late endosome transport; response to stress; positive regulation of telomere maintenance via telomerase; MAPK cascade; axon guidance; fibroblast growth factor receptor signaling pathway; positive regulation of peptidyl-threonine phosphorylation; peptidyl-serine phosphorylation; positive regulation of cell population proliferation; regulation of cellular response to heat; Bergmann glial cell differentiation; regulation of Golgi inheritance; T cell receptor signaling pathway; regulation of cytoskeleton organization; signal transduction; long-term potentiation; regulation of ossification; regulation of phosphatidylinositol 3-kinase signaling; neutrophil degranulation; regulation of gene expression; cellular response to organic substance; ageing; learning or memory; positive regulation of gene expression; diadenosine tetraphosphate biosynthetic process; regulation of cellular pH; cellular response to amino acid starvation; cellular response to reactive oxygen species; response to nicotine; decidualization; stress-activated MAPK cascade; positive regulation of cardiac muscle cell proliferation; cellular response to cadmium ion; cellular response to tumor necrosis factor; cellular response to dopamine; positive regulation of protein import into nucleus |
Sources:Amigo / QuickGO
Orthologs
| Databases | NCBI: entry; OMA: entry |
| Species | Human | Mouse |
| Entrez | 5594 | 26413 |
| Ensembl | ENSG00000100030 | ENSMUSG00000063358 |
| UniProt | P28482 | P63085 |
| RefSeq (mRNA) | NM_138957; NM_002745 | NM_001038663; NM_011949; NM_001357115; NM_028991 |
| RefSeq (protein) | NP_002736; NP_620407 | NP_001033752; NP_036079; NP_001344044 |
| Location (UCSC) | Chr 22: 21.76 – 21.87 Mb | Chr 16: 16.8 – 16.87 Mb |
| PubMed search |
- Wikidata
| View/Edit Human | View/Edit Mouse |

Mitogen-activated protein kinase 1 (MAPK 1), also known as ERK2, is an enzyme that in humans is encoded by the MAPK1 gene.

== Function ==
The protein encoded by this gene is a member of the MAP kinase family. MAP kinases, also known as extracellular signal-regulated kinases (ERKs), act as an integration point for multiple biochemical signals, and are involved in a wide variety of cellular processes such as proliferation, differentiation, transcription regulation and development. The activation of this kinase requires its phosphorylation by upstream kinases. Upon activation, this kinase translocates to the nucleus of the stimulated cells, where it phosphorylates nuclear targets. Two alternatively spliced transcript variants encoding the same protein, but differing in the UTRs, have been reported for this gene. MAPK1 contains multiple amino acid sites that are phosphorylated and ubiquitinated.

== Interactions ==
MAPK1 has been shown to interact with:

- ADAM17,
- CIITA,
- DUSP1,
- DUSP3,
- ELK1,
- FHL2,
- HDAC4,
- MAP2K1,
- MAP3K1
- MAPK14,
- MKNK1,
- MKNK2,
- Myc,
- NEK2,
- PEA15,
- PTPN7,
- Phosphatidylethanolamine binding protein 1,
- RPS6KA1,
- RPS6KA2,
- RPS6KA3,
- SORBS3,
- STAT5A,
- TNIP1,
- TOB1,
- TSC2,
- UBR5, and
- VAV1.

== Clinical significance ==
Mutations in MAPK1 are implicated in many types of cancer.

== See also ==
- Extracellular signal-regulated kinases
