= PEA15 =

Protein-coding gene in humans

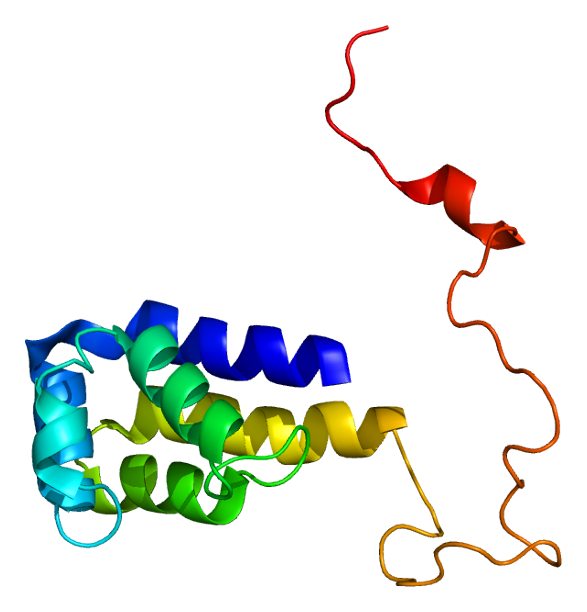

Identifiers
- Aliases: PEA15, HMAT1, HUMMAT1H, MAT1, MAT1H, PEA-15, PED, phosphoprotein enriched in astrocytes 15, PED-PED/proliferation and apoptosis adaptor protein 15
- External IDs: OMIM: 603434; MGI: 104799; GeneCards: PEA15
Available structures
| PDB | Ortholog search: PDBe RCSB |
| PDB | List of PDB id codes 4IZ5, 4IZA, 1N3K,%%s1N3K |

Gene location (Human)
| Chr. | Chromosome 1 (human) |
| Band | 1q23.2 | Start | 160,205,380 bp |
| Band | 1q23.2 | End | 160,215,376 bp |

Gene location (Mouse)
| Chr. | Chromosome 1 (mouse) |
| Band | 1 H3|1 79.54 cM | Start | 172,024,295 bp |
| Band | 1 H3|1 79.54 cM | End | 172,034,371 bp |
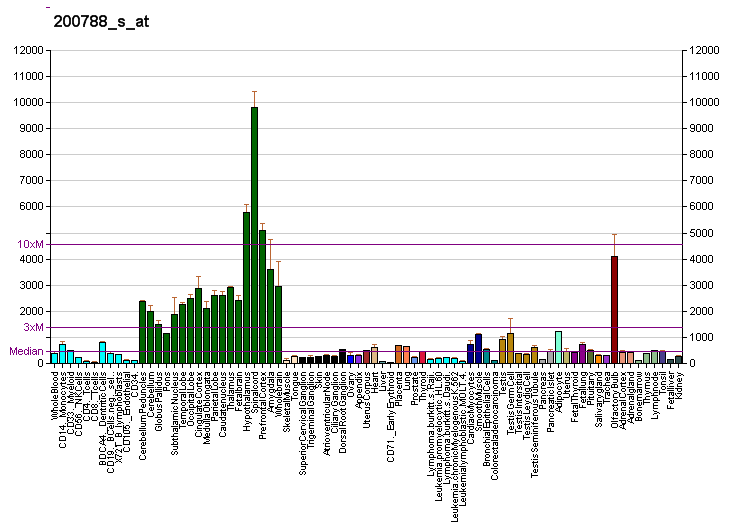

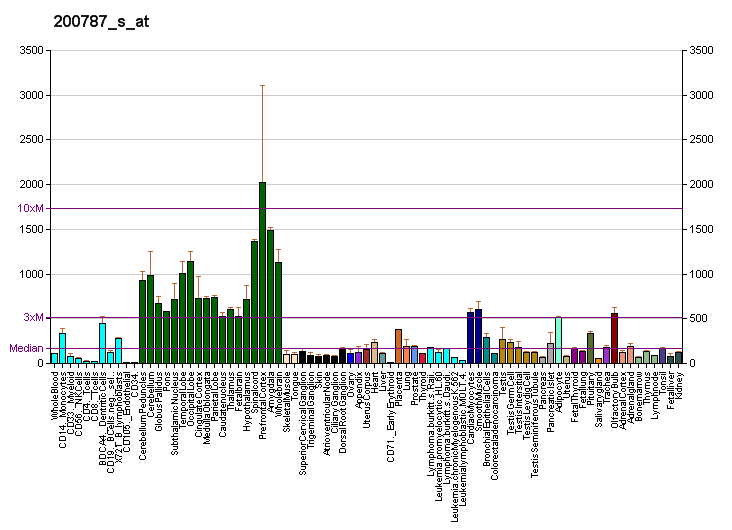
RNA expression pattern
| Bgee | Human / Mouse (ortholog); Top expressed in: dorsal motor nucleus of vagus nerve; spinal cord; C1 segment; subthalamic nucleus; inferior ganglion of vagus nerve; internal globus pallidus; superior vestibular nucleus; external globus pallidus; inferior olivary nucleus; pars reticulata / Top expressed in: ventricular zone; neural layer of retina; dentate gyrus of hippocampal formation granule cell; subiculum; optic nerve; cerebellar cortex; arcuate nucleus; ventromedial nucleus; ventral tegmental area; median eminence; More reference expression data |
| BioGPS | More reference expression data |
Gene ontology
| Molecular function | protein binding |
| Cellular component | cytoplasm; microtubule associated complex; nucleus; cytosol |
| Biological process | MAPK cascade; negative regulation of extrinsic apoptotic signaling pathway via death domain receptors; regulation of apoptotic process; positive regulation of extrinsic apoptotic signaling pathway via death domain receptors; negative regulation of glucose import; apoptotic process; carbohydrate transport; DNA damage checkpoint signaling; response to morphine |
Sources:Amigo / QuickGO
Orthologs
| Databases | NCBI: entry; OMA: entry |
| Species | Human | Mouse |
| Entrez | 8682 | 18611 |
| Ensembl | ENSG00000162734 | ENSMUSG00000013698 |
| UniProt | Q15121 | Q62048 |
| RefSeq (mRNA) | NM_001297576; NM_001297577; NM_001297578; NM_003768 | NM_011063; NM_001329869; NM_001329871; NM_008556 |
| RefSeq (protein) | NP_001284505; NP_001284506; NP_001284507; NP_003759; NP_001284506.1 NP_003759.1 | NP_001316798; NP_001316800; NP_035193 |
| Location (UCSC) | Chr 1: 160.21 – 160.22 Mb | Chr 1: 172.02 – 172.03 Mb |
| PubMed search |
- Wikidata
| View/Edit Human | View/Edit Mouse |

Astrocytic phosphoprotein PEA-15 is a protein that in humans is encoded by the PEA15 gene.

PEA15 is a death effector domain (DED)–containing protein predominantly expressed in the central nervous system, particularly in astrocytes.

PEA-15 promotes autophagy in glioma cells in a JNK-dependent manner.

== Interactions ==
PEA15 has been shown to interact with:

- Caspase 8,
- FADD, and
- MAPK1,
- Phospholipase D1, and
- RPS6KA3.
