= DUSP3 =

Protein-coding gene in the species Homo sapiens

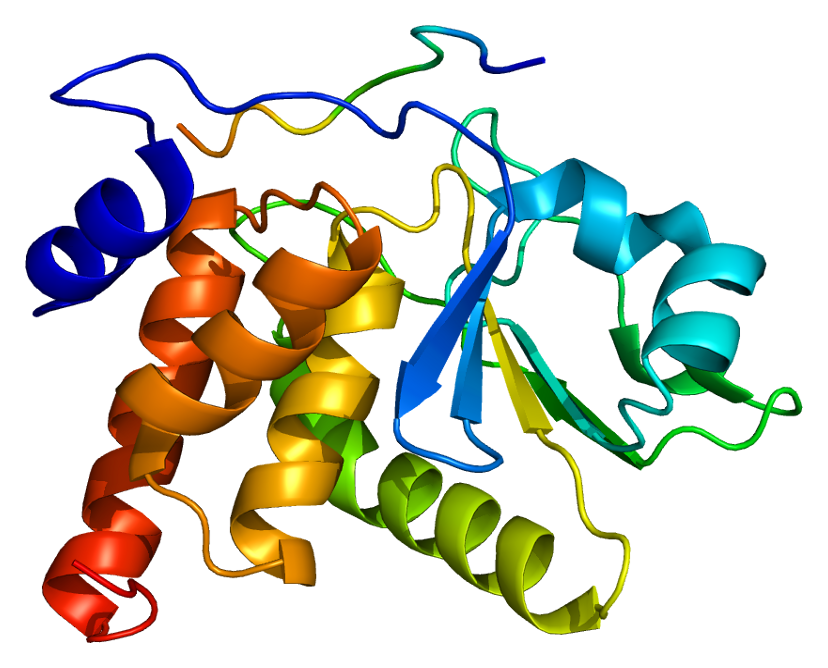

Identifiers
- Aliases: DUSP3, VHR, dual specificity phosphatase 3
- External IDs: OMIM: 600183; MGI: 1919599; GeneCards: DUSP3
Available structures
PDB	Ortholog search: PDBe RCSB
PDB	List of PDB id codes 1J4X, 1VHR, 3F81
Enzyme activity
EC #	BRENDA	ExPASy	KEGG	MetaCyc
3.1.3.16	↗	↗	↗	↗
3.1.3.48	↗	↗	↗	↗

Gene location (Human)
Chr.	Chromosome 17 (human)
Band	17q21.31	Start	43,766,125 bp
Band	17q21.31	End	43,778,977 bp

Gene location (Mouse)
Chr.	Chromosome 11 (mouse)
Band	11|11 D	Start	101,861,969 bp
Band	11|11 D	End	101,877,839 bp
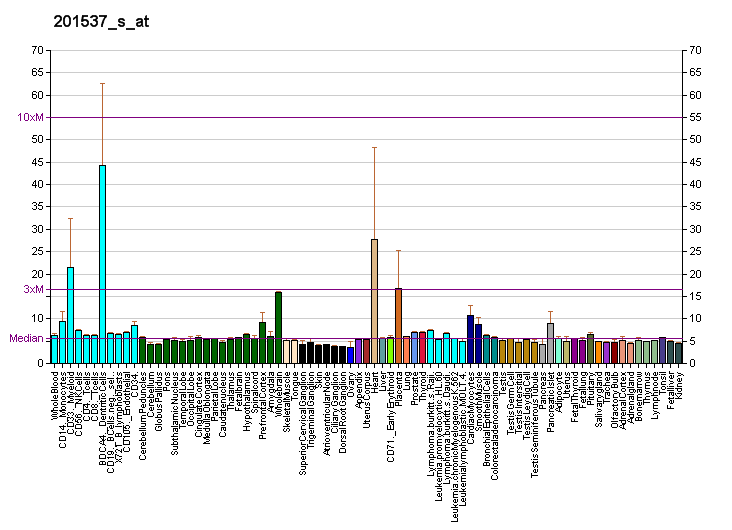

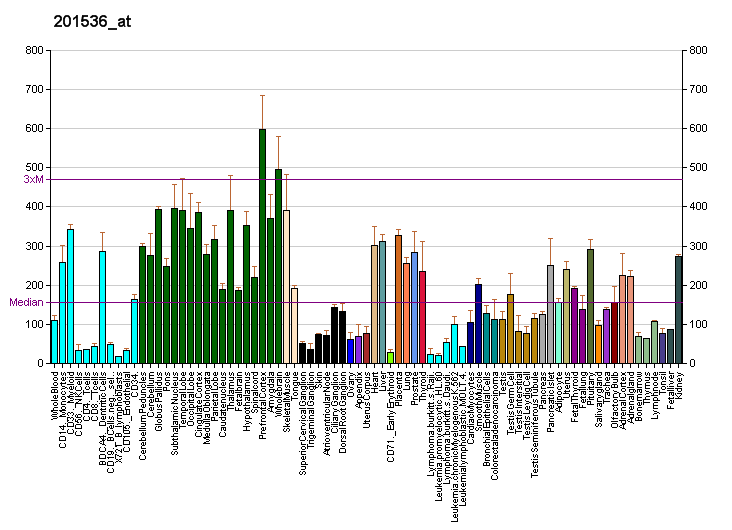

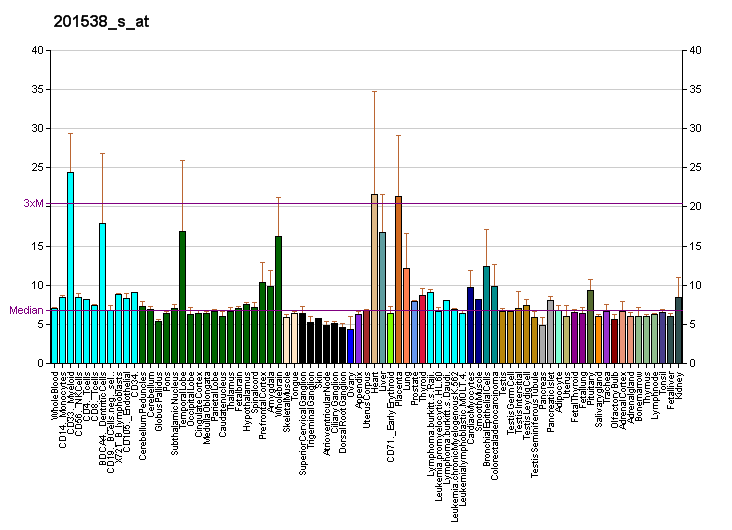
RNA expression pattern
Bgee	Human / Mouse (ortholog); Top expressed in: Skeletal muscle tissue of rectus abdominis; Skeletal muscle tissue of biceps brachii; saphenous vein; vastus lateralis muscle; muscle of thigh; myocardium of left ventricle; thoracic diaphragm; gastrocnemius muscle; right ventricle; apex of heart / Top expressed in: ascending aorta; aortic valve; substantia nigra; muscle of thigh; primary visual cortex; superior frontal gyrus; interventricular septum; skeletal muscle tissue; tunica media of zone of aorta; vastus lateralis muscle; More reference expression data
BioGPS	More reference expression data
Gene ontology
Molecular function	phosphoprotein phosphatase activity; MAP kinase phosphatase activity; hydrolase activity; protein kinase binding; protein tyrosine/serine/threonine phosphatase activity; phosphatase activity; protein tyrosine phosphatase activity; cytoskeletal protein binding; receptor tyrosine kinase binding; protein tyrosine kinase binding
Cellular component	cytosol; nucleoplasm; immunological synapse; nucleus
Biological process	protein dephosphorylation; positive regulation of mitotic cell cycle; negative regulation of T cell receptor signaling pathway; negative regulation of JNK cascade; negative regulation of MAPK cascade; negative regulation of ERK1 and ERK2 cascade; peptidyl-tyrosine dephosphorylation; negative regulation of T cell activation; in utero embryonic development; dephosphorylation; negative regulation of cell migration; negative regulation of epidermal growth factor receptor signaling pathway; negative regulation of chemotaxis; regulation of focal adhesion assembly; cellular response to epidermal growth factor stimulus; positive regulation of focal adhesion disassembly; peptidyl-tyrosine dephosphorylation involved in inactivation of protein kinase activity
Sources:Amigo / QuickGO
Orthologs
Databases	NCBI: entry; OMA: entry
Species	Human	Mouse
Entrez	1845	72349
Ensembl	ENSG00000108861	ENSMUSG00000003518
UniProt	P51452	Q9D7X3
RefSeq (mRNA)	NM_004090	NM_028207
RefSeq (protein)	NP_004081	NP_082483
Location (UCSC)	Chr 17: 43.77 – 43.78 Mb	Chr 11: 101.86 – 101.88 Mb
PubMed search
- Wikidata
View/Edit Human	View/Edit Mouse

Dual specificity protein phosphatase 3 is an enzyme that in humans is encoded by the DUSP3 gene.

The protein encoded by this gene is a member of the dual specificity protein phosphatase subfamily. These phosphatases inactivate their target kinases by dephosphorylating both the phosphoserine/threonine and phosphotyrosine residues. They negatively regulate members of the mitogen-activated protein (MAP) kinase superfamily (MAPK/ERK, SAPK/JNK, p38), which are associated with cellular proliferation and differentiation. Different members of the family of dual specificity phosphatases show distinct substrate specificities for various MAP kinases, different tissue distribution and subcellular localization, and different modes of inducibility of their expression by extracellular stimuli. This gene maps in a region that contains the BRCA1 locus which confers susceptibility to breast and ovarian cancer. Although DUSP3 is expressed in both breast and ovarian tissues, mutation screening in breast cancer pedigrees and in sporadic tumors was negative, leading to the conclusion that this gene is not BRCA1.

== Interactions ==
DUSP3 has been shown to interact with MAPK3 and MAPK1.
