= RPS6KA3 =

Enzyme found in humans

Identifiers
- Aliases: RPS6KA3, CLS, HU-3, ISPK-1, MAPKAPK1B, MRX19, RSK, RSK2, S6K-alpha3, p90-RSK2, pp90RSK2, ribosomal protein S6 kinase A3, XLID19
- External IDs: OMIM: 300075; MGI: 104557; GeneCards: RPS6KA3
Available structures
PDB	Ortholog search: PDBe RCSB
PDB	List of PDB id codes 4D9T, 4D9U, 4JG6, 4JG7, 4JG8, 4NUS, 4NW5, 4NW6, 5D9K, 5D9L
Enzyme activity
EC #	BRENDA	ExPASy	KEGG	MetaCyc
2.7.11.1	↗	↗	↗	↗

Gene location (Human)
Chr.	X chromosome (human)
Band	Xp22.12	Start	20,149,911 bp
Band	Xp22.12	End	20,267,519 bp

Gene location (Mouse)
Chr.	X chromosome (mouse)
Band	X F4|X 73.27 cM	Start	157,993,303 bp
Band	X F4|X 73.27 cM	End	158,151,240 bp
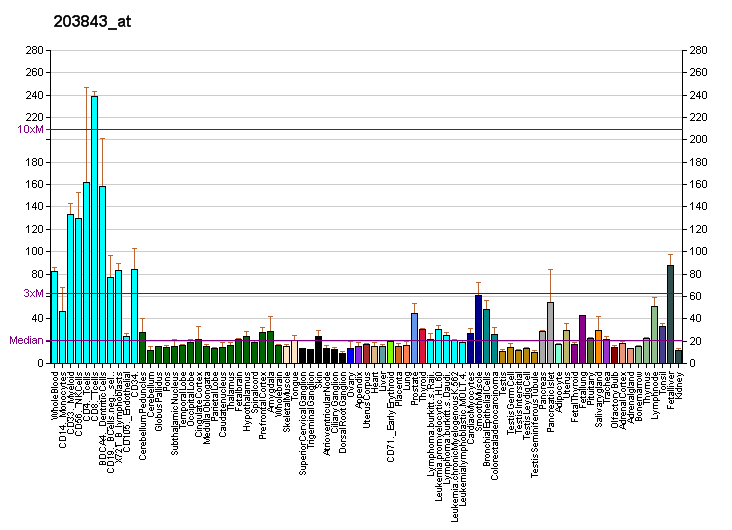
RNA expression pattern
Bgee	Human / Mouse (ortholog); Top expressed in: cartilage tissue; mucosa of sigmoid colon; biceps brachii; triceps brachii muscle; islet of Langerhans; deltoid muscle; gastrocnemius muscle; glutes; quadriceps femoris muscle; Skeletal muscle tissue of biceps brachii / Top expressed in: trigeminal ganglion; body of femur; left colon; white adipose tissue; lumbar spinal ganglion; Paneth cell; left lung lobe; genital tubercle; mandibular prominence; gastrula; More reference expression data
BioGPS	More reference expression data
Gene ontology
Molecular function	transferase activity; protein kinase activity; nucleotide binding; metal ion binding; cysteine-type endopeptidase inhibitor activity involved in apoptotic process; protein binding; ATP binding; protein kinase binding; magnesium ion binding; kinase activity; protein serine/threonine kinase activity; ribosomal protein S6 kinase activity
Cellular component	cytoplasm; cytosol; nucleoplasm; nucleus
Biological process	skeletal system development; negative regulation of cysteine-type endopeptidase activity involved in apoptotic process; regulation of translation in response to stress; intracellular signal transduction; phosphorylation; negative regulation of apoptotic process; protein phosphorylation; central nervous system development; positive regulation of cell growth; response to lipopolysaccharide; positive regulation of cell differentiation; cell cycle; regulation of DNA-templated transcription in response to stress; signal transduction; positive regulation of transcription by RNA polymerase II; toll-like receptor signaling pathway; apoptotic process; peptidyl-serine phosphorylation
Sources:Amigo / QuickGO
Orthologs
Databases	NCBI: entry; OMA: entry
Species	Human	Mouse
Entrez	6197	110651
Ensembl	ENSG00000177189	ENSMUSG00000031309
UniProt	P51812	P18654
RefSeq (mRNA)	NM_004586	NM_148945; NM_001346675
RefSeq (protein)	NP_004577	NP_001333604; NP_683747
Location (UCSC)	Chr X: 20.15 – 20.27 Mb	Chr X: 157.99 – 158.15 Mb
PubMed search
- Wikidata
View/Edit Human	View/Edit Mouse

protein S6 kinase, 90kDa, polypeptide 3, also s RPS6KA3, is an enzyme that in humans is encoded by the RPS6KA3 gene.

== Function ==
This gene encodes a member of the RSK (ribosomal S6 kinase) family of serine/threonine kinases. This kinase contains 2 non-identical kinase catalytic domains and phosphorylates various substrates, including members of the mitogen-activated kinase (MAPK) signalling pathway. The activity of this protein has been implicated in controlling cell growth and differentiation.

== Clinical significance ==
Mutations in this gene have been associated with Coffin–Lowry syndrome (CLS).

== Interactions ==
RPS6KA3 has been shown to interact with CREB-binding protein, MAPK1 and PEA15.
