= MAP2K1IP1 =

Protein-coding gene in the species Homo sapiens

LAMTOR3
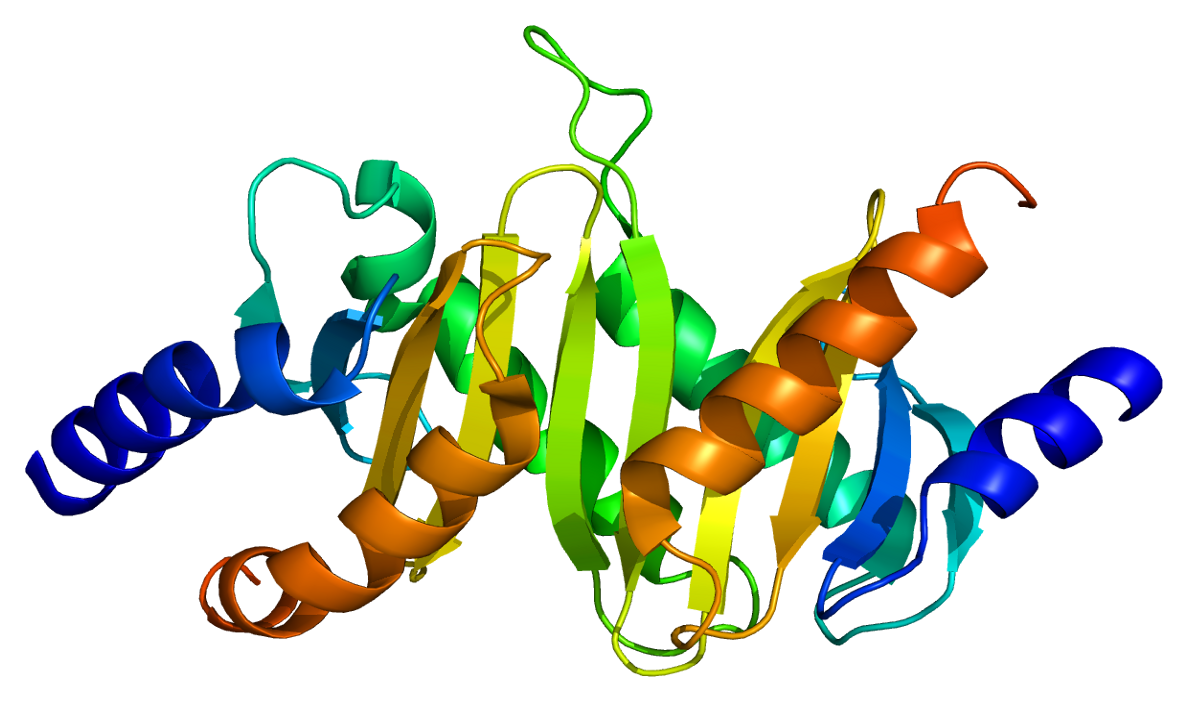
Available structures
PDB	Ortholog search: PDBe RCSB
PDB	List of PDB id codes 1SKO, 2ZL1, 3CPT

Identifiers
- Aliases: LAMTOR3, MAP2K1IP1, MAPBP, MAPKSP1, MP1, PRO0633, Ragulator3, late endosomal/lysosomal adaptor, MAPK and MTOR activator 3
- External IDs: OMIM: 603296; MGI: 1929467; HomoloGene: 10539; GeneCards: LAMTOR3; OMA:LAMTOR3 - orthologs

Gene location (Human)
Chr.	Chromosome 4 (human)
Band	4q23	Start	99,878,336 bp
Band	4q23	End	99,894,428 bp

Gene location (Mouse)
Chr.	Chromosome 3 (mouse)
Band	3|3 G3	Start	137,624,267 bp
Band	3|3 G3	End	137,634,661 bp
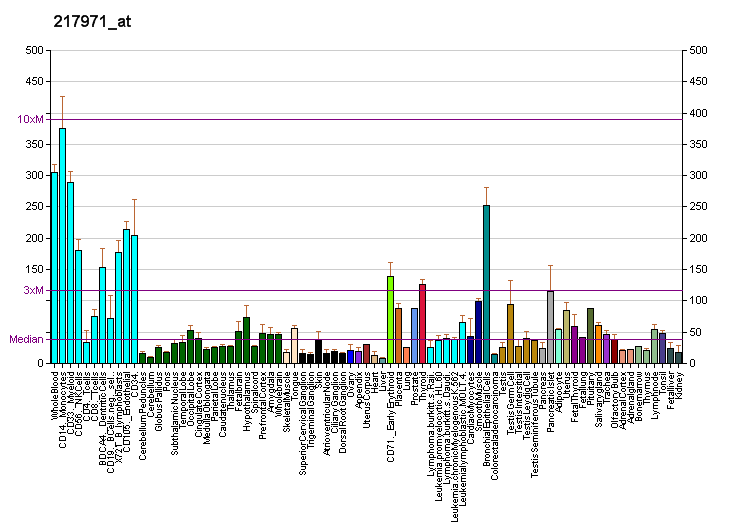
RNA expression pattern
Bgee	Human / Mouse (ortholog); Top expressed in: mucosa of sigmoid colon; oocyte; retinal pigment epithelium; ventricular zone; islet of Langerhans; Achilles tendon; secondary oocyte; palpebral conjunctiva; rectum; ganglionic eminence / Top expressed in: fossa; facial motor nucleus; secondary oocyte; condyle; renal corpuscle; medullary collecting duct; trigeminal ganglion; atrioventricular junction; vestibular membrane of cochlear duct; Paneth cell; More reference expression data
BioGPS	More reference expression data
Gene ontology
Molecular function	guanyl-nucleotide exchange factor activity; protein binding; molecular adaptor activity; kinase activator activity
Cellular component	endosome; membrane; late endosome membrane; focal adhesion; Ragulator complex; lysosomal membrane; endosome membrane; extracellular exosome; late endosome; plasma membrane; specific granule membrane; tertiary granule membrane
Biological process	regulation of TOR signaling; MAPK cascade; cellular response to amino acid stimulus; positive regulation of TOR signaling; neutrophil degranulation; regulation of macroautophagy
Sources:Amigo / QuickGO
Orthologs
Species	Human	Mouse
Entrez	8649	56692
Ensembl	ENSG00000109270	ENSMUSG00000091512
UniProt	Q9UHA4	O88653
RefSeq (mRNA)	NM_001243736; NM_021970	NM_019920
RefSeq (protein)	NP_001230665; NP_068805	NP_064304
Location (UCSC)	Chr 4: 99.88 – 99.89 Mb	Chr 3: 137.62 – 137.63 Mb
PubMed search
- Wikidata
View/Edit Human	View/Edit Mouse

Mitogen-activated protein kinase scaffold protein 1 is a scaffold protein that in humans is encoded by the MAPKSP1 gene.

== Function ==
The protein encoded by this gene was identified as an interacting protein that binds specifically to MAP kinase kinase MAP2K1/MEK1 and to MAP kinase MAPK2/ERK1. This protein enhances the activation of MAPK2, and thus is thought to function as an adaptor to enhance the efficiency of the MAP kinase cascade.

== Interactions ==
MAP2K1IP1 has been shown to interact with MAP2K1.
