= Eukaryotic translation initiation factor 4 gamma 1 =

Protein-coding gene in the species Homo sapiens

EIF4G1
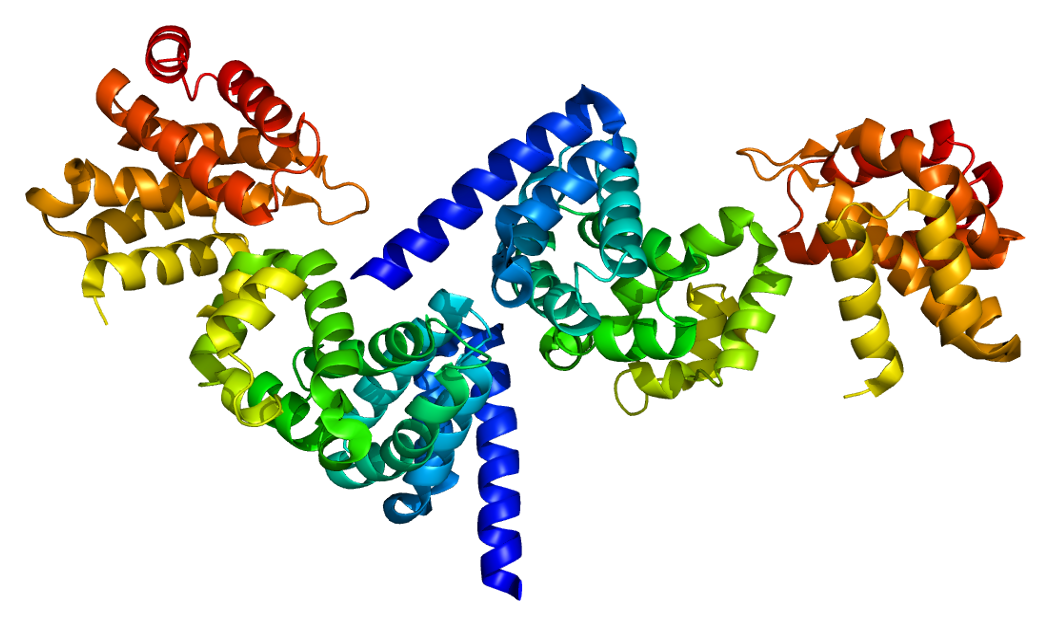

Identifiers
- Aliases: EIF4G1, EIF-4G1, EIF4F, EIF4G, EIF4GI, P220, PARK18, Eukaryotic translation initiation factor 4 gamma, eukaryotic translation initiation factor 4 gamma 1
- External IDs: OMIM: 600495; MGI: 2384784; GeneCards: EIF4G1
Available structures
PDB	Ortholog search: PDBe RCSB
PDB	List of PDB id codes 1LJ2, 1UG3, 2W97, 4AZA, 4F02

Gene location (Human)
Chr.	Chromosome 3 (human)
Band	3q27.1	Start	184,314,495 bp
Band	3q27.1	End	184,335,358 bp

Gene location (Mouse)
Chr.	Chromosome 16 (mouse)
Band	16|16 A3	Start	20,487,063 bp
Band	16|16 A3	End	20,511,634 bp
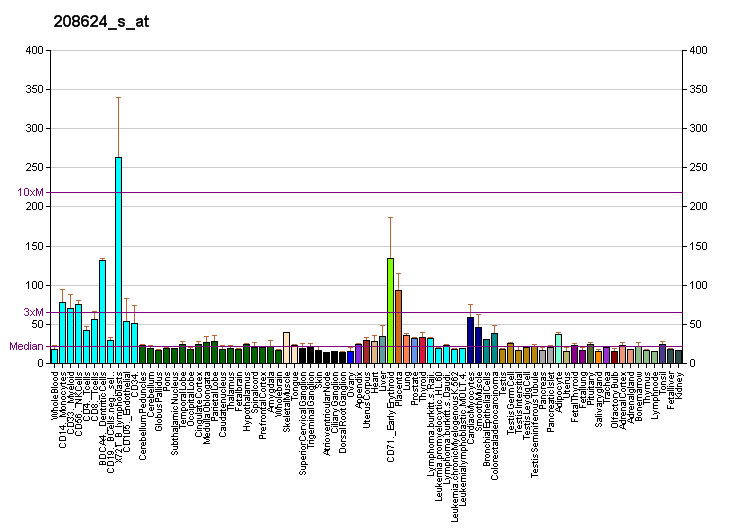

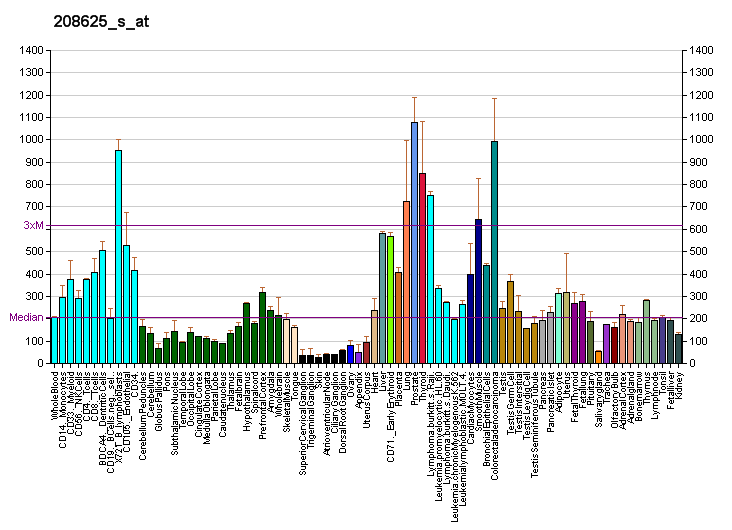
RNA expression pattern
Bgee	Human / Mouse (ortholog); Top expressed in: gastrocnemius muscle; skin of leg; skin of abdomen; stromal cell of endometrium; right lobe of liver; muscle of thigh; right lobe of thyroid gland; anterior pituitary; apex of heart; right adrenal gland / Top expressed in: lacrimal gland; tail of embryo; primitive streak; genital tubercle; ventricular zone; somite; muscle of thigh; hair follicle; submandibular gland; internal carotid artery; More reference expression data
BioGPS	More reference expression data
Gene ontology
Molecular function	translation initiation factor activity; protein binding; RNA binding; mRNA binding; ATP binding; translation factor activity, RNA binding; eukaryotic initiation factor 4E binding; translation initiation factor binding; molecular adaptor activity; cadherin binding; identical protein binding
Cellular component	cytosol; membrane; nucleus; cytoplasm; polysome; eukaryotic translation initiation factor 4F complex; cytosolic small ribosomal subunit; postsynapse
Biological process	nuclear-transcribed mRNA poly(A) tail shortening; regulation of mRNA stability; behavioral fear response; positive regulation of neuron differentiation; nuclear-transcribed mRNA catabolic process, nonsense-mediated decay; viral process; regulation of translation; regulation of translational initiation; cap-dependent translational initiation; protein biosynthesis; translational initiation; mitochondrion organization; positive regulation of cell population proliferation; negative regulation of autophagy; negative regulation of peptidyl-threonine phosphorylation; positive regulation of cell growth; positive regulation of protein metabolic process; developmental process; positive regulation of peptidyl-serine phosphorylation; cellular macromolecule biosynthetic process; regulation of gene silencing by miRNA; regulation of cellular response to stress; positive regulation of G1/S transition of mitotic cell cycle; negative regulation of neuron death; positive regulation of eukaryotic translation initiation factor 4F complex assembly; regulation of presynapse assembly; positive regulation of mRNA cap binding; regulation of polysome binding; positive regulation of cell death; cellular response to nutrient levels; energy homeostasis; lung development; response to ethanol
Sources:Amigo / QuickGO
Orthologs
Databases	NCBI: entry; OMA: entry
Species	Human	Mouse
Entrez	1981	208643
Ensembl	ENSG00000114867	ENSMUSG00000045983
UniProt	Q04637	Q6NZJ6
RefSeq (mRNA)	NM_198244; NM_001194946; NM_001194947; NM_001291157; NM_004953 NM_182917; NM_198241; NM_198242	NM_001005331; NM_145941; NM_001304432
RefSeq (protein)	NP_001181875; NP_001181876; NP_001278086; NP_004944; NP_886553 NP_937884; NP_937885; NP_937887	NP_001291361; NP_666053; NP_001390389; NP_001390390; NP_001390391 NP_001390392; NP_001390393; NP_001390394; NP_001390395; NP_001390396; NP_001390397
Location (UCSC)	Chr 3: 184.31 – 184.34 Mb	Chr 16: 20.49 – 20.51 Mb
PubMed search
- Wikidata
View/Edit Human	View/Edit Mouse

Eukaryotic translation initiation factor 4 gamma 1 is a protein that in humans is encoded by the EIF4G1 gene.

== Function ==
The protein encoded by this gene is a component of the protein complex eIF4F, which is involved in the recognition of the mRNA cap, ATP-dependent unwinding of 5'-terminal secondary structure (carried out by the eIF4A subunit), and recruitment of mRNA to the ribosome. Alternative splicing results in five transcript variants encoding four distinct isoforms. eIF4G serves as a scaffold, interacting with mRNA and the other components of the eIF4F complex, as well as the PABP and eIF3. It also facilitates the loading of the small ribosomal subunit onto the mRNA.

eIF4G1 controls mitochondrial oxidative phosphorylation, axonal morphogenesis, and memory through promoting translation of select mRNAs, although it has a general role in canonical eukaryotic translation initiation

== Interactions ==
Eukaryotic translation initiation factor 4 gamma has been shown to interact with MKNK1, EIF4A1, EIF4E, MKNK2 and PABPC1.

== See also ==
- Eukaryotic initiation factor
