= PTPN7 =

Protein-coding gene in humans

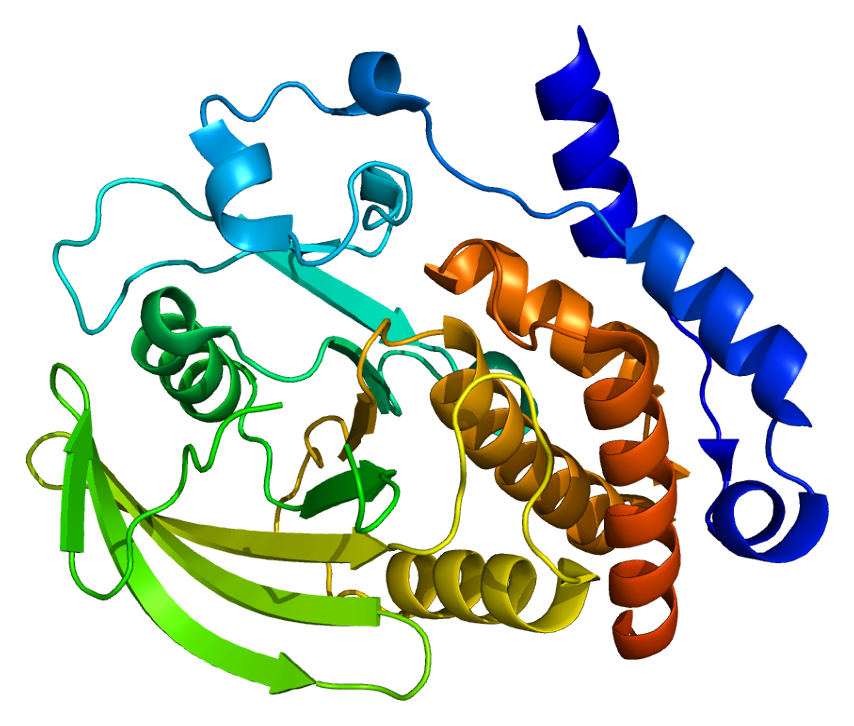

Identifiers
- Aliases: PTPN7, BPTP-4, HEPTP, LC-PTP, LPTP, PTPNI, protein tyrosine phosphatase, non-receptor type 7, protein tyrosine phosphatase non-receptor type 7
- External IDs: OMIM: 176889; MGI: 2156893; GeneCards: PTPN7
Available structures
PDB	Ortholog search: PDBe RCSB
PDB	List of PDB id codes 1ZC0, 2A3K, 2GP0, 2GPH, 2HVL, 2QDC, 2QDM, 2QDP, 3D42, 3D44, 3O4S, 3O4T, 3O4U
Enzyme activity
EC #	BRENDA	ExPASy	KEGG	MetaCyc
3.1.3.48	↗	↗	↗	↗

Gene location (Human)
Chr.	Chromosome 1 (human)
Band	1q32.1	Start	202,147,013 bp
Band	1q32.1	End	202,161,588 bp

Gene location (Mouse)
Chr.	Chromosome 1 (mouse)
Band	1|1 E4	Start	135,060,438 bp
Band	1|1 E4	End	135,073,055 bp
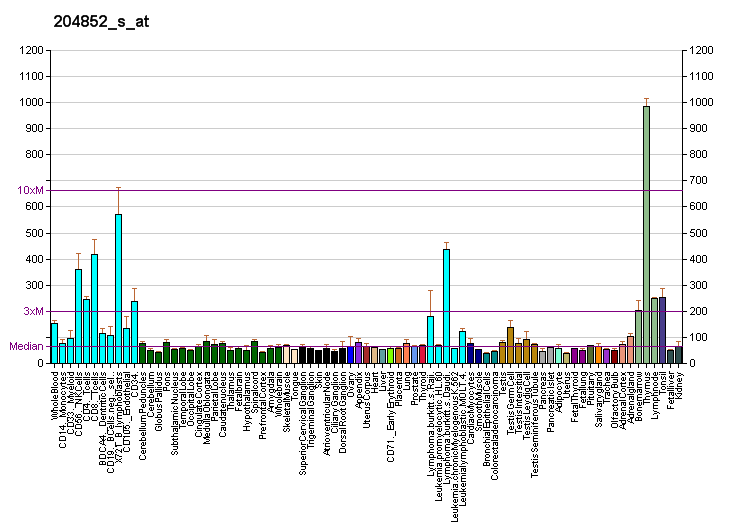
RNA expression pattern
Bgee	Human / Mouse (ortholog); Top expressed in: granulocyte; lymph node; bone marrow cell; appendix; thymus; blood; spleen; right testis; left testis; putamen / Top expressed in: thymus; granulocyte; bone marrow; spleen; striatum of neuraxis; embryo; pharynx; neck; yolk sac; jejunum; More reference expression data
BioGPS	More reference expression data
Gene ontology
Molecular function	protein tyrosine phosphatase activity; phosphatase activity; protein binding; phosphoprotein phosphatase activity; hydrolase activity
Cellular component	cytoplasmic side of plasma membrane; cytoskeleton; cytoplasm; cytosol; nucleoplasm
Biological process	dephosphorylation; peptidyl-tyrosine dephosphorylation; protein dephosphorylation; cellular response to cytokine stimulus
Sources:Amigo / QuickGO
Orthologs
Databases	NCBI: entry; OMA: entry
Species	Human	Mouse
Entrez	5778	320139
Ensembl	ENSG00000143851	ENSMUSG00000031506
UniProt	P35236	Q8BUM3
RefSeq (mRNA)	NM_001199797; NM_002832; NM_080588; NM_080589; NM_001364877 NM_001364878	NM_177081; NM_001356382
RefSeq (protein)	NP_001186726; NP_002823; NP_542155; NP_001351806; NP_001351807	NP_796055; NP_001343311
Location (UCSC)	Chr 1: 202.15 – 202.16 Mb	Chr 1: 135.06 – 135.07 Mb
PubMed search
- Wikidata
View/Edit Human	View/Edit Mouse

Protein tyrosine phosphatase non-receptor type 7 is an enzyme that in humans is encoded by the PTPN7 gene.

== Function ==
The protein encoded by this gene is a member of the protein tyrosine phosphatase (PTP) family. PTPs are known to be signaling molecules that regulate a variety of cellular processes including cell growth, differentiation, mitotic cycle, and oncogenic transformation. This gene is preferentially expressed in a variety of hematopoietic cells, and is an early response gene in lymphokine stimulated cells. The noncatalytic N-terminus of this PTP can interact with MAP kinases and suppress the MAP kinase activities. This PTP was shown to be involved in the regulation of T cell antigen receptor (TCR) signaling, which was thought to function through dephosphorylating the molecules related to MAP kinase pathway. Two alternatively spliced transcript variants encoding different isoforms have been found for this gene.

== Interactions ==
PTPN7 has been shown to interact with MAPK3 and MAPK1.
