= Phosphatidylethanolamine binding protein 1 =

Protein-coding gene in the species Homo sapiens

PEBP1
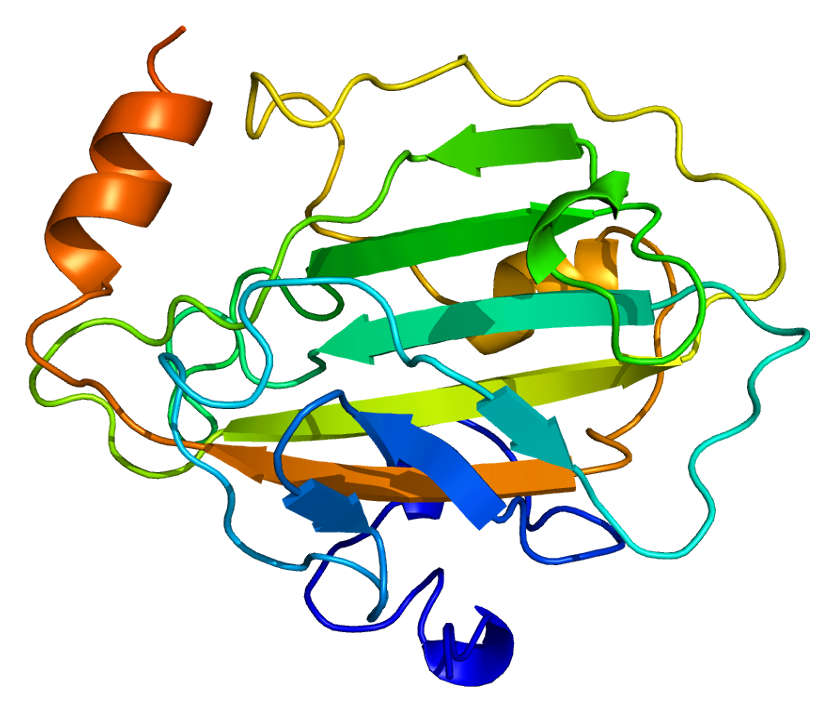
Available structures
PDB	Ortholog search: PDBe RCSB
PDB	List of PDB id codes 1BD9, 1BEH, 2L7W, 2QYQ

Identifiers
- Aliases: PEBP1, HCNP, HCNPpp, HEL-210, HEL-S-34, PBP, PEBP, PEBP-1, RKIP, HEL-S-96, Phosphatidylethanolamine binding protein 1
- External IDs: OMIM: 604591; MGI: 1344408; HomoloGene: 37637; GeneCards: PEBP1; OMA:PEBP1 - orthologs

Gene location (Human)
Chr.	Chromosome 12 (human)
Band	12q24.23	Start	118,136,124 bp
Band	12q24.23	End	118,145,584 bp

Gene location (Mouse)
Chr.	Chromosome 5 (mouse)
Band	5 F|5 56.88 cM	Start	117,420,719 bp
Band	5 F|5 56.88 cM	End	117,425,690 bp
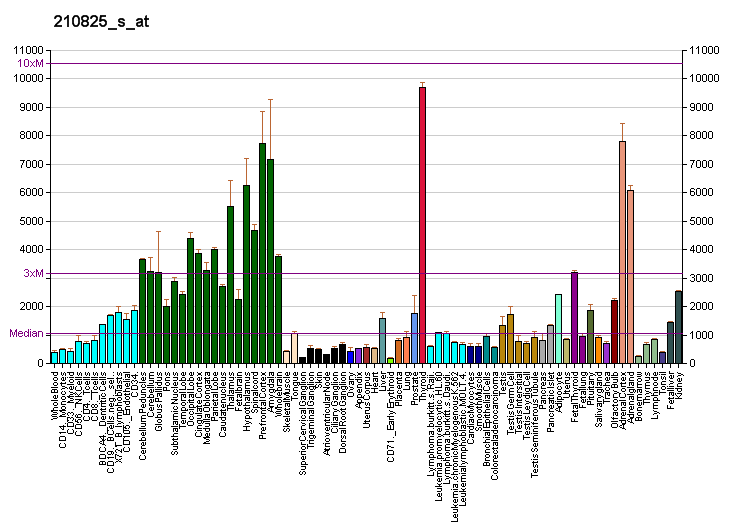

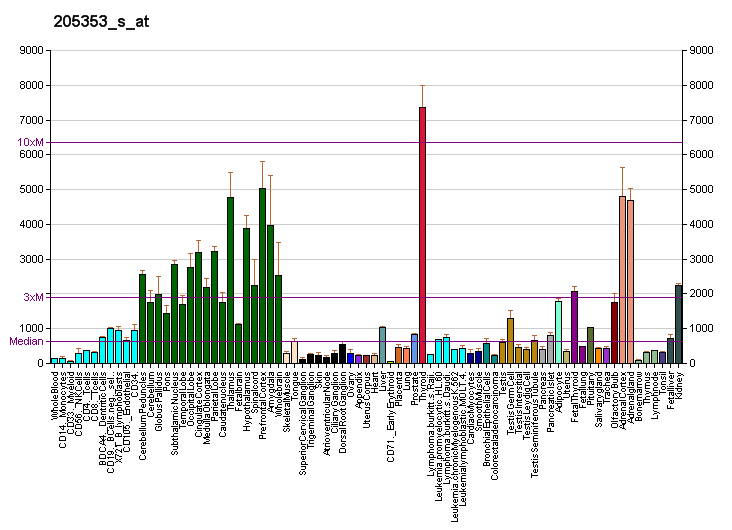
RNA expression pattern
Bgee	Human / Mouse (ortholog); Top expressed in: renal medulla; postcentral gyrus; right adrenal cortex; left adrenal gland; left adrenal cortex; internal globus pallidus; superior frontal gyrus; Brodmann area 9; prefrontal cortex; superior vestibular nucleus / Top expressed in: testicle; spermatid; adrenal gland; mesencephalon; proximal tubule; spermatocyte; neural tube; dentate gyrus of hippocampal formation granule cell; hippocampus proper; lens; More reference expression data
BioGPS	More reference expression data
Gene ontology
Molecular function	protein binding; lipid binding; nucleotide binding; protein kinase binding; phosphatidylethanolamine binding; serine-type endopeptidase inhibitor activity; ATP binding; enzyme binding; peptidase inhibitor activity; RNA binding; signaling receptor binding; mitogen-activated protein kinase binding
Cellular component	cytoplasm; cytosol; nucleus; extracellular exosome; extracellular space; mitochondrion; mitochondrial outer membrane; Golgi apparatus; synaptic vesicle; cell surface; soma; myelin sheath; axon terminus; apical part of cell
Biological process	MAPK cascade; negative regulation of peptidase activity; negative regulation of endopeptidase activity; regulation of neurotransmitter levels; regulation of the force of heart contraction; response to oxidative stress; ageing; response to heat; response to wounding; response to toxic substance; response to organonitrogen compound; response to activity; hippocampus development; negative regulation of MAPK cascade; positive regulation of cAMP-mediated signaling; response to ethanol; positive regulation of mitotic nuclear division; sperm capacitation; response to corticosterone; response to cAMP; response to calcium ion; positive regulation of acetylcholine metabolic process
Sources:Amigo / QuickGO
Orthologs
Species	Human	Mouse
Entrez	5037	23980
Ensembl	ENSG00000089220	ENSMUSG00000032959
UniProt	P30086	P70296
RefSeq (mRNA)	NM_002567	NM_018858
RefSeq (protein)	NP_002558	NP_061346
Location (UCSC)	Chr 12: 118.14 – 118.15 Mb	Chr 5: 117.42 – 117.43 Mb
PubMed search
- Wikidata
View/Edit Human	View/Edit Mouse

Phosphatidylethanolamine-binding protein 1 is a protein that in humans is encoded by the PEBP1 gene.

== Interactions ==
Phosphatidylethanolamine binding protein 1 has been shown to interact with:

- C-Raf,
- MAP2K1, and
- MAPK1.
