= MAPK3 =

Protein-coding gene in the species Homo sapiens

Identifiers
- Aliases: MAPK3, ERK-1, ERK1, ERT2, HS44KDAP, HUMKER1A, P44ERK1, P44MAPK, PRKM3, p44-ERK1, p44-MAPK, mitogen-activated protein kinase 3
- External IDs: OMIM: 601795; MGI: 1346859; GeneCards: MAPK3
Available structures
| PDB | Ortholog search: PDBe RCSB |
| PDB | List of PDB id codes 2ZOQ, 4QTB |
Enzyme activity
| EC # | BRENDA | ExPASy | KEGG | MetaCyc |
|---|---|---|---|---|
| 2.7.11.24 | ↗ | ↗ | ↗ | ↗ |

Gene location (Human)
| Chr. | Chromosome 16 (human) |
| Band | 16p11.2 | Start | 30,114,105 bp |
| Band | 16p11.2 | End | 30,123,506 bp |

Gene location (Mouse)
| Chr. | Chromosome 7 (mouse) |
| Band | 7 F3|7 69.25 cM | Start | 126,358,773 bp |
| Band | 7 F3|7 69.25 cM | End | 126,364,991 bp |
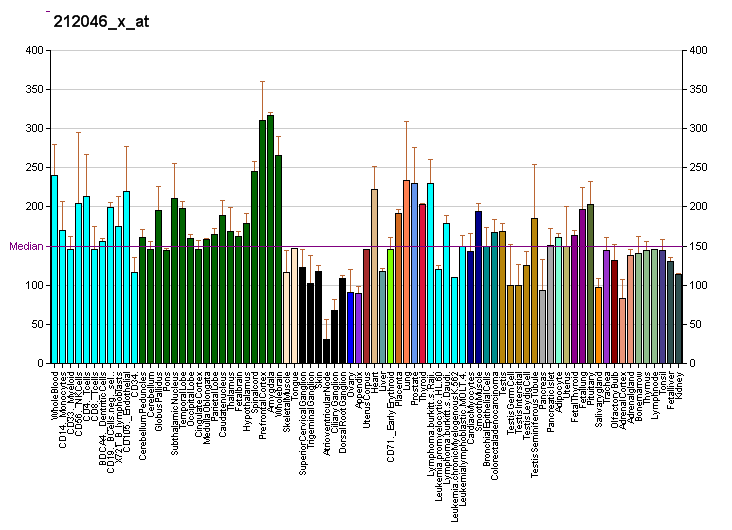
RNA expression pattern
| Bgee | Human / Mouse (ortholog); Top expressed in: right frontal lobe; mucosa of transverse colon; amygdala; cingulate gyrus; anterior cingulate cortex; gastric mucosa; nucleus accumbens; ectocervix; rectum; C1 segment / Top expressed in: granulocyte; dentate gyrus of hippocampal formation granule cell; yolk sac; pyloric antrum; lip; entorhinal cortex; large intestine; colon; epithelium of stomach; duodenum; More reference expression data |
| BioGPS | More reference expression data |
Gene ontology
| Molecular function | phosphatase binding; ATP binding; protein kinase activity; MAP kinase activity; transferase activity; phosphotyrosine residue binding; scaffold protein binding; protein binding; nucleotide binding; kinase activity; protein serine/threonine kinase activity; MAP kinase kinase activity; identical protein binding |
| Cellular component | cytosol; nuclear envelope; focal adhesion; mitochondrion; cytoskeleton; nucleus; late endosome; Golgi apparatus; early endosome; pseudopodium; nucleoplasm; cytoplasm; plasma membrane; caveola; membrane; protein-containing complex |
| Biological process | caveolin-mediated endocytosis; positive regulation of protein phosphorylation; positive regulation of telomere capping; response to exogenous dsRNA; cardiac neural crest cell development involved in heart development; positive regulation of xenophagy; positive regulation of translation; cellular response to DNA damage stimulus; platelet activation; Fc-epsilon receptor signaling pathway; protein phosphorylation; cellular response to mechanical stimulus; face development; positive regulation of histone modification; regulation of DNA-binding transcription factor activity; DNA damage induced protein phosphorylation; positive regulation of ERK1 and ERK2 cascade; animal organ morphogenesis; cell cycle; apoptotic process; Fc-gamma receptor signaling pathway involved in phagocytosis; thymus development; ERK1 and ERK2 cascade; negative regulation of apolipoprotein binding; transcription, DNA-templated; cartilage development; viral process; response to toxic substance; regulation of stress-activated MAPK cascade; phosphorylation; outer ear morphogenesis; BMP signaling pathway; response to lipopolysaccharide; thyroid gland development; response to epidermal growth factor; positive regulation of MAP kinase activity; positive regulation of telomerase activity; peptidyl-tyrosine autophosphorylation; sensory perception of pain; positive regulation of cyclase activity; trachea formation; lipopolysaccharide-mediated signaling pathway; intracellular signal transduction; lung morphogenesis; neural crest cell development; transcription initiation from RNA polymerase I promoter; regulation of early endosome to late endosome transport; positive regulation of telomere maintenance via telomerase; MAPK cascade; positive regulation of histone acetylation; axon guidance; interleukin-1-mediated signaling pathway; fibroblast growth factor receptor signaling pathway; peptidyl-serine phosphorylation; regulation of cellular response to heat; Bergmann glial cell differentiation; regulation of Golgi inheritance; arachidonic acid metabolic process; regulation of cytoskeleton organization; positive regulation of transcription by RNA polymerase II; regulation of phosphatidylinositol 3-kinase signaling; regulation of ossification; positive regulation of gene expression; positive regulation of macrophage chemotaxis; cellular response to amino acid starvation; cellular response to reactive oxygen species; stress-activated MAPK cascade; cellular response to cadmium ion; cellular response to dopamine; positive regulation of metallopeptidase activity; regulation of cellular pH; protein-containing complex assembly; cellular response to tumor necrosis factor; regulation of gene expression; cellular response to organic substance; ageing; decidualization |
Sources:Amigo / QuickGO
Orthologs
| Databases | NCBI: entry; OMA: entry |
| Species | Human | Mouse |
| Entrez | 5595 | 26417 |
| Ensembl | ENSG00000102882 | ENSMUSG00000063065 |
| UniProt | P27361 | Q63844 |
| RefSeq (mRNA) | NM_001040056; NM_001109891; NM_002746 | NM_011952 |
| RefSeq (protein) | NP_001035145; NP_001103361; NP_002737 | NP_036082 |
| Location (UCSC) | Chr 16: 30.11 – 30.12 Mb | Chr 7: 126.36 – 126.36 Mb |
| PubMed search |
- Wikidata
| View/Edit Human | View/Edit Mouse |

Mitogen-activated protein kinase 3, also known as p44MAPK and ERK1, is an enzyme that in humans is encoded by the MAPK3 gene.

== Function ==
The protein encoded by this gene is a member of the mitogen-activated protein kinase (MAP kinase) family. MAP kinases, also known as extracellular signal-regulated kinases (ERKs), act in a signaling cascade that regulates various cellular processes such as proliferation, differentiation, and cell cycle progression in response to a variety of extracellular signals. This kinase is activated by upstream kinases, resulting in its translocation to the nucleus where it phosphorylates nuclear targets. Alternatively spliced transcript variants encoding different protein isoforms have been described.

== Clinical significance ==
It has been suggested that MAPK3, along with the gene IRAK1, is turned off by two microRNAs that were activated after the influenza A virus had been made to infect human lung cells.

== Signaling pathways ==
Pharmacological inhibition of ERK1/2 restores GSK3β activity and protein synthesis levels in a model of tuberous sclerosis.

== Interactions ==
MAPK3 has been shown to interact with:

- DUSP3,
- DUSP6
- GTF2I,
- HDAC4,
- MAP2K1,
- MAP2K2,
- PTPN7,
- RPS6KA2, and
- SPIB.
