= MKNK2 =

Protein-coding gene in the species Homo sapiens

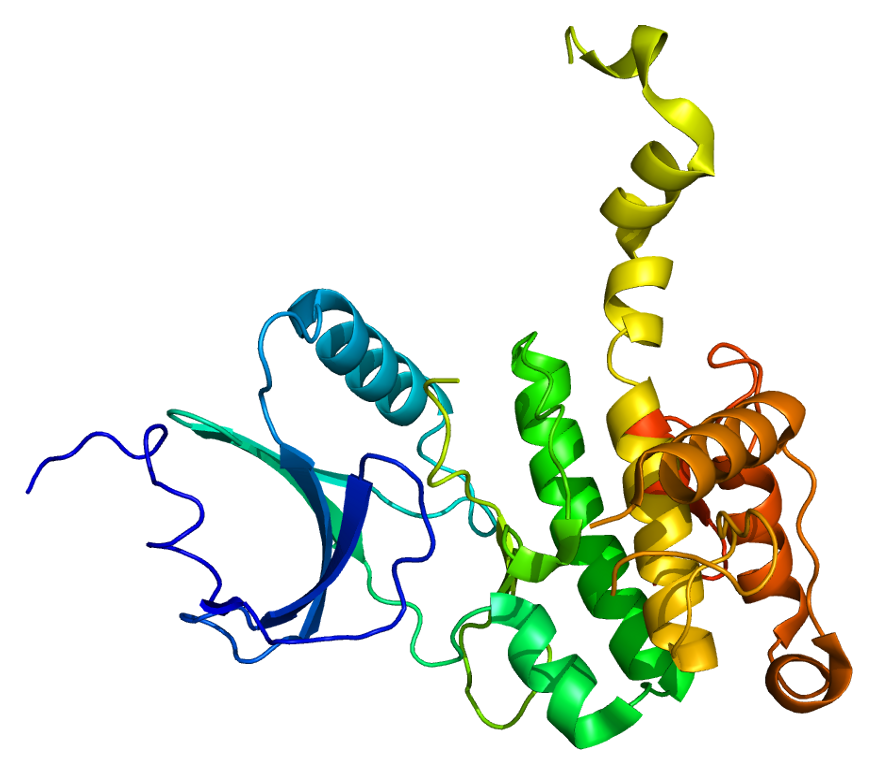

Identifiers
- Aliases: MKNK2, GPRK7, MNK2, MAP kinase interacting serine/threonine kinase 2, MAPK interacting serine/threonine kinase 2
- External IDs: OMIM: 605069; MGI: 894279; GeneCards: MKNK2
Available structures
PDB	Ortholog search: PDBe RCSB
PDB	List of PDB id codes 2AC3, 2AC5
Enzyme activity
EC #	BRENDA	ExPASy	KEGG	MetaCyc
2.7.11.1	↗	↗	↗	↗

Gene location (Human)
Chr.	Chromosome 19 (human)
Band	19p13.3	Start	2,037,465 bp
Band	19p13.3	End	2,051,244 bp

Gene location (Mouse)
Chr.	Chromosome 10 (mouse)
Band	10|10 C1	Start	80,501,161 bp
Band	10|10 C1	End	80,513,946 bp
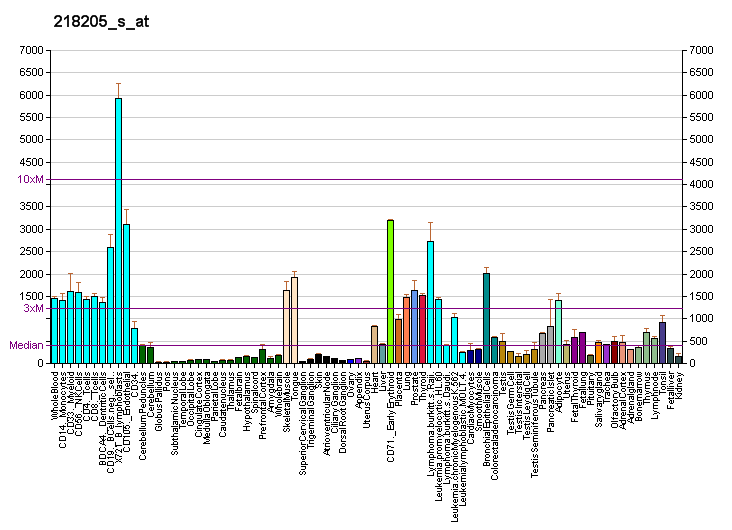
RNA expression pattern
Bgee	Human / Mouse (ortholog); Top expressed in: superior surface of tongue; parotid gland; body of tongue; mucosa of pharynx; amniotic fluid; gastrocnemius muscle; buccal mucosa cell; skin of thigh; tibialis anterior muscle; Skeletal muscle tissue of rectus abdominis / Top expressed in: subcutaneous adipose tissue; brown adipose tissue; temporal muscle; ankle; digastric muscle; white adipose tissue; tunica adventitia of aorta; intercostal muscle; sternocleidomastoid muscle; triceps brachii muscle; More reference expression data
BioGPS	More reference expression data
Gene ontology
Molecular function	transferase activity; nucleotide binding; protein kinase activity; calcium-dependent protein serine/threonine kinase activity; metal ion binding; calmodulin binding; kinase activity; protein serine/threonine kinase activity; protein binding; calmodulin-dependent protein kinase activity; ATP binding
Cellular component	cytoplasm; PML body; nuclear body; nucleus; nucleoplasm
Biological process	intracellular signal transduction; phosphorylation; protein phosphorylation; cell surface receptor signaling pathway; cellular response to arsenic-containing substance; peptidyl-serine phosphorylation; extrinsic apoptotic signaling pathway in absence of ligand; protein autophosphorylation; regulation of translation; apoptotic process; hemopoiesis
Sources:Amigo / QuickGO
Orthologs
Databases	NCBI: entry; OMA: entry
Species	Human	Mouse
Entrez	2872	17347
Ensembl	ENSG00000099875	ENSMUSG00000020190
UniProt	Q9HBH9	Q8CDB0
RefSeq (mRNA)	NM_199054; NM_017572	NM_021462
RefSeq (protein)	NP_060042; NP_951009	NP_067437
Location (UCSC)	Chr 19: 2.04 – 2.05 Mb	Chr 10: 80.5 – 80.51 Mb
PubMed search
- Wikidata
View/Edit Human	View/Edit Mouse

MAP kinase-interacting serine/threonine-protein kinase 2 is an enzyme that in humans is encoded by the MKNK2 gene.

== Interactions ==
MNK2 has been shown to interact with MAPK1 and Eukaryotic translation initiation factor 4 gamma.

MNK2 has been identified as a therapeutic target for diabetes. Specifically, blocking MNK2 interaction with eIF4G has been shown to boost protein synthesis and promote beta cell regeneration.
