= MKNK1 =

Protein-coding gene in humans

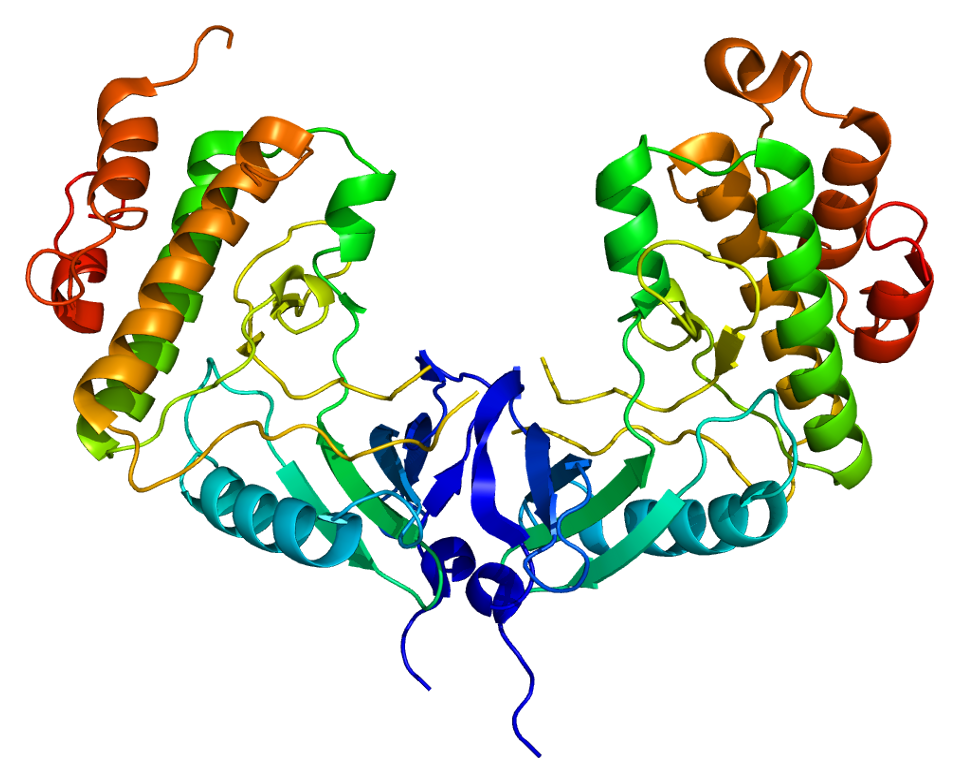

Identifiers
- Aliases: MKNK1, MNK1, MAP kinase interacting serine/threonine kinase 1, MAPK interacting serine/threonine kinase 1
- External IDs: OMIM: 606724; MGI: 894316; GeneCards: MKNK1
Available structures
PDB	Ortholog search: PDBe RCSB
PDB	List of PDB id codes 2HW6, 2Y9Q
Enzyme activity
EC #	BRENDA	ExPASy	KEGG	MetaCyc
2.7.11.1	↗	↗	↗	↗

Gene location (Human)
Chr.	Chromosome 1 (human)
Band	1p33	Start	46,557,407 bp
Band	1p33	End	46,616,843 bp

Gene location (Mouse)
Chr.	Chromosome 4 (mouse)
Band	4|4 D1	Start	115,696,395 bp
Band	4|4 D1	End	115,736,447 bp
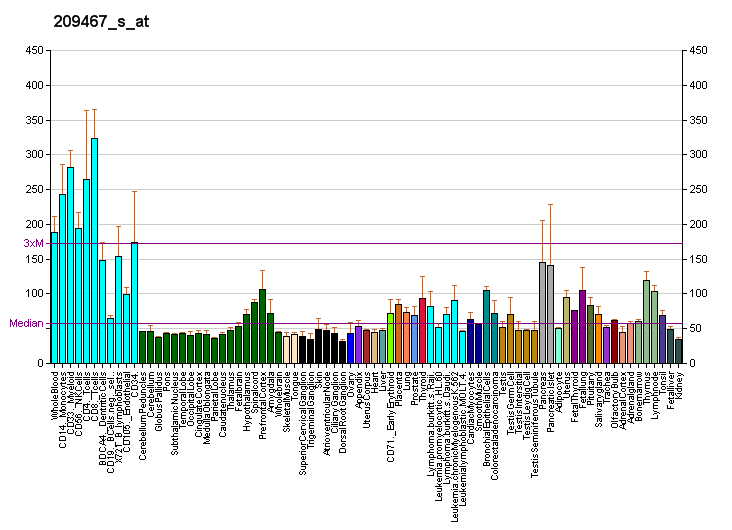
RNA expression pattern
Bgee	Human / Mouse (ortholog); Top expressed in: body of pancreas; spleen; Descending thoracic aorta; blood; gastric mucosa; secondary oocyte; muscle layer of sigmoid colon; right coronary artery; upper lobe of left lung; monocyte / Top expressed in: granulocyte; secondary oocyte; stroma of bone marrow; primary oocyte; neural layer of retina; thymus; lip; muscle of thigh; pancreas; dentate gyrus of hippocampal formation granule cell; More reference expression data
BioGPS	More reference expression data
Gene ontology
Molecular function	transferase activity; nucleotide binding; protein kinase activity; calcium-dependent protein serine/threonine kinase activity; calmodulin binding; kinase activity; protein binding; calmodulin-dependent protein kinase activity; ATP binding; protein serine/threonine kinase activity; metal ion binding
Cellular component	cytoplasm; cytosol; nucleoplasm; nucleus
Biological process	intracellular signal transduction; phosphorylation; protein phosphorylation; protein autophosphorylation; regulation of translation; peptidyl-serine phosphorylation
Sources:Amigo / QuickGO
Orthologs
Databases	NCBI: entry; OMA: entry
Species	Human	Mouse
Entrez	8569	17346
Ensembl	ENSG00000079277	ENSMUSG00000028708
UniProt	Q9BUB5	O08605
RefSeq (mRNA)	NM_001135553; NM_003684; NM_198973; NM_001377337; NM_001377338 NM_001377341; NM_001377342; NM_001377343; NM_001377373; NM_001377374; NM_001377375	NM_001285487; NM_001285488; NM_021461; NM_001355174; NM_001369238
RefSeq (protein)	NP_001129025; NP_003675; NP_945324; NP_001364266; NP_001364267 NP_001364270; NP_001364271; NP_001364272; NP_001364302; NP_001364303; NP_001364304	NP_001272416; NP_001272417; NP_067436; NP_001342103; NP_001356167
Location (UCSC)	Chr 1: 46.56 – 46.62 Mb	Chr 4: 115.7 – 115.74 Mb
PubMed search
- Wikidata
View/Edit Human	View/Edit Mouse

MAP kinase-interacting serine/threonine-protein kinase 1 is an enzyme that in humans is encoded by the MKNK1 gene.

== Interactions ==
MKNK1 has been shown to interact with MAPK1 and Eukaryotic translation initiation factor 4 gamma.
