= Extracellular signal-regulated kinases =

Class of enzymes

In molecular biology, extracellular signal-regulated kinases (ERKs) or classical MAP kinases are widely expressed protein kinase intracellular signalling molecules that are involved in functions including the regulation of meiosis, mitosis, and postmitotic functions in differentiated cells. Many different stimuli, including growth factors, cytokines, virus infection, ligands for heterotrimeric G protein-coupled receptors, transforming agents, and carcinogens, activate the ERK pathway.

The term, "extracellular signal-regulated kinases", is sometimes used as a synonym for mitogen-activated protein kinase (MAPK), but has more recently been adopted for a specific subset of the mammalian MAPK family.

In the MAPK/ERK pathway, Ras activates c-Raf, which in turn phosphorylates a mitogen-activated protein kinase kinase (abbreviated as MKK, MEK, or MAP2K), which subsequently phosphorylates one or more ERKs, such as MAPK1/2 (below). Ras is typically activated by growth hormones through receptor tyrosine kinases and GRB2/SOS, but may also be activated by other signals. ERKs can activate many transcription factors, such as ELK1, and other downstream protein kinases.

Disruption of the ERK pathway commonly leads to cancers, especially when caused by mutations in Ras, c-Raf, or receptors such as HER2.

== Mitogen-activated protein kinase 1 ==
mitogen-activated protein kinase 1

Identifiers
- Symbol: MAPK1
- Alt. symbols: PRKM2, PRKM1
- NCBI gene: 5594
- HGNC: 6871
- OMIM: 176948
- RefSeq: NM_002745
- UniProt: P28482

Other data
- Locus: Chr. 22 q11.2
Search for
- Structures: Swiss-model
- Domains: InterPro

Mitogen-activated protein kinase 1 (MAPK1) is also known as extracellular signal-regulated kinase 2 (ERK2). Two similar protein kinases with 85% sequence identity were originally called ERK1 and ERK2. They were found during a search for protein kinases that are rapidly phosphorylated after activation of cell surface tyrosine kinases such as the epidermal growth factor receptor. Phosphorylation of ERKs leads to the activation of their kinase activity.

The molecular events linking cell surface receptors to activation of ERKs are complex. It was found that Ras GTP-binding proteins are involved in the activation of ERKs. Another protein kinase, Raf-1, was shown to phosphorylate a "MAP kinase-kinase", thus qualifying as a "MAP kinase kinase kinase". The MAP kinase-kinase, which activates ERK, was named "MAPK/ERK kinase" (MEK).

Receptor-linked tyrosine kinases, Ras, Raf, MEK, and MAPK could be fitted into a signaling cascade linking an extracellular signal to MAPK activation. See: MAPK/ERK pathway.

Transgenic gene knockout mice lacking MAPK1 have major defects in early development. Conditional deletion of Mapk1 in B cells showed a role for MAPK1 in T-cell-dependent antibody production. A dominant gain-of-function mutant of Mapk1 in transgenic mice showed a role for MAPK1 in T-cell development. Conditional inactivation of Mapk1 in neural progenitor cells of the developing cortex lead to a reduction of cortical thickness and reduced proliferation in neural progenitor cells.

== Mitogen-activated protein kinase 3 ==
mitogen-activated protein kinase 3

Identifiers
- Symbol: MAPK3
- Alt. symbols: PRKM3
- NCBI gene: 5595
- HGNC: 6877
- OMIM: 601795
- RefSeq: NM_001040056
- UniProt: P27361

Other data
- Locus: Chr. 16 p11.2
Search for
- Structures: Swiss-model
- Domains: InterPro

Mitogen-activated protein kinase 3 (MAPK3) is also known as extracellular signal-regulated kinase 1 (ERK1). Transgenic gene knockout mice lacking MAPK3 are viable and it is thought that MAPK1 can fulfill some MAPK3 functions in most cells. The main exception is in T cells. Mice lacking MAPK3 have reduced T cell development past the CD4+ and CD8+ stage.

== Mitogen-activated protein kinase 7 ==
Mitogen-activated protein kinase 7 (MAPK7) is also known as extracellular signal-regulated kinase 5 (ERK5). Sometimes referred to as Big MAPK or BMK due to its large size in comparison to other MAPKs.

== Clinical significance ==
Activation of the ERK1/2 pathway by aberrant RAS/RAF signalling, DNA damage, and oxidative stress leads to cellular senescence. Low doses of DNA damage resulting from cancer therapy cause ERK1/2 to induce senescence, whereas higher doses of DNA damage fail to activate ERK1/2, and thus induce cell death by apoptosis.
