= Targeted therapy =

Type of therapy

Patients and their diseases are profiled in order to identify the most effective treatment for their specific case.

Targeted therapy or molecularly targeted therapy is one of the major modalities of medical treatment (pharmacotherapy) for cancer, others being hormonal therapy and cytotoxic chemotherapy. As a form of molecular medicine, targeted therapy blocks the growth of cancer cells by interfering with specific targeted molecules needed for carcinogenesis and tumor growth, rather than by simply interfering with all rapidly dividing cells (e.g. with traditional chemotherapy). Because most agents for targeted therapy are biopharmaceuticals, the term biologic therapy is sometimes synonymous with targeted therapy when used in the context of cancer therapy (and thus distinguished from chemotherapy, that is, cytotoxic therapy). However, the modalities can be combined; antibody-drug conjugates combine biologic and cytotoxic mechanisms into one targeted therapy.

Another form of targeted therapy involves the use of nanoengineered enzymes to bind to a tumor cell such that the body's natural cell degradation process can digest the cell, effectively eliminating it from the body.

Targeted cancer therapies are expected to be more effective than older forms of treatments and less harmful to normal cells. Many targeted therapies are examples of immunotherapy (using immune mechanisms for therapeutic goals) developed by the field of cancer immunology. Thus, as immunomodulators, they are one type of biological response modifiers.

The most successful targeted therapies are chemical entities that target or preferentially target a protein or enzyme that carries a mutation or other genetic alteration that is specific to cancer cells and not found in normal host tissue. One of the most successful molecular targeted therapeutics is imatinib, marketed as Gleevec, which is a kinase inhibitor with exceptional affinity for the oncofusion protein BCR-Abl which is a strong driver of tumorigenesis in chronic myelogenous leukemia. Although employed in other indications, imatinib is most effective targeting BCR-Abl. Other examples of molecular targeted therapeutics targeting mutated oncogenes, include PLX27892 which targets mutant BRAF in melanoma.

There are targeted therapies for lung cancer, colorectal cancer, head and neck cancer, breast cancer, multiple myeloma, lymphoma, prostate cancer, melanoma and other cancers.

Biomarkers are usually required to aid the selection of patients who will likely respond to a given targeted therapy.

Co-targeted therapy involves the use of one or more therapeutics aimed at multiple targets, for example PI3K and MEK, in an attempt to generate a synergistic response and prevent the development of drug resistance.

The definitive experiments that showed that targeted therapy would reverse the malignant phenotype of tumor cells involved treating Her2/neu transformed cells with monoclonal antibodies in vitro and in vivo by Mark Greene's laboratory and reported from 1985.

Some have challenged the use of the term, stating that drugs usually associated with the term are insufficiently selective. The phrase occasionally appears in scare quotes: "targeted therapy". Targeted therapies may also be described as "chemotherapy" or "non-cytotoxic chemotherapy", as "chemotherapy" strictly means only "treatment by chemicals". But in typical medical and general usage "chemotherapy" is now mostly used specifically for "traditional" cytotoxic chemotherapy.

== Types ==
The main categories of targeted therapy are currently small molecules and monoclonal antibodies.

=== Small molecules ===
Mechanism of imatinib

Many are tyrosine-kinase inhibitors.

- Imatinib (Gleevec, also known as STI–571) is approved for chronic myelogenous leukemia, gastrointestinal stromal tumor and some other types of cancer. Early clinical trials indicate that imatinib may be effective in treatment of dermatofibrosarcoma protuberans.
- Gefitinib (Iressa, also known as ZD1839), targets the epidermal growth factor receptor (EGFR) tyrosine kinase and is approved in the U.S. for non small cell lung cancer.
- Erlotinib (marketed as Tarceva). Erlotinib inhibits epidermal growth factor receptor, and works through a similar mechanism as gefitinib. Erlotinib has been shown to increase survival in metastatic non small cell lung cancer when used as second line therapy. Because of this finding, erlotinib has replaced gefitinib in this setting.
- Sorafenib (Nexavar)
- Sunitinib (Sutent)
- Dasatinib (Sprycel)
- Lapatinib (Tykerb)
- Nilotinib (Tasigna)
- Bosutinib (Bosulif)
- Ponatinib (Iclusig)
- Asciminib (Scemblix)
- Afatinib (Giotrif)
- Bortezomib (Velcade) is an apoptosis-inducing proteasome inhibitor drug that causes cancer cells to undergo cell death by interfering with proteins. It is approved in the U.S. to treat multiple myeloma that has not responded to other treatments.
- The selective estrogen receptor modulator tamoxifen has been described as the foundation of targeted therapy.
- Janus kinase inhibitors, e.g. FDA approved tofacitinib
- ALK inhibitors, e.g. crizotinib
- Bcl-2 inhibitors (e.g. FDA approved venetoclax, obatoclax in clinical trials, navitoclax, and gossypol.
- PARP inhibitors (e.g. FDA approved olaparib, rucaparib, niraparib and talazoparib)
- PI3K inhibitors (e.g. perifosine in a phase III trial)
- Apatinib is a selective VEGF Receptor 2 inhibitor which has shown encouraging anti-tumor activity in a broad range of malignancies in clinical trials. Apatinib is currently in clinical development for metastatic gastric carcinoma, metastatic breast cancer and advanced hepatocellular carcinoma.
- Zoptarelin doxorubicin (AN-152), doxorubicin linked to [D-Lys(6)]- LHRH, Phase II results for ovarian cancer.
- Braf inhibitors (vemurafenib, dabrafenib, LGX818) used to treat metastatic melanoma that harbors BRAF V600E mutation
- MEK inhibitors (trametinib, MEK162) are used in experiments, often in combination with BRAF inhibitors to treat melanoma
- CDK inhibitors, e.g. PD-0332991, LEE011 in clinical trials
- Hsp90 inhibitors, some in clinical trials
- Hedgehog pathway inhibitors (e.g. FDA approved vismodegib and sonidegib).
- Salinomycin has demonstrated potency in killing cancer stem cells in both laboratory-created and naturally occurring breast tumors in mice.
- VAL-083 (dianhydrogalactitol), a “first-in-class” DNA-targeting agent with a unique bi-functional DNA cross-linking mechanism. NCI-sponsored clinical trials have demonstrated clinical activity against a number of different cancers including glioblastoma, ovarian cancer, and lung cancer. VAL-083 is currently undergoing Phase 2 and Phase 3 clinical trials as a potential treatment for glioblastoma (GBM) and ovarian cancer. As of July 2017, four different trials of VAL-083 are registered.
- Ibrutinib blocks Bruton's tyrosine kinase (BTK) and is used to treat mantle cell lymphoma, chronic lymphocytic leukemia, and Waldenström's macroglobulinemia.

=== Small molecule drug conjugates ===
- Vintafolide is a small molecule drug conjugate consisting of a small molecule targeting the folate receptor. It is currently in clinical trials for platinum-resistant ovarian cancer (PROCEED trial) and a Phase 2b study (TARGET trial) in non-small-cell lung carcinoma (NSCLC).

=== Serine/threonine kinase inhibitors (small molecules) ===
- Temsirolimus (Torisel)
- Everolimus (Afinitor)
- Vemurafenib (Zelboraf)
- Trametinib (Mekinist)
- Dabrafenib (Tafinlar)

=== Monoclonal antibodies ===
Several are in development and a few have been licensed by the FDA and the European Commission. Examples of licensed monoclonal antibodies include:

- Pembrolizumab (Keytruda) binds to PD-1 proteins found on T cells. Pembrolizumab blocks PD-1 and help the immune system kill cancer cells. It is used to treat melanoma, Hodgkin's lymphoma, non-small cell lung carcinoma and several other types of cancer.
- Rituximab targets CD20 found on B cells. It is used in non Hodgkin lymphoma
- Trastuzumab targets the Her2/neu (also known as ErbB2) receptor expressed in some types of breast cancer
- Alemtuzumab
- Cetuximab target the epidermal growth factor receptor (EGFR). It is approved for use in the treatment of metastatic colorectal cancer and squamous cell carcinoma of the head and neck.
- Panitumumab also targets the EGFR. It is approved for the use in the treatment of metastatic colorectal cancer.
- Bevacizumab targets circulating VEGF ligand. It is approved for use in the treatment of colon cancer, breast cancer, non-small cell lung cancer, and is investigational in the treatment of sarcoma. Its use for the treatment of brain tumors has been recommended.
- Ipilimumab (Yervoy)
- Brentuximab targets CD30 and is useful in some types of lymphoma.

Many antibody-drug conjugates (ADCs) are being developed. See also antibody-directed enzyme prodrug therapy (ADEPT).

== Progress and future ==
In the U.S., the National Cancer Institute's Molecular Targets Development Program (MTDP) aims to identify and evaluate molecular targets that may be candidates for drug development. A systematic review published in Cochrane database found that targeted therapies significantly improve progression-free survival by 35 to 40% in metastatic or relapsed cancer. While the research points to promising clinical outcomes, there is still limited evidence on the long-term effects of targeted therapies in terms of overall survival, quality of life, and severe adverse events.

== See also ==
- History of cancer chemotherapy#Targeted therapy
- Targeted drug delivery
- Targeted molecular therapy for neuroblastoma
- Targeted therapy of lung cancer
- Treatment of lung cancer#Targeted therapy
- Targeted covalent inhibitors
