= Nodular melanoma =

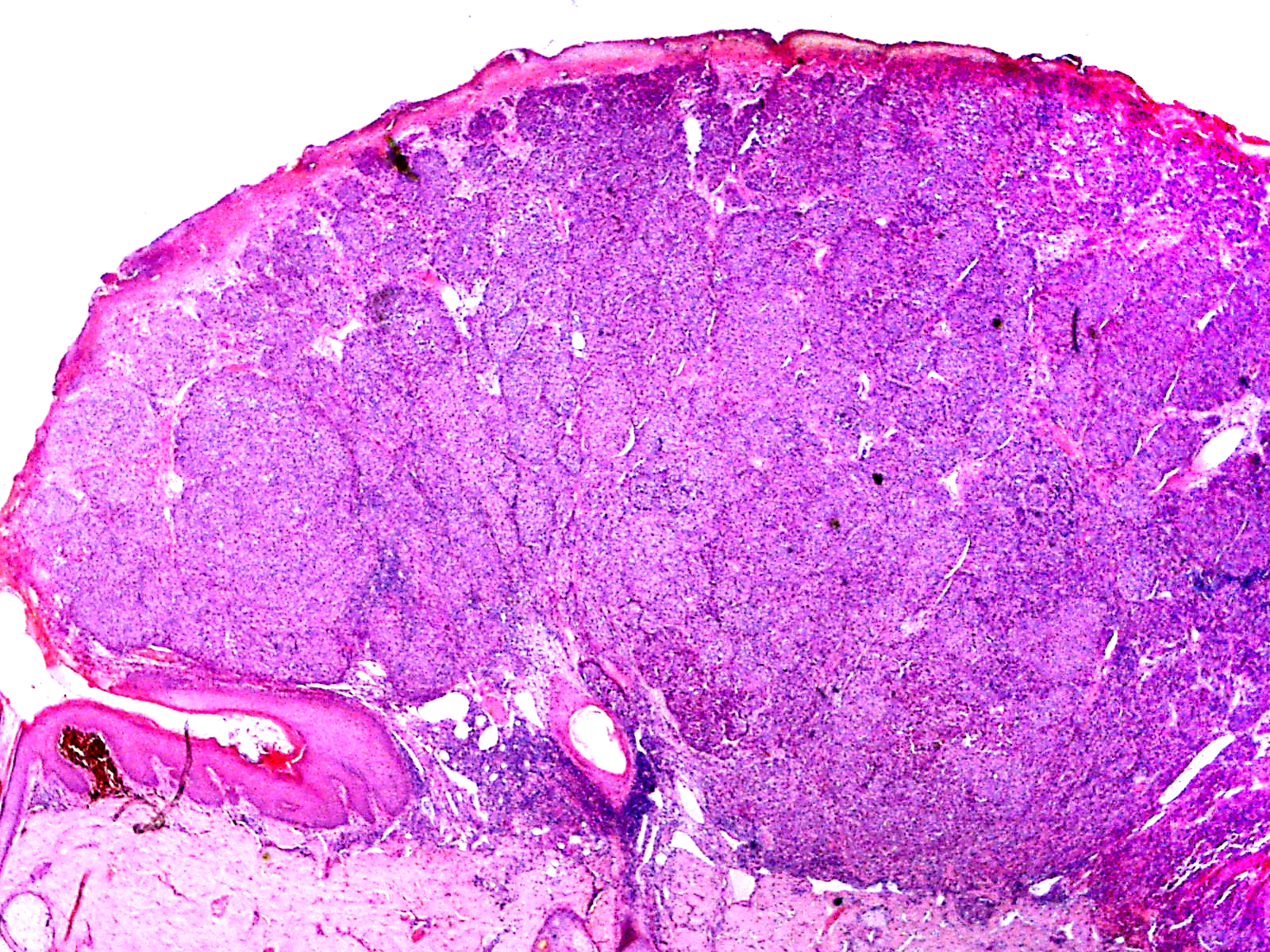
- Specialty: Oncology, dermatology

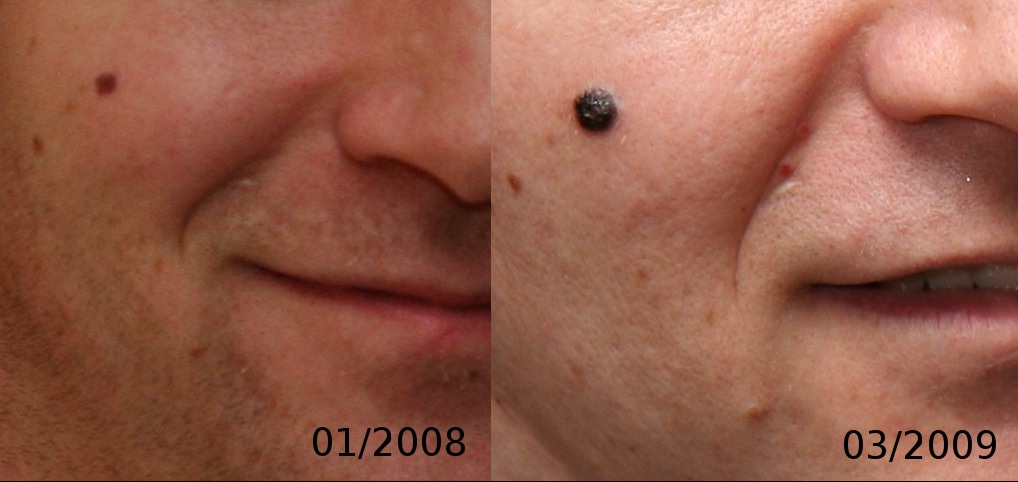
Evolution of a 4 mm nodular melanoma.

Nodular melanoma (NM) is the most aggressive form of melanoma. It tends to grow more rapidly in thickness (vertically penetrate the skin) than in diameter compared to other melanoma subtypes. Instead of arising from a pre-existing mole, it may appear in a spot where a lesion did not previously exist. Since NM tends to grow in depth more quickly than it does in width, and can occur in a place that did not have a previous lesion, the prognosis is often worse because it takes longer for a person to be aware of the changes. NM is most often darkly pigmented; however, some NM lesions can be light brown, multicolored or even colorless (non-pigmented). A light-colored or non-pigmented NM lesion may escape detection because the appearance is not alarming, however an ulcerated and/or bleeding lesion is common. Polypoid melanoma is a virulent variant of nodular melanoma.

The microscopic hallmarks are:

- Dome-shaped at low power
- Epidermis thin or normal
- Dermal nodule of melanocytes with a 'pushing' growth pattern
- No "radial growth phase"

== Treatment ==
Therapies for metastatic melanoma include the biologic immunotherapy agents ipilimumab, pembrolizumab, and nivolumab; BRAF inhibitors, such as vemurafenib and dabrafenib; and a MEK inhibitor trametinib.

== Prognosis ==
Important prognosis factors for nodular melanoma include:

- Thickness
- Ulceration
- Sentinel lymph node (SLN) status

== See also ==
- Melanoma
- Polypoid melanoma
