= C21H16ClF3N4O3 =

The molecular formula C_{21}H_{16}ClF_{3}N_{4}O_{3} may refer to:

- Donafenib
- Sorafenib
