= Polypoid melanoma =

Rare virulent form of nodular melanoma

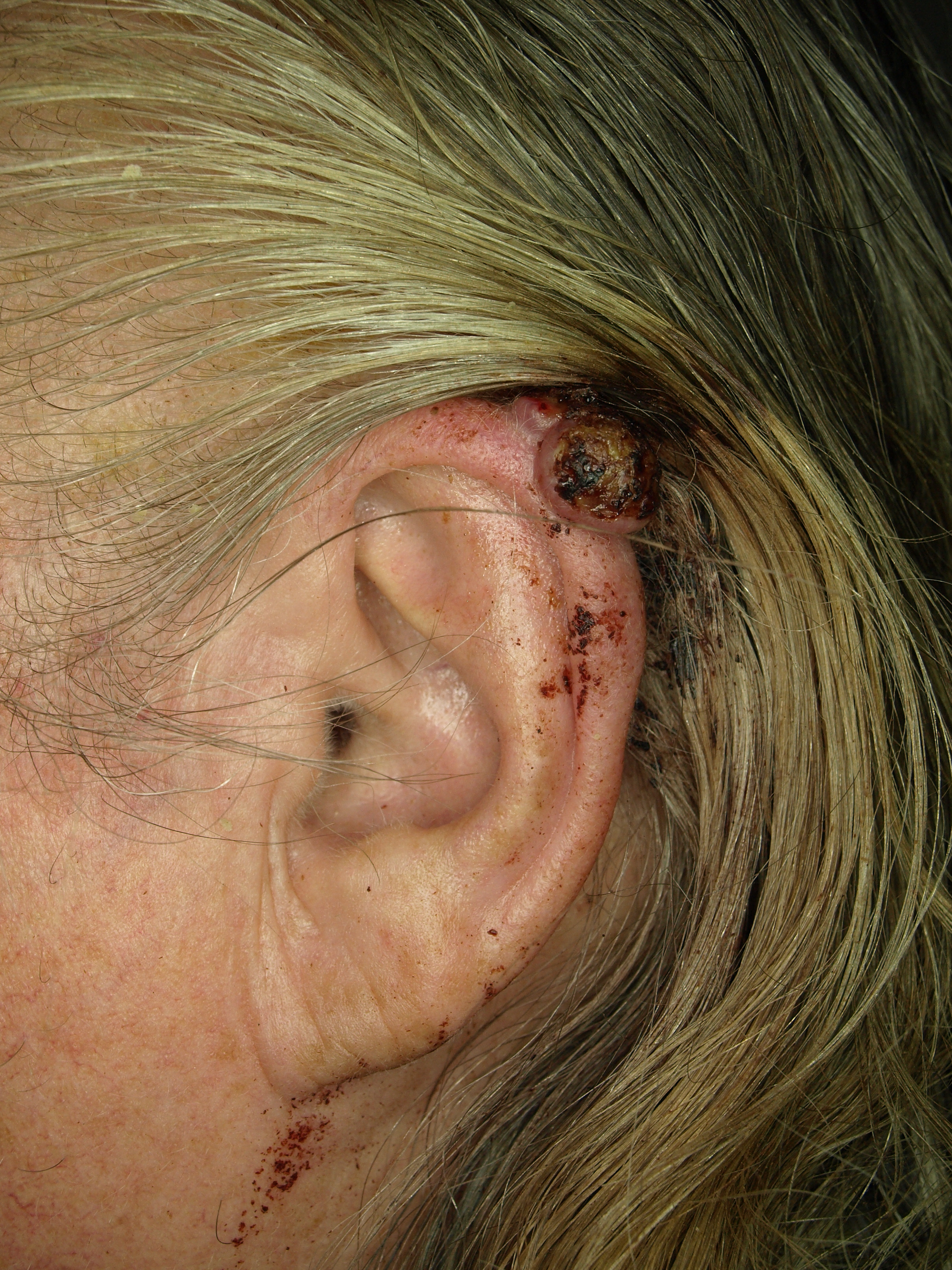
- Polypoid melanoma of the left ear in 83-year old woman.
- Specialty: Dermatology/Oncology

Polypoid melanoma is a rare cutaneous condition, a virulent variant of nodular melanoma. Polypoid melanoma is a subtype of nodular melanoma, the most aggressive form of melanoma (a skin cancer).

== Signs and symptoms ==
Polypoid melanoma is distinguished by a profile that resembles cauliflower and an uneven surface.

== Treatment ==
Therapies for metastatic melanoma include the biological immunotherapy agents ipilimumab, pembrolizumab, and nivolumab; BRAF inhibitors, such as vemurafenib and dabrafenib; and an MEK inhibitor trametinib.

== See also ==
- Melanoma
- List of cutaneous conditions
