= Targeted molecular therapy for neuroblastoma =

Targeted molecular therapy for neuroblastoma involves treatment aimed at molecular targets that have a unique expression in this form of cancer. Neuroblastoma, the second most common pediatric malignant tumor, often involves treatment through intensive chemotherapy. A number of molecular targets have been identified for the treatment of high-risk forms of this disease. Aiming treatment in this way provides a more selective way to treat the disease, decreasing the risk for toxicities that are associated with the typical treatment regimen. Treatment using these targets can supplement or replace some of the intensive chemotherapy that is used for neuroblastoma. These molecular targets of this disease include GD2, ALK, and CD133. GD2 is a target of immunotherapy, and is the most fully developed of these treatment methods, but is also associated with toxicities. ALK has more recently been discovered, and drugs in development for this target are proving to be successful in neuroblastoma treatment. The role of CD133 in neuroblastoma has also been more recently discovered and is an effective target for treatment of this disease.

== Identifying High-Risk Patients ==
High-risk cases of neuroblastoma are difficult to treat, even through intensive chemotherapy. For this reason, molecular targets have been identified and are being developed for treatment in patients who have more difficulty responding to treatment. There are a number of genetic factors that can be used to identify high-risk patients. In neuroblastoma cells, there can be amplification of genomic DNA regions, loss of genomic DNA regions, and genetic abnormalities. All of these factors can contribute to an advanced disease state in high-risk patients.

Amplification occurs within a protein called the MYCN oncogene. This protein is amplified in approximately 20% of primary neuroblastoma tumors and is associated with advanced disease state and treatment failure.

Loss of genomic regions by deletion can occur at chromosomes 1p and 11q. Loss at 1p is correlated with MYCN amplification and advanced disease state. The loss at 11q is not related to MYCN, but is correlated with adverse patient outcomes.

Genetic abnormalities frequently occur in a tumor-suppressor gene called caspase 8. Inactivation of this gene will result in tumor cell survival.

Table 1 summarizes the genomic factors used to identify high-risk patients.

Table 1. Genomic Identification of High-Risk Patients
	Genomic Location	Prevalence (in primary NB cells)	Consequences
Amplification of DNA Region	MYCN oncogene	~20%	advanced disease state treatment failure
Loss of DNA Regions	1p Chromosome	~30-35%	MYCN amplification advanced disease state
	11q Chromosome	~35-45%	adverse patient outcomes
Specific Gene Abnormality	Caspase 8 Gene	~25-35%	tumor cell survival

== Treatment Using Molecular Targets ==
=== Anti-GD2 Immunotherapy ===
GD2 is a glycolipid that is expressed on the surface of neuroblastoma cells. It is targeted through immunotherapy in neuroblastoma treatment using monoclonal antibodies. These monoclonal antibodies are used to block GD2 expression, and are thus referred to as anti-GD2 agents. They can be used for tumor-specific therapy because GD2 expression is weak and limited to certain areas in normal human tissue. Therefore, its expression can be easily targeted in tumor cells. While anti-GD2 antibodies are effective in clearing the remaining tumors in neuroblastoma patients, there have also been major toxicities associated with the use of this form of treatment. These toxicities include neuropathic pain, capillary leak syndrome, and hypersensitivity reaction. Anti-GD2 antibodies have been developed for immunotherapy treatment of neuroblastoma and can be grouped into first-generation and second-generation antibodies.

- First-Generation:
1. 14G2a
2. ch14.18
3. 3F8
- Second-Generation:
1. Hu14.18-IL-2
2. Hu14.18K332A
3. mAb1A7

All of these antibodies are going through clinical trial processes for the treatment of neuroblastoma. The most extensively studied of these antibodies is ch14.18. Through randomized trials, it has been found that treatment with ch14.18 is most effective when combined with cytokines, such as granulocyte macrophage colony-stimulating factor (GM-CSF) and interleukin-2 (IL-2). This combination therapy improves the outcome of high-risk neuroblastoma, but does not decrease the risk of toxicities. For this reason, the second-generation antibodies have been developed, which have fewer associated toxicities but are continuing trials to determine their therapeutic efficacy.

=== ALK in Familial Neuroblastoma ===
Mutations in the anaplastic lymphoma kinase (ALK) oncogene can be inherited and are a major cause of neuroblastoma. These mutations occur in approximately 5-15% of neuroblastoma cases. ALK has recently been discovered as a molecular target of chemotherapy in the treatment of neuroblastoma patients. Drugs that target ALK are referred to as ALK inhibitors. ALK is expressed on the surface of neuroblastoma tumor cells, making it easily accessible as a target for cancer treatment. In neuroblastoma patients who do not possess a mutated form of ALK, targeting the non-mutated form of ALK on a tumor cell can also be beneficial. This will cause the tumor to undergo apoptosis, which is programmed cell death. ALK inhibitors can also be used to treat another cause of neuroblastoma referred to as MYCN gene amplification. Amplification of the MYCN protein is a genetic mutation associated with neuroblastoma tumors. MYCN amplification is correlated with a specific mutation in ALK, referred to as the F1174L mutation. ALK inhibitors can target this mutation and suppress the MYCN protein in the tumor cell.

The following is a list of ALK inhibitors currently in clinical trials for treatment of neuroblastoma:

- Crizotinib (Pfizer)
- CH5424802 (Chugai Pharmaceutical Co.)
- ASP3026 (Astellas Pharma Inc.)
- Ceritinib (LDK378, Novartis Pharmaceuticals)
- AP26113 (Ariad Pharmaceuticals)

Crizotinib was the first of these drugs to enter clinical trials and is the sole available ALK inhibitor, approved by the FDA on August 26, 2011. Thus far, it has proven its efficacy in treating adults with non-small-cell lung carcinoma (NSCLC), another form of cancer in which ALK plays a role. The drug is currently in phase III clinical trials to test its use in treating pediatric cancer types, such as neuroblastoma.

CH542802 is currently in phase I/II trials and is being shown to inhibit the growth of neuroblastoma cells with the amplified expression of ALK.

ASP3026 is in phase I trials for ALK-related malignancies. It is currently being tested in adults but also can be a viable treatment for neuroblastoma due to its ALK inhibiting characteristics.

Ceritinib was approved by the FDA in April 2014 for treatment of ALK-positive metastatic non-small cell lung cancer. Like crizotinib, it has proven to be efficacious in adults and is also being tested for its efficacy in pediatric neuroblastoma cells.

AP26113 is a dual inhibitor of ALK and epidermal growth factor receptor. It is going through phase I/II clinical trials for treatment of neuroblastoma and NSCLC.

=== CD133 Biomarker ===
CD133 is shown to be a marker of tumor-initiating or cancer stem cells in neuroblastoma. The tumor-initiating properties of CD133 have been discovered through studies such as the one performed by Cournoyer et al. The cells from neuroblastoma patients have been examined, comparing those with a high expression of the CD133 glycoprotein to those with a low expression of CD133. The following are the characteristics of high-expression CD133 that provide evidence for its tumor-initiating properties:

- Increased neurosphere formation
- Large neurosphere size
- Increased colony formation
- Tumor formation when injected into mice
- Presence of genetic abnormalities

The tumor-initiating properties of CD133 provide evidence for it to be a practical target of chemotherapeutic treatment for neuroblastoma. Through genotype analysis CD133 expression is found to be associated with the expression of the EFNA2 protein. This protein can play a role in cancer development. It is expressed in stem cells and can promote the formation of tumors. For these reasons, it can also be used for chemotherapy treatment in neuroblastoma patients. Through genotype analysis, the presence of this protein can be detected in neuroblastoma patients who also have high-expression CD133. In developing drugs for the treatment of neuroblastoma, pharmaceutical companies are experimenting with the use of CD133 and the associated EFNA2 protein as targets.
