= Centromere protein O =

Protein found in humans

CENPO

Identifiers
- Aliases: CENPO, CENP-O, ICEN-36, MCM21R, centromere protein O
- External IDs: OMIM: 611504; MGI: 1923800; GeneCards: CENPO

Gene location (Human)
Chr.	Chromosome 2 (human)
Band	2p23.3	Start	24,793,136 bp
Band	2p23.3	End	24,822,376 bp

Gene location (Mouse)
Chr.	Chromosome 12 (mouse)
Band	12 A1.1|12 2.02 cM	Start	4,246,004 bp
Band	12 A1.1|12 2.02 cM	End	4,284,294 bp
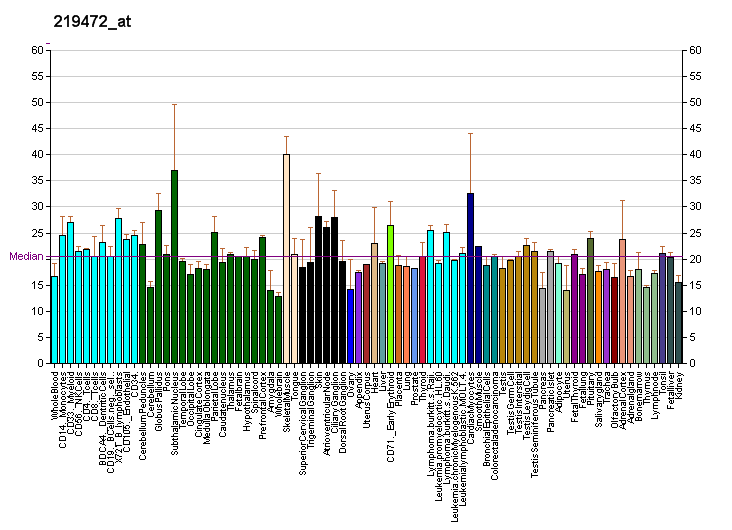
RNA expression pattern
Bgee	Human / Mouse (ortholog); Top expressed in: ventricular zone; ganglionic eminence; testicle; gonad; secondary oocyte; left testis; right testis; stromal cell of endometrium; mucosa of transverse colon; right adrenal cortex / Top expressed in: primary oocyte; zygote; secondary oocyte; otic vesicle; spermatocyte; otic placode; saccule; lumbar subsegment of spinal cord; Paneth cell; primitive streak; More reference expression data
BioGPS	More reference expression data
Gene ontology
Molecular function	protein binding
Cellular component	chromosome; cytosol; chromosome, centromeric region; kinetochore; nucleoplasm; nucleus; Mis6-Sim4 complex
Biological process	centromere complex assembly; CENP-A containing chromatin assembly
Sources:Amigo / QuickGO
Orthologs
Databases	NCBI: entry; OMA: entry
Species	Human	Mouse
Entrez	79172	52504
Ensembl	ENSG00000138092	ENSMUSG00000020652
UniProt	Q9BU64	Q8K015
RefSeq (mRNA)	NM_001199803; NM_024322; NM_001322101	NM_134046; NM_001361641
RefSeq (protein)	NP_001186732; NP_001309030; NP_077298	NP_598807; NP_001348570
Location (UCSC)	Chr 2: 24.79 – 24.82 Mb	Chr 12: 4.25 – 4.28 Mb
PubMed search
- Wikidata
View/Edit Human	View/Edit Mouse

Centromere protein O is a protein that in humans is encoded by the CENPO gene. CENPO is involved in cell proliferation and cell cycle progression and has been shown to be down-regulated in trisomic neurospheres a mouse model of Down Syndrome, resulting in reduced numbers of neural progenitors and neuroblasts and a severe reduction in numbers of neurons produced.
