= Polypoid =

Polypoid means relating to or similar to a polyp, and may refer to:

== Medicine ==
- Polypoid melanoma
- Atypical polypoid adenomyoma
- Polypoid basal-cell carcinoma

== Other uses ==
- Organisms that form siphonophores

== See also ==
- Polyploid
