= Zoptarelin doxorubicin =

Chemical compound

Clinical data
- Other names: AEZS-108; AN-152
- ATC code: None

Legal status
- Legal status: Investigational

Identifiers
- IUPAC name: [2-[(2S,4S)-4-[(2R,4S,5S,6S)-4-amino-5-hydroxy-6-methyl-tetrahydropyran-2-yl]oxy-2,5,12-trihydroxy-7-methoxy-6,11-dioxo-3,4-dihydro-1H-tetracen-2-yl]-2-oxo-ethyl] 5-[[(5R)-6-[[(1S)-1-[[(1S)-1-[(2S)-2-[(2-amino-2-oxo-ethyl)carbamoyl]pyrrolidine-1-carbonyl]-4-guanidino-butyl]carbamoyl]-3-methyl-butyl]amino]-5-[[(2S)-2-[[(2S)-3-hydroxy-2-[[(2S)-2-[[(2S)-3-(1H-imidazol-5-yl)-2-[[(2S)-5-oxopyrrolidine-2-carbonyl]amino]propanoyl]amino]-3-(1H-indol-3-yl)propanoyl]amino]propanoyl]amino]-3-(4-hydroxyphenyl)propanoyl]amino]-6-oxo-hexyl]amino]-5-oxo-pentanoate
- CAS Number: 139570-93-7
- PubChem CID: 16134409
- DrugBank: DB12755
- ChemSpider: 17290938
- UNII: 27844X2J29
- CompTox Dashboard (EPA): DTXSID50161110
- ECHA InfoCard: 100.244.989

Chemical and physical data
- Formula: C_{91}H_{117}N_{19}O_{26}
- Molar mass: 1893.044 g·mol^{−1}
- 3D model (JSmol): Interactive image
- SMILES: CC1C(C(CC(O1)OC2CC(Cc3c2c(c4c(c3O)C(=O)c5cccc(c5C4=O)OC)O)(C(=O)COC(=O)CCCC(=O)NCCCCC(C(=O)NC(CC(C)C)C(=O)NC(CCCNC(=N)N)C(=O)N6CCCC6C(=O)NCC(=O)N)NC(=O)C(Cc7ccc(cc7)O)NC(=O)C(CO)NC(=O)C(Cc8c[nH]c9c8cccc9)NC(=O)C(Cc1cnc[nH]1)NC(=O)C1CCC(=O)N1)O)N)O
- InChI: InChI=1S/C91H117N19O26/c1-44(2)31-58(83(125)104-57(17-11-29-98-90(94)95)89(131)110-30-12-18-63(110)88(130)100-40-67(93)114)105-81(123)55(16-7-8-28-97-68(115)20-10-21-70(117)134-42-66(113)91(132)36-52-73(65(37-91)136-71-35-53(92)76(118)45(3)135-71)80(122)75-74(78(52)120)77(119)51-14-9-19-64(133-4)72(51)79(75)121)103-84(126)59(32-46-22-24-49(112)25-23-46)106-87(129)62(41-111)109-85(127)60(33-47-38-99-54-15-6-5-13-50(47)54)107-86(128)61(34-48-39-96-43-101-48)108-82(124)56-26-27-69(116)102-56/h5-6,9,13-15,19,22-25,38-39,43-45,53,55-63,65,71,76,99,111-112,118,120,122,132H,7-8,10-12,16-18,20-21,26-37,40-42,92H2,1-4H3,(H2,93,114)(H,96,101)(H,97,115)(H,100,130)(H,102,116)(H,103,126)(H,104,125)(H,105,123)(H,106,129)(H,107,128)(H,108,124)(H,109,127)(H4,94,95,98)/t45-,53-,55+,56-,57-,58-,59-,60-,61-,62-,63-,65-,71-,76+,91-/m0/s1; Key:OOUACICUAVTCEC-LZHWUUGESA-N

Zoptarelin doxorubicin (developmental code names AEZS-108, AN-152) consists of doxorubicin linked to a small peptide agonist to the luteinizing hormone-releasing hormone (LHRH) receptor. It has been developed as a potential treatment for a number of human cancers. The LHRH receptor is aberrantly present on the cell surface of approximately 80% of endometrial and ovarian cancers, 86% of prostate cancers and about 50% of breast cancers. Whereas in normal tissues, expression of this receptor is mainly confined to the pituitary gland, reproductive organs and hematopoietic stem cells. To a lesser extent the LHRH receptor is also found on the surface of bladder, colorectal, and pancreatic cancers, sarcomas, lymphomas, melanomas, and renal cell carcinomas.

The proposed method of action is that upon administration zoptarelin doxorubicin binds to the LHRH receptor and is subsequently internalized, concentrating the toxic doxorubicin within cancer cells and the small subset of normal tissues, as opposed to the completely systemic distribution observed with untargeted chemotherapeutics. The specific targeting of the doxorubicin to LHRH receptor bearing cells is also proposed to reduce the cardiotoxicity observed in the administration of unconjugated doxorubicin.

Zoptarelin doxorubicin was invented by Andrew V. Schally while at the Tulane University School of Medicine, New Orleans and subsequently at the Sylvester Comprehensive Cancer Center, University of Miami. It has been subsequently developed by AEterna Zentaris Inc. In June 2016, Aeterna stated that it plans to submit an NDA to the FDA by mid 2017. Zoptarelin doxorubicin was discontinued for all indications under development in May 2017.

The U.S. Food and Drug Administration (FDA) has granted it orphan drug status for ovarian cancer and endometrial cancer.

== Clinical trials ==
Promising results have been reported from a phase II clinical trial for ovarian cancer and endometrial cancer. Phase II trials have also been undertaken for prostate, breast and bladder cancer, although no results for these trials have been reported in peer-reviewed literature. A phase I trial in prostate cancer indicated that nine out ten evaluable patients achieved disease stabilization through administration of zoptarelin doxorubicin.

A phase III trial for endometrial cancer was initiated in April 2013 and it the primary completion date is estimated to be December 2016. In May 2017 the results were disclosed, showing that the drug did not extend overall survival nor did it improve the safety profile compared to doxorubicin.
