= Donafenib =

Cancer medication

Clinical data
- Trade names: Zepsun
- Other names: CM-4307

Legal status
- Legal status: Rx in China

Identifiers
- IUPAC name: 4-[4-[[4-Chloro-3-(trifluoromethyl)phenyl]carbamoylamino]phenoxy]-N-(trideuteriomethyl)pyridine-2-carboxamide
- CAS Number: 1130115-44-4
- PubChem CID: 25191001
- DrugBank: DB15414
- ChemSpider: 23937167
- UNII: 41XGO0VS1U
- ChEMBL: ChEMBL4297490
- CompTox Dashboard (EPA): DTXSID90648995

Chemical and physical data
- Formula: C_{21}H_{16}ClD_{3}F_{3}N_{4}O_{3}
- Molar mass: 470.87 g·mol^{−1}
- 3D model (JSmol): Interactive image
- SMILES: [2H]C([2H])([2H])NC(=O)C1=NC=CC(=C1)OC2=CC=C(C=C2)NC(=O)NC3=CC(=C(C=C3)Cl)C(F)(F)F
- InChI: InChI=1S/C21H16ClF3N4O3/c1-26-19(30)18-11-15(8-9-27-18)32-14-5-2-12(3-6-14)28-20(31)29-13-4-7-17(22)16(10-13)21(23,24)25/h2-11H,1H3,(H,26,30)(H2,28,29,31)/i1D3; Key:MLDQJTXFUGDVEO-FIBGUPNXSA-N

Donafenib, sold under the brand name Zepsun, is a pharmaceutical drug for the treatment of cancer.

In China, donafenib is approved for the treatment of unresectable hepatocellular carcinoma in patients who have not previously received systemic treatment.

Donafenib is a kinase inhibitor that targets Raf kinase and various receptor tyrosine kinases. It is a deuterated derivative of sorafenib with improved pharmacokinetic properties.
