= Sorafenib =

Cancer treatment medicine

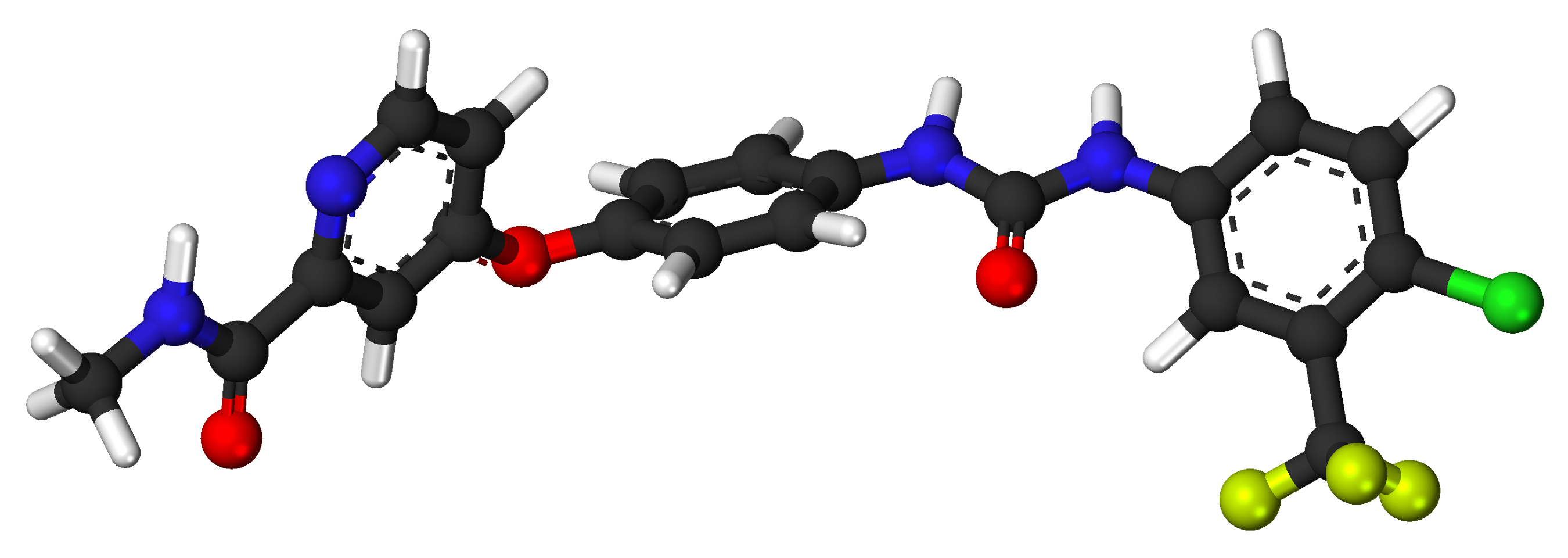

Clinical data
- Trade names: Nexavar, others
- Other names: Sorafenib tosylate
- AHFS/Drugs.com: Monograph
- MedlinePlus: a607051
- License data: EU EMA: by INN; US DailyMed: Sorafenib; US FDA: Sorafenib
- Pregnancy category: AU: D
- Routes of administration: By mouth
- ATC code: L01EX02 (WHO)

Legal status
- Legal status: AU: S4 (Prescription only); CA: ℞-only; UK: POM (Prescription only); US: ℞-only; EU: Rx-only

Pharmacokinetic data
- Bioavailability: 38–49%
- Protein binding: 99.5%
- Metabolism: Liver oxidation and glucuronidation (CYP3A4 & UGT1A9-mediated)
- Elimination half-life: 25–48 hours
- Excretion: Feces (77%) and urine (19%)

Identifiers
- IUPAC name: 4-[4-[[4-chloro-3-(trifluoromethyl)phenyl]carbamoylamino] phenoxy]-N-methyl-pyridine-2-carboxamide
- CAS Number: 284461-73-0
- PubChem CID: 216239
- IUPHAR/BPS: 5711
- DrugBank: DB00398
- ChemSpider: 187440
- UNII: 9ZOQ3TZI87
- KEGG: D08524; D06272
- ChEBI: CHEBI:50924
- ChEMBL: ChEMBL1336
- PDB ligand: BAX (PDBe, RCSB PDB)
- CompTox Dashboard (EPA): DTXSID7041128
- ECHA InfoCard: 100.110.083

Chemical and physical data
- Formula: C_{21}H_{16}ClF_{3}N_{4}O_{3}
- Molar mass: 464.83 g·mol^{−1}
- 3D model (JSmol): Interactive image
- SMILES: CNC(=O)c1cc(ccn1)Oc2ccc(cc2)NC(=O)Nc3ccc(c(c3)C(F)(F)F)Cl
- InChI: InChI=1S/C21H16ClF3N4O3/c1-26-19(30)18-11-15(8-9-27-18)32-14-5-2-12(3-6-14)28-20(31)29-13-4-7-17(22)16(10-13)21(23,24)25/h2-11H,1H3,(H,26,30)(H2,28,29,31); Key:MLDQJTXFUGDVEO-UHFFFAOYSA-N

Sorafenib, sold under the brand name Nexavar, is a kinase inhibitor drug approved for the treatment of primary kidney cancer (advanced renal cell carcinoma), advanced primary liver cancer (hepatocellular carcinoma), FLT3-ITD positive AML and radioactive iodine resistant advanced thyroid carcinoma.

== Mechanism of action ==
Sorafenib is a protein kinase inhibitor with activity against many protein kinases, including VEGFR, PDGFR and RAF kinases. Of the RAF kinases, sorafenib is more selective for c-Raf than B-RAF. (See BRAF (gene)#Sorafenib for details the drug's interaction with B-Raf.)

Sorafenib treatment induces autophagy, which may suppress tumor growth. Based on its 1,3-disubstituted urea structure, sorafenib is also a potent soluble epoxide hydrolase inhibitor and this activity likely reduces the severity of its adverse effects.

== Medical uses ==
Sorafenib is indicated as a treatment for advanced renal cell carcinoma (RCC), unresectable hepatocellular carcinomas (HCC), thyroid cancer and Acute Myeloid Leukaemia with FLT3-ITD mutation..

=== Kidney cancer ===
Clinical trial results, published January 2007, showed that, compared with placebo, treatment with sorafenib prolongs progression-free survival in patients with advanced clear cell renal cell carcinoma in whom previous therapy has failed. The median progression-free survival was 5.5 months in the sorafenib group and 2.8 months in the placebo group (hazard ratio for disease progression in the sorafenib group, 0.44; 95% confidence interval [CI], 0.35 to 0.55; P<0.01).

In Australia this is one of two TGA-labelled indications for sorafenib, although it is not listed on the Pharmaceutical Benefits Scheme for this indication.

=== Liver cancer ===
At ASCO 2007, results from the SHARP trial were presented, which showed efficacy of sorafenib in hepatocellular carcinoma. The primary endpoint was median overall survival, which showed a 44% improvement in patients who received sorafenib compared to placebo (hazard ratio 0.69; 95% CI, 0.55 to 0.87; p=0.0001). Both median survival and time to progression showed 3-month improvements; however, there was no significant difference in median time to symptomatic progression (p=0.77). There was no difference in quality of life measures, possibly attributable to toxicity of sorafenib or symptoms related to underlying progression of liver disease. Of note, this trial only included patients with Child-Pugh Class A (i.e. mildest) cirrhosis. Because of this trial sorafenib obtained FDA approval for the treatment of advanced hepatocellular carcinoma in November 2007.

In a randomized, double-blind, phase II trial combining sorafenib with doxorubicin, the median time to progression was not significantly delayed compared with doxorubicin alone in patients with advanced hepatocellular carcinoma. Median durations of overall survival and progression-free survival were significantly longer in patients receiving sorafenib plus doxorubicin than in those receiving doxorubicin alone.

A prospective single-centre phase II study which included the patients with unresectable hepatocellular carcinoma (HCC) concluding that the combination of sorafenib and DEB-TACE in patients with unresectable HCC is well tolerated and safe, with most toxicities related to sorafenib.

In Australia this is the only indication for which sorafenib is listed on the PBS and hence the only government-subsidised indication for sorafenib. Along with renal cell carcinoma, hepatocellular carcinoma is one of the TGA-labelled indications for sorafenib.

=== Thyroid cancer ===
On 22 November 2013, sorafenib was approved by the FDA for the treatment of locally recurrent or metastatic, progressive differentiated thyroid carcinoma (DTC) refractory to radioactive iodine treatment.

The phase III DECISION trial showed significant improvement in progression-free survival but not in overall survival. However, as is known, the side effects were very frequent, specially hand and foot skin reaction.

=== Acute Myeloid Leukaemia ===
In patients with FLT3-ITD mutated AML, sorafenib can be used as a maintenance therapy post-Allogeneic haematopoietic stem-cell transplantation to target any residual disease that could remain in the bone marrow.

== Adverse effects ==
Adverse effects by frequency
Note: Potentially serious side effects are in bold.
Very common (>10% frequency)

- Lymphopenia
- **Hypophosphataemia** (Note: Low blood phosphate levels)
- **Haemorrhage** (Note: Bleeding; including serious bleeds such as intracranial and intrapulmonary bleeds)
- Hypertension (Note: High blood pressure)
- Diarrhea
- Rash
- Alopecia (hair loss; occurs in roughly 30% of patients receiving sorafenib)
- Hand-foot syndrome
- Pruritus (itchiness)
- Erythema
- Increased amylase
- Increased lipase
- Fatigue
- Pain (Note: Including abdominal pain, headache, tumour pain, etc.)
- Nausea
- Vomiting (Note: Considered a low (~10-30%) risk chemotherapeutic agent for causing emesis))

Common (1-10% frequency)

- **Leucopenia** (Note: Low level of white blood cells in the blood)
- **Neutropoenia** (Note: Low level of neutrophils in the blood)
- **Anaemia** (Note: Low level of red blood cells in the blood)
- **Thrombocytopenia** (Note: Low level of plasma cells in the blood)
- Anorexia (weight loss)
- **Hypocalcaemia** (Note: Low blood calcium)
- **Hypokalaemia** (Note: Low blood potassium)
- **Depression**
- Peripheral sensory neuropathy
- Tinnitus (Note: Hearing ringing in the ears)
- **Congestive heart failure**
- **Myocardial infarction** (Note: Heart attack)
- **Myocardial ischaemia** (Note: Lack of blood supply for the heart muscle)
- Hoarseness
- Constipation
- Stomatitis (Note: Mouth swelling, also dry mouth and glossodynia)
- Dyspepsia (Note: Indigestion)
- Dysphagia (Note: Not being able to swallow)
- Dry skin
- Exfoliative dermatitis
- Acne
- Skin desquamation
- Arthralgia (Note: Sore joints)
- Myalgia (Note: Muscle aches)
- **Kidney failure** (Note: Kidney failure)
- Proteinuria (Note: Excreting protein [usually plasma proteins] in the urine. Not dangerous in itself but it is indicative kidney damage)
- Erectile dysfunction
- Asthenia (weakness)
- Fever
- Influenza-like illness
- Transient increase in transaminase

Uncommon (0.1-1% frequency)

- Folliculitis
- **Infection**
- Hypersensitivity reactions (Note: Including skin reactions and urticaria (hives))
- **Hypothyroidism** (Note: Underactive thyroid)
- **Hyperthyroidism** (Note: Overactive thyroid)
- **Hyponatraemia** (Note: Low blood sodium)
- **Dehydration**
- **Reversible posterior leukoencephalopathy**
- **Hypertensive crisis**
- Rhinorrhoea (Note: Runny nose)
- **Interstitial lung disease-like events** (Note: Pneumonitis, radiation pneumonitis, acute respiratory distress, etc.)
- Gastro-oesophageal reflux disease (GORD)
- **Pancreatitis** (Note: Swelling of the pancreas)
- **Gastritis** (Note: Swelling of the stomach)
- **Gastrointestinal perforations** (Note: Formation of a hole in the gastrointestinal tract, leading to potentially fatal bleeds)
- Increase in bilirubin leading, potentially, to jaundice (Note: Yellowing of the skin and eyes due to a failure of the liver to adequately cope with the amount of bilirubin produced by the day-to-day actions of the body)
- **Cholecystitis** (Note: Swelling of the gallbladder)
- **Cholangitis** (Note: Swelling of the bile duct)
- Eczema
- **Erythema multiforme** (Note: A potentially fatal skin reaction)
- **Keratoacanthoma** (Note: A fairly benign form of skin cancer)
- **Squamous cell carcinoma**
- Gynaecomastia (swelling of the breast tissue in men)
- **Transient increase in blood alkaline phosphatase**
- **INR abnormal**
- **Prothrombin level abnormal**
- **bulbous skin reaction**

Rare (0.01-0.1% frequency)

- **QT interval prolongation** (Note: A potentially fatal abnormality in the electrical activity of the heart)
- **Angiooedema** (Note: Swelling of the skin and mucous membranes)
- **Anaphylactic reaction** (Note: A potentially fatal allergic reaction)
- **Hepatitis** (Note: Swelling of the liver)
- Radiation recall dermatitis
- **Stevens–Johnson syndrome**
- **Leucocytoclastic vasculitis**
- **Toxic epidermal necrolysis**
- **Nephrotic syndrome**
- **Rhabdomyolysis** (Note: The rapid breakdown of muscle tissue leading to the build-up of myoglobin in the blood and resulting in damage to the kidneys)

== History ==
=== Renal cancer ===
Sorafenib was approved by the U.S. Food and Drug Administration (FDA) in December 2005, and received European Commission marketing authorization in July 2006, both for use in the treatment of advanced renal cancer.

=== Liver cancer ===
The European Commission granted marketing authorization to the drug for the treatment of patients with hepatocellular carcinoma(HCC), the most common form of liver cancer, in October 2007, and FDA approval for this indication followed in November 2007.

In November 2009, the UK's National Institute for Clinical Excellence declined to approve the drug for use within the NHS in England, Wales and Northern Ireland, stating that its effectiveness (increasing survival in primary liver cancer by 6 months) did not justify its high price, at up to £3000 per patient per month. In Scotland the drug had already been refused authorization by the Scottish Medicines Consortium for use within NHS Scotland, for the same reason.

In March 2012, the Indian Patent Office granted a domestic company, Natco Pharma, a license to manufacture generic sorafenib, bringing its price down by 97%. Bayer sells a month's supply, 120 tablets, of Nexavar for₹280,000 (US$2,900). Natco Pharma will sell 120 tablets for ₹8,800 (US$91), while still paying a 6% royalty to Bayer. The royalty was later raised to 7% on appeal by Bayer. Under the Patents Act, 1970 and the World Trade Organisation TRIPS Agreement, the government can issue a compulsory license when a drug is not available at an affordable price.

== Society and culture ==
=== Nexavar controversy ===
In January 2014, Bayer's CEO Marijn Dekkers allegedly stated that Nexavar was developed for "Western patients who can afford it, not for Indians". A kidney cancer patient would pay $96,000 (£58,000) for a year's course of the Bayer-made drug, whereas the cost of the Indian version of the generic drug would be around $2,800 (£1,700).

== Research ==
=== Lung ===
In some kinds of lung cancer (with squamous-cell histology) sorafenib administered in addition to paclitaxel and carboplatin may be detrimental to patients.

=== Ovarian cancer ===
Sorafenib has been studied as maintenance therapy after ovarian cancer treatment and in combination with chemotherapy for recurrent ovarian cancer but did not show results that led to approval of the drug for these indications.

=== Brain (recurrent glioblastoma) ===
There is a phase I/II study at the Mayo Clinic of sorafenib and CCI-779 (temsirolimus) for recurrent glioblastoma.

=== Desmoid tumor (aggressive fibromatosis) ===
A study performed in 2008 showed that sorafenib is active against aggressive fibromatosis. This study is being used as justification for using sorafenib as an initial course of treatment in some patients with the condition.

A phase III clinical trial is testing the effectiveness of sorafenib to treat desmoid tumors (also known as aggressive fibromatosis), after positive results in the first two trial stages. Dosage is typically half of that applied for malignant cancers (400 mg vs 800 mg). NCI are sponsoring this trial.

== See also ==
- Donafenib, a deuterated derivative of sorafenib with improved pharmacokinetic properties
