= BRAF (gene) =

Protein-coding gene in humans

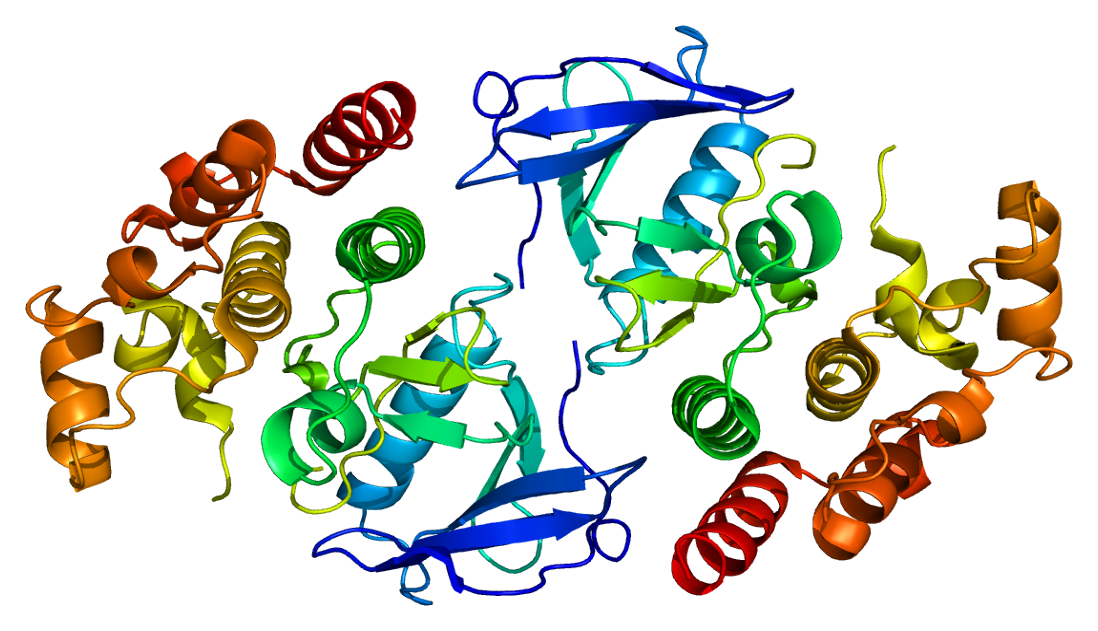

Identifiers
- Aliases: BRAF, B-RAF1, BRAF1, NS7, RAFB1, B-Raf, B-Raf proto-oncogene, serine/threonine kinase
- External IDs: OMIM: 164757; MGI: 88190; GeneCards: BRAF
Available structures
PDB	Ortholog search: PDBe RCSB
PDB	List of PDB id codes 1UWH, 1UWJ, 2FB8, 2L05, 3C4C, 3D4Q, 3IDP, 3II5, 3NY5, 3OG7, 3PPJ, 3PPK, 3PRF, 3PRI, 3PSB, 3PSD, 3Q4C, 3Q96, 3SKC, 3TV4, 3TV6, 4DBN, 4E26, 4E4X, 4EHE, 4EHG, 4FC0, 4FK3, 4G9C, 4G9R, 4H58, 4JVG, 4KSP, 4KSQ, 4MBJ, 4MNE, 4MNF, 4PP7, 4WO5, 5C9C, 5CT7, 4XV2, 4XV1, 4XV9, 4XV3, 4R5Y, 5CSW, 5CSX, 4YHT, 5J2R, 5FD2, 5HIE, 5HID, 5HI2, 4CQE, 5J18
Enzyme activity
EC #	BRENDA	ExPASy	KEGG	MetaCyc
2.7.11.1	↗	↗	↗	↗

Gene location (Human)
Chr.	Chromosome 7 (human)
Band	7q34	Start	140,719,327 bp
Band	7q34	End	140,924,928 bp

Gene location (Mouse)
Chr.	Chromosome 6 (mouse)
Band	6 B1|6 18.43 cM	Start	39,580,171 bp
Band	6 B1|6 18.43 cM	End	39,702,397 bp
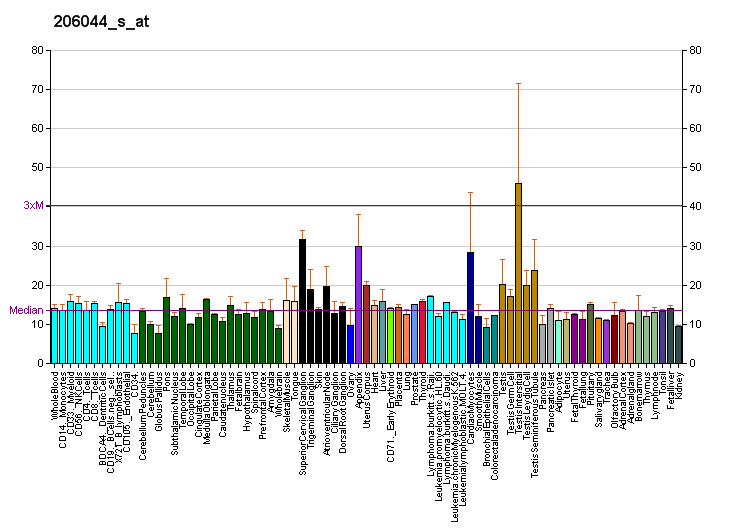
RNA expression pattern
Bgee	Human / Mouse (ortholog); Top expressed in: buccal mucosa cell; epithelium of colon; Achilles tendon; middle temporal gyrus; sperm; sural nerve; testicle; lateral nuclear group of thalamus; postcentral gyrus; left testis / Top expressed in: tail of embryo; hair follicle; olfactory tubercle; pineal gland; nucleus accumbens; medial dorsal nucleus; subiculum; dorsal striatum; epithelium of lens; transitional epithelium of urinary bladder; More reference expression data
BioGPS	More reference expression data
Gene ontology
Molecular function	protein kinase activity; calcium ion binding; nucleotide binding; transferase activity; metal ion binding; kinase activity; protein serine/threonine kinase activity; small GTPase binding; protein binding; identical protein binding; ATP binding; MAP kinase kinase kinase activity; mitogen-activated protein kinase kinase binding; protein heterodimerization activity
Cellular component	intracellular membrane-bounded organelle; membrane; nucleus; intracellular anatomical structure; cytoplasm; cytosol; plasma membrane; mitochondrion; neuron projection; cell body
Biological process	cellular response to calcium ion; intracellular signal transduction; phosphorylation; establishment of protein localization to membrane; negative regulation of apoptotic process; positive regulation of peptidyl-serine phosphorylation; protein phosphorylation; animal organ morphogenesis; signal transduction; negative regulation of signal transduction; positive regulation of glucose transmembrane transport; trehalose metabolism in response to stress; MAPK cascade; positive regulation of gene expression; cell differentiation; positive regulation of ERK1 and ERK2 cascade; myeloid progenitor cell differentiation; visual learning; negative regulation of fibroblast migration; thyroid gland development; somatic stem cell population maintenance; regulation of cell population proliferation; CD4-positive, alpha-beta T cell differentiation; positive T cell selection; CD4-positive or CD8-positive, alpha-beta T cell lineage commitment; response to peptide hormone; negative regulation of neuron apoptotic process; regulation of T cell differentiation; alpha-beta T cell differentiation; thymus development; regulation of axon regeneration; positive regulation of axon regeneration; positive regulation of axonogenesis; T cell receptor signaling pathway; protein heterooligomerization; positive regulation of stress fiber assembly; response to cAMP; long-term potentiation; head morphogenesis; face development; positive regulation of substrate adhesion-dependent cell spreading; cellular response to nerve growth factor stimulus; negative regulation of synaptic vesicle exocytosis; negative regulation of endothelial cell apoptotic process
Sources:Amigo / QuickGO
Orthologs
Databases	NCBI: entry; OMA: entry
Species	Human	Mouse
Entrez	673	109880
Ensembl	ENSG00000157764	ENSMUSG00000002413
UniProt	P15056	P28028
RefSeq (mRNA)	NM_004333; NM_001354609; NM_001374244; NM_001374258	NM_139294
RefSeq (protein)	NP_004324; NP_001341538; NP_001361173; NP_001361187; NP_001365396 NP_001365397; NP_001365398; NP_001365399; NP_001365400; NP_001365401; NP_001365402; NP_001365403; NP_001365404	NP_647455
Location (UCSC)	Chr 7: 140.72 – 140.92 Mb	Chr 6: 39.58 – 39.7 Mb
PubMed search
- Wikidata
View/Edit Human	View/Edit Mouse

BRAF is a human gene that encodes a protein called B-Raf. The gene is also referred to as proto-oncogene B-Raf and v-Raf murine sarcoma viral oncogene homolog B, while the protein is more formally known as serine/threonine-protein kinase B-Raf.

The B-Raf protein is involved in sending signals inside cells which are involved in directing cell growth. In 2002, it was shown to be mutated in some human cancers.

Certain other inherited BRAF mutations cause birth defects.

Drugs that treat cancers driven by BRAF mutations have been developed. Two of these drugs, vemurafenib and dabrafenib, are approved by FDA for treatment of late-stage melanoma. Vemurafenib was the first approved drug to come out of fragment-based drug discovery.

== Function ==
Overview of signal transduction pathways involved in apoptosis. The role of Raf proteins like B-Raf is indicated in the center.

B-Raf is a member of the Raf kinase family of growth signal transduction protein kinases. This protein plays a role in regulating the MAP kinase/ERKs signaling pathway, which affects cell division, differentiation, and secretion.

== Structure ==
B-Raf is a 766-amino acid, regulated signal transduction serine/threonine-specific protein kinase. Broadly speaking, it is composed of three conserved domains characteristic of the Raf kinase family: conserved region 1 (CR1), a Ras-GTP-binding self-regulatory domain, conserved region 2 (CR2), a serine-rich hinge region, and conserved region 3 (CR3), a catalytic protein kinase domain that phosphorylates a consensus sequence on protein substrates. In its active conformation, B-Raf forms dimers via hydrogen-bonding and electrostatic interactions of its kinase domains.

=== CR1 ===
Conserved region 1 (CR1) autoinhibits B-Raf's kinase domain (CR3) so that B-Raf signaling is regulated rather than constitutive. Residues 155–227 make up the Ras-binding domain (RBD), which binds to Ras-GTP's effector domain to release CR1 and halt kinase inhibition. Residues 234–280 comprise a phorbol ester/DAG-binding zinc finger motif that participates in B-Raf membrane docking after Ras-binding.

=== CR2 ===
Conserved region 2 (CR2) provides a flexible linker that connects CR1 and CR3 and acts as a hinge.

=== CR3 ===
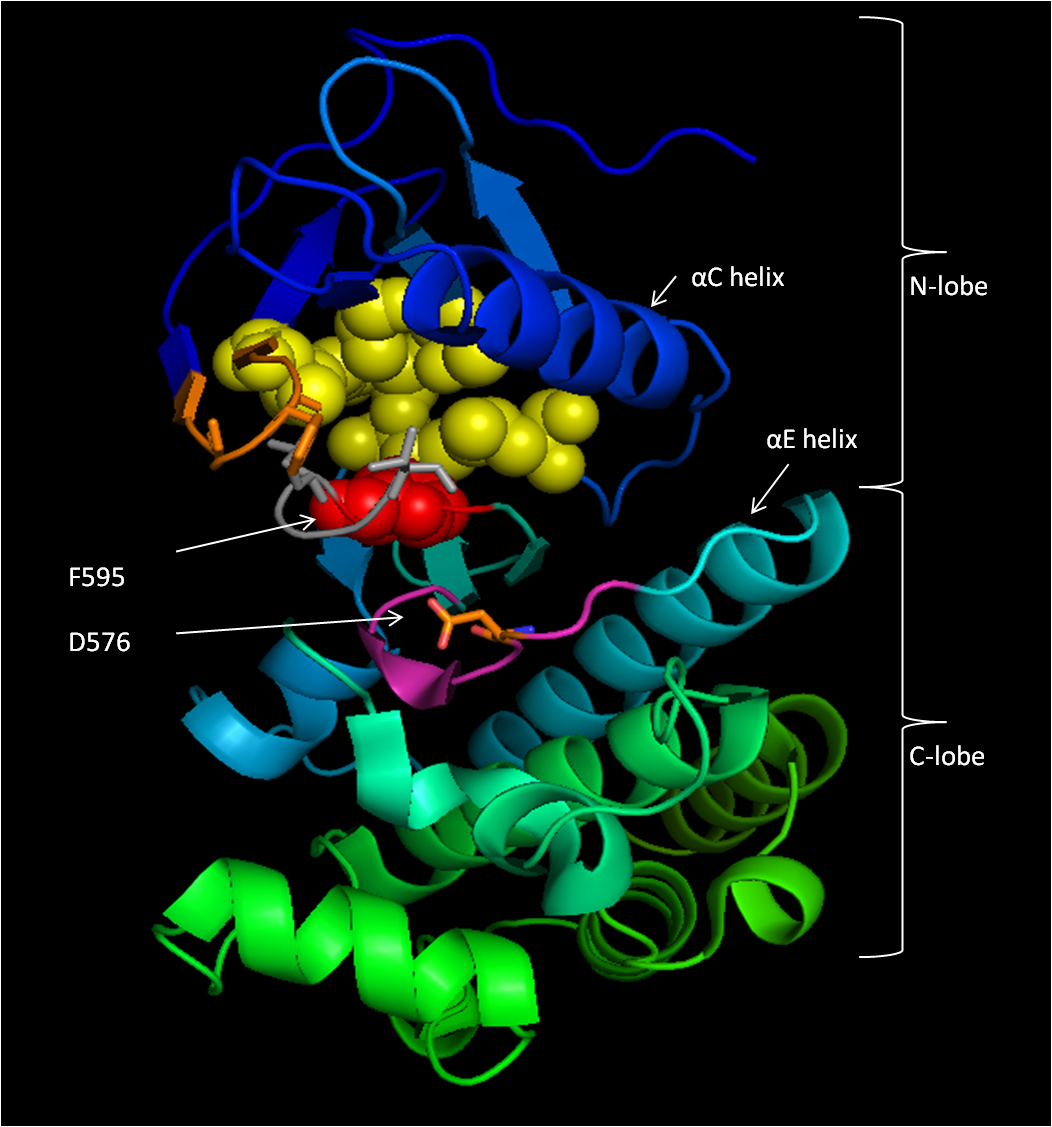
Figure 1: Inactive conformation of B-Raf kinase (CR3) domain. P-Loop (orange) hydrophobic interactions with activation loop (gray) residues that stabilize the inactive kinase conformation are shown with sticks. F595 (red) blocks the hydrophobic pocket where the ATP adenine binds (yellow). D576 (orange) is shown as part of the catalytic loop (magenta). Figure modified from PDB id 1UWH.

Conserved region 3 (CR3), residues 457–717, makes up B-Raf's enzymatic kinase domain. This largely conserved structure is bi-lobal, connected by a short hinge region. The smaller N-lobe (residues 457–530) is primarily responsible for ATP binding while the larger C-lobe (residues 535–717) binds substrate proteins. The active site is the cleft between the two lobes, and the catalytic Asp576 residue is located on the C-lobe, facing the inside of this cleft.

==== Subregions ====
===== P-Loop =====
The P-loop of B-Raf (residues 464–471) stabilizes the non-transferable phosphate groups of ATP during enzyme ATP-binding. Specifically, S467, F468, and G469 backbone amides hydrogen-bond to the β-phosphate of ATP to anchor the molecule. B-Raf functional motifs have been determined by analyzing the homology of PKA analyzed by Hanks and Hunter to the B-Raf kinase domain.

===== Nucleotide-binding pocket =====
V471, C532, W531, T529, L514, and A481 form a hydrophobic pocket within which the adenine of ATP is anchored through Van der Waals attractions upon ATP binding.

===== Catalytic loop =====
Residues 574–581 compose a section of the kinase domain responsible for supporting the transfer of the γ-phosphate of ATP to B-Raf's protein substrate. In particular, D576 acts as a proton acceptor to activate the nucleophilic hydroxyl oxygen on substrate serine or threonine residues, allowing the phosphate transfer reaction to occur mediated by base-catalysis.

===== DFG motif =====
D594, F595, and G596 compose a motif central to B-Raf's function in both its inactive and active state. In the inactive state, F595 occupies the nucleotide-binding pocket, prohibiting ATP from entering and decreasing the likelihood of enzyme catalysis. In the active state, D594 chelates the divalent magnesium cation that stabilizes the β- and γ-phosphate groups of ATP, orienting the γ-phosphate for transfer.

===== Activation loop =====
Residues 596–600 form strong hydrophobic interactions with the P-loop in the inactive conformation of the kinase, locking the kinase in its inactive state until the activation loop is phosphorylated, destabilizing these interactions with the presence of negative charge. This triggers the shift to the active state of the kinase. Specifically, L597 and V600 of the activation loop interact with G466, F468, and V471 of the P-loop to keep the kinase domain inactive until it is phosphorylated.

== Enzymology ==
B-Raf is a serine/threonine-specific protein kinase. As such, it catalyzes the phosphorylation of serine and threonine residues in a consensus sequence on target proteins by ATP, yielding ADP and a phosphorylated protein as products. Since it is a highly regulated signal transduction kinase, B-Raf must first bind Ras-GTP before becoming active as an enzyme. Once B-Raf is activated, a conserved protein kinase catalytic core phosphorylates protein substrates by promoting the nucleophilic attack of the activated substrate serine or threonine hydroxyl oxygen atom on the γ-phosphate group of ATP through bimolecular nucleophilic substitution.

=== Activation ===
==== Relieving CR1 autoinhibition ====
The kinase (CR3) domain of human Raf kinases is inhibited by two mechanisms: autoinhibition by its own regulatory Ras-GTP-binding CR1 domain and a lack of post-translational phosphorylation of key serine and tyrosine residues (S338 and Y341 for c-Raf) in the CR2 hinge region. During B-Raf activation, the protein's autoinhibitory CR1 domain first binds Ras-GTP's effector domain to the CR1 Ras-binding domain (RBD) to release the kinase CR3 domain like other members of the human Raf kinase family. The CR1-Ras interaction is later strengthened through the binding of the cysteine-rich subdomain (CRD) of CR1 to Ras and membrane phospholipids. Unlike A-Raf and C-Raf, which must be phosphorylated on hydroxyl-containing CR2 residues before fully releasing CR1 to become active, B-Raf is constituitively phosphorylated on CR2 S445. This allows the negatively charged phosphoserine to immediately repel CR1 through steric and electrostatic interactions once the regulatory domain is unbound, freeing the CR3 kinase domain to interact with substrate proteins.

==== CR3 domain activation ====
After the autoinhibitory CR1 regulatory domain is released, B-Raf's CR3 kinase domain must change to its ATP-binding active conformer before it can catalyze protein phosphorylation. In the inactive conformation, F595 of the DFG motif blocks the hydrophobic adenine binding pocket while activation loop residues form hydrophobic interactions with the P-loop, stopping ATP from accessing its binding site. When the activation loop is phosphorylated, the negative charge of the phosphate is unstable in the hydrophobic environment of the P-loop. As a result, the activation loop changes conformation, stretching out across the C-lobe of the kinase domain. In this process, it forms stabilizing β-sheet interactions with the β6 strand. Meanwhile, the phosphorylated residue approaches K507, forming a stabilizing salt bridge to lock the activation loop into place. The DFG motif changes conformation with the activation loop, causing F595 to move out of the adenine nucleotide binding site and into a hydrophobic pocket bordered by the αC and αE helices. Together, DFG and activation loop movement upon phosphorylation open the ATP binding site. Since all other substrate-binding and catalytic domains are already in place, phosphorylation of the activation loop alone activates B-Raf's kinase domain through a chain reaction that essentially removes a lid from an otherwise-prepared active site.

=== Mechanism of catalysis ===
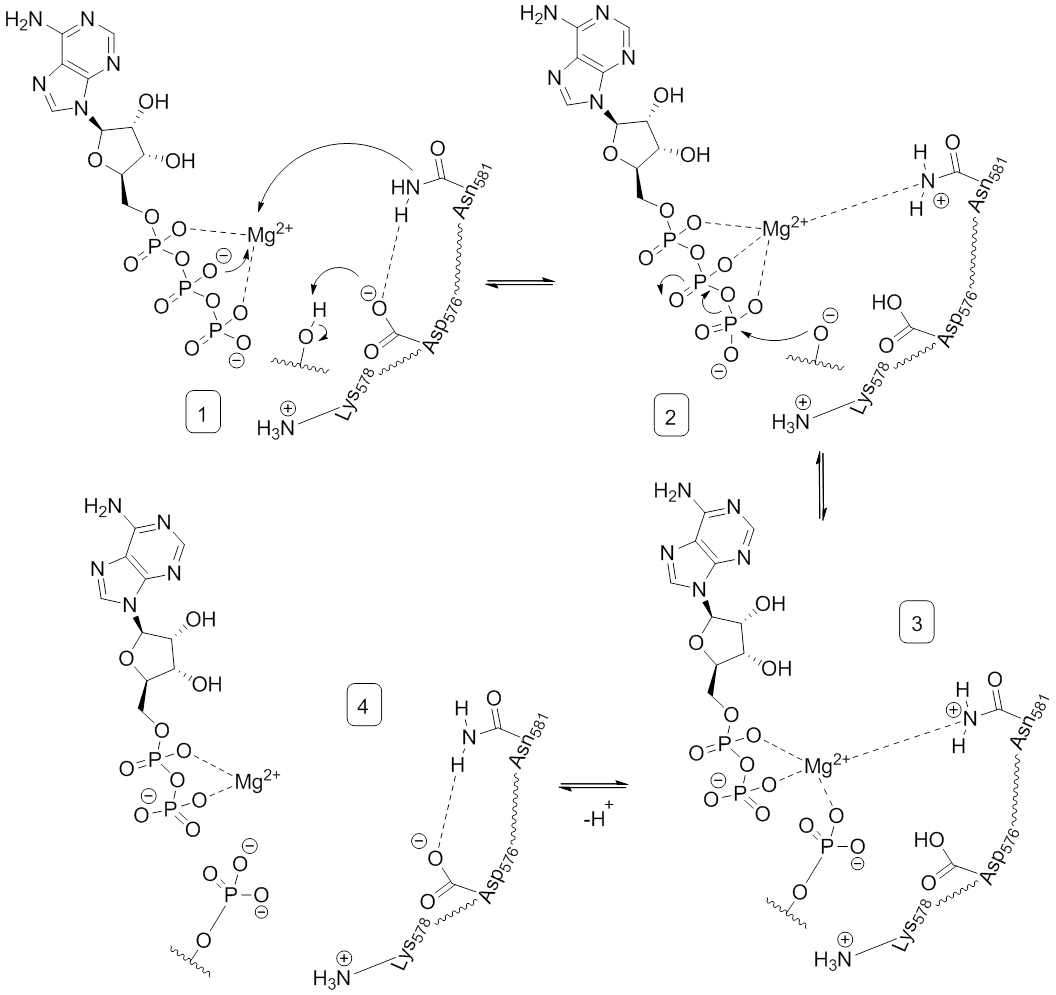
Figure 2: Base-catalyzed nucleophilic attack of a serine/threonine substrate residue on the γ-phosphate group of ATP. Step 1: chelation of secondary magnesium ion by N581 and deprotonation of substrate Ser/Thr by D576. Step 2: nucleophilic attack of activated substrate hydroxyl on ATP γ-phosphate. Step 3: magnesium complex breaks down and D576 deprotonates. Step 4: release of products.

To effectively catalyze protein phosphorylation via the bimolecular substitution of serine and threonine residues with ADP as a leaving group, B-Raf must first bind ATP and then stabilize the transition state as the γ-phosphate of ATP is transferred.

==== ATP binding ====
B-Raf binds ATP by anchoring the adenine nucleotide in a nonpolar pocket (yellow, Figure 1) and orienting the molecule through hydrogen-bonding and electrostatic interactions with phosphate groups. In addition to the P-loop and DFG motif phosphate binding described above, K483 and E501 play key roles in stabilizing non-transferable phosphate groups. The positive charge on the primary amine of K483 allows it to stabilize the negative charge on ATP α- and β-phosphate groups when ATP binds. When ATP is not present, the negative charge of the E501 carboxyl group balances this charge.

==== Phosphorylation ====
Once ATP is bound to the B-Raf kinase domain, D576 of the catalytic loop activates a substrate hydroxyl group, increasing its nucleophilicity to kinetically drive the phosphorylation reaction while other catalytic loop residues stabilize the transition state (Figure 2). N581 chelates the divalent magnesium cation associated with ATP to help orient the molecule for optimal substitution. K578 neutralizes the negative charge on the γ-phosphate group of ATP so that the activated ser/thr substrate residue will not experience as much electron-electron repulsion when attacking the phosphate. After the phosphate group is transferred, ADP and the new phosphoprotein are released.

=== Inhibitors ===
Since constitutively active B-Raf mutants commonly cause cancer (see Clinical Significance) by excessively signaling cells to grow, inhibitors of B-Raf have been developed for both the inactive and active conformations of the kinase domain as cancer therapeutic candidates.

==== Sorafenib ====
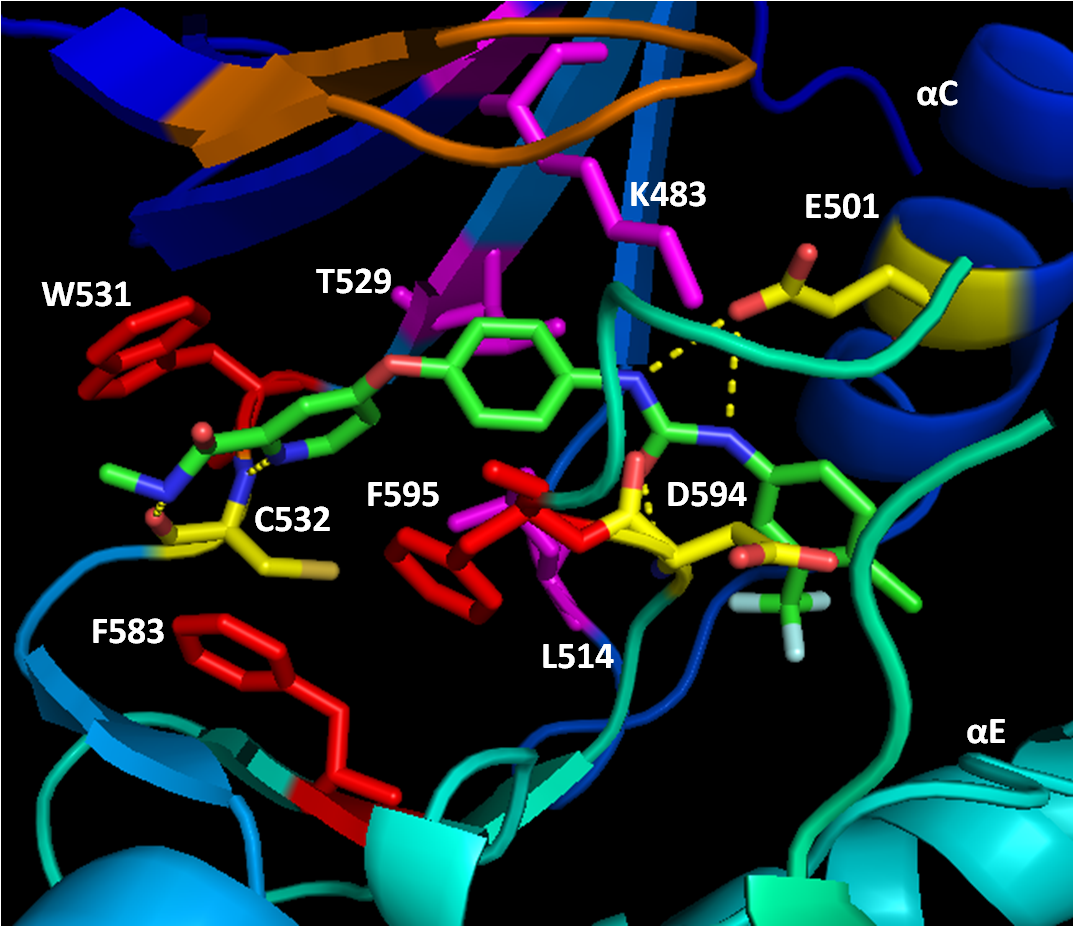
Figure 3: B-Raf kinase domain locked in the inactive conformation by bound BAY43-9006. Hydrophobic interactions anchor BAY43-9006 in the ATP binding site while urea group hydrogen-bonding traps D594 of the DFG motif. The BAY43-9006 trifluoromethyl phenyl ring further prohibits DFG motif and activation loop movement to the active confermer via steric blockage.

BAY43-9006 (Sorafenib, Nexavar) is a V600E mutant B-Raf and C-Raf inhibitor approved by the FDA for the treatment of primary liver and kidney cancer. Bay43-9006 disables the B-Raf kinase domain by locking the enzyme in its inactive form. The inhibitor accomplishes this by blocking the ATP binding pocket through high-affinity for the kinase domain. It then binds key activation loop and DFG motif residues to stop the movement of the activation loop and DFG motif to the active conformation. Finally, a trifluoromethyl phenyl moiety sterically blocks the DFG motif and activation loop active conformation site, making it impossible for the kinase domain to shift conformation to become active.

The distal pyridyl ring of BAY43-9006 anchors in the hydrophobic nucleotide-binding pocket of the kinase N-lobe, interacting with W531, F583, and F595. The hydrophobic interactions with catalytic loop F583 and DFG motif F595 stabilize the inactive conformation of these structures, decreasing the likelihood of enzyme activation. Further hydrophobic interaction of K483, L514, and T529 with the center phenyl ring increase the affinity of the kinase domain for the inhibitor. Hydrophobic interaction of F595 with the center ring as well decreases the energetic favorability of a DFG conformation switch further. Finally, polar interactions of BAY43-9006 with the kinase domain continue this trend of increasing enzyme affinity for the inhibitor and stabilizing DFG residues in the inactive conformation. E501 and C532 hydrogen bond the urea and pyridyl groups of the inhibitor respectively while the urea carbonyl accepts a hydrogen bond from D594's backbone amide nitrogen to lock the DFG motif in place.

The trifluoromethyl phenyl moiety cements the thermodynamic favorability of the inactive conformation when the kinase domain is bound to BAY43-9006 by sterically blocking the hydrophobic pocket between the αC and αE helices that the DFG motif and activation loop would inhabit upon shifting to their locations in the active conformation of the protein.

==== Vemurafenib ====
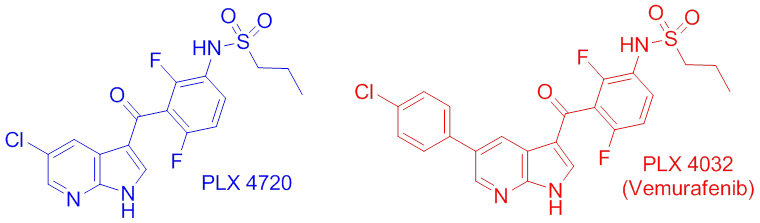
Figure 4: Structures of Vemurafenib (right) and its precursor, PLX 4720 (left), two inhibitors of the active conformation of the B-Raf kinase domain

PLX4032 (Vemurafenib) is a V600 mutant B-Raf inhibitor approved by the FDA for the treatment of late-stage melanoma. Unlike BAY43-9006, which inhibits the inactive form of the kinase domain, Vemurafenib inhibits the active "DFG-in" form of the kinase, firmly anchoring itself in the ATP-binding site. By inhibiting only the active form of the kinase, Vemurafenib selectively inhibits the proliferation of cells with unregulated B-Raf, normally those that cause cancer.

Since Vemurafenib only differs from its precursor, PLX4720, in a phenyl ring added for pharmacokinetic reasons, PLX4720's mode of action is equivalent to Vemurafenib's. PLX4720 has good affinity for the ATP binding site partially because its anchor region, a 7-azaindole bicyclic, only differs from the natural adenine that occupies the site in two places where nitrogen atoms have been replaced by carbon. This enables strong intermolecular interactions like N7 hydrogen bonding to C532 and N1 hydrogen bonding to Q530 to be preserved. Excellent fit within the ATP-binding hydrophobic pocket (C532, W531, T529, L514, A481) increases binding affinity as well. Ketone linker hydrogen bonding to water and difluoro-phenyl fit in a second hydrophobic pocket (A481, V482, K483, V471, I527, T529, L514, and F583) contribute to the exceptionally high binding affinity overall. Selective binding to active Raf is accomplished by the terminal propyl group that binds to a Raf-selective pocket created by a shift of the αC helix. Selectivity for the active conformation of the kinase is further increased by a pH-sensitive deprotonated sulfonamide group that is stabilized by hydrogen bonding with the backbone peptide NH of D594 in the active state. In the inactive state, the inhibitor's sulfonamide group interacts with the backbone carbonyl of that residue instead, creating repulsion. Thus, Vemurafenib binds preferentially to the active state of B-Raf's kinase domain.

== Clinical significance ==
Mutations in the BRAF gene can cause disease in two ways. First, mutations can be inherited and cause birth defects. Second, mutations can appear later in life and cause cancer, as an oncogene.

Inherited mutations in this gene cause cardiofaciocutaneous syndrome, a disease characterized by heart defects, intellectual disability and a distinctive facial appearance.

Mutations in this gene have been found in cancers, including non-Hodgkin lymphoma, colorectal cancer, melanoma, papillary thyroid carcinoma, non-small-cell lung carcinoma, adenocarcinoma of the lung, neuroendocrine carcinoma, brain tumors including glioblastoma, and pleomorphic xanthoastrocytoma as well as inflammatory diseases like Erdheim–Chester disease.

The V600E mutation of the BRAF gene has been associated with hairy cell leukemia in numerous studies and has been suggested for use in screening for Lynch syndrome to reduce the number of patients undergoing unnecessary MLH1 sequencing.

=== Mutants ===
More than 30 mutations of the BRAF gene associated with human cancers have been identified. The frequency of BRAF mutations varies widely in human cancers, from more than 80% in melanomas and nevi, to as little as 0–18% in other tumors, such as 1–3% in lung cancers and 5% in colorectal cancer. In 90% of the cases, thymine is substituted with adenine at nucleotide 1799. This leads to valine (V) being substituted for by glutamate (E) at codon 600 (now referred to as V600E) in the activation segment that has been found in human cancers. This mutation has been widely observed in papillary thyroid carcinoma, colorectal cancer, melanoma and non-small-cell lung cancer. BRAF-V600E mutation are present in 57% of Langerhans cell histiocytosis patients. The V600E mutation is a likely driver mutation in 100% of cases of hairy cell leukaemia. High frequency of BRAF V600E mutations have been detected in ameloblastoma, a benign but locally infiltrative odontogenic neoplasm. The V600E mutation may also be linked, as a single-driver mutation (a genetic 'smoking gun') to certain cases of papillary craniopharyngioma development.

Other mutations which have been found are R461I, I462S, G463E, G463V, G465A, G465E, G465V, G468A, G468E, G469R, N580S, E585K, D593V, F594L, G595R, L596V, T598I, V599D, V599E, V599K, V599R, V600K, A727V, etc. and most of these mutations are clustered to two regions: the glycine-rich P loop of the N lobe and the activation segment and flanking regions. These mutations change the activation segment from inactive state to active state, for example in the previous cited paper it has been reported that the aliphatic side chain of Val599 interacts with the phenyl ring of Phe467 in the P loop. Replacing the medium-sized hydrophobic Val side chain with a larger and charged residue as found in human cancer(Glu, Asp, Lys, or Arg) would be expected to destabilize the interactions that maintain the DFG motif in an inactive conformation, so flipping the activation segment into the active position. Depending on the type of mutation the kinase activity towards MEK may also vary. Most of the mutants stimulate enhanced B-Raf kinase activity toward MEK. However, a few mutants act through a different mechanism because although their activity toward MEK is reduced, they adopt a conformation that activates wild-type C-RAF, which then signals to ERK.

==== BRAF-V600E ====
- BRAF V600E is a determinant of sensitivity to proteasome inhibitors. Vulnerability to proteasome inhibitors is dependent on persistent BRAF signaling, because BRAF-V600E blockade by PLX4720 reversed sensitivity to carfilzomib in BRAF-mutant colorectal cancer cells. Proteasome inhibition might represent a valuable targeting strategy in BRAF V600E-mutant colorectal tumors.

=== BRAF inhibitors ===
As mentioned above, some pharmaceutical firms are developing specific inhibitors of mutated B-raf protein for anticancer use because BRAF is a well-understood, high yield target. Vemurafenib (RG7204 or PLX4032) was licensed by the US Food and Drug Administration (FDA) as Zelboraf for the treatment of metastatic melanoma in August 2011 based on Phase III clinical data. Improved survival was seen, as well as a response rate to treatment of 53%, compared to 7–12% with the former best chemotherapeutic treatment, dacarbazine. Dabrafenib in combination with trametinib was approved by FDA in June 2022 for treatment of all metastatic BRAF V600E mutated solid tumors. In clinical trials, B-Raf increased metastatic melanoma patient chance of survival. In spite of the drug's high efficacy, 20% of tumors still develop resistance to the treatment. In mice, 20% of tumors become resistant after 56 days. While the mechanisms of this resistance are still disputed, some hypotheses include the overexpression of B-Raf to compensate for high concentrations of Vemurafenib and upstream upregulation of growth signaling.

More general B-Raf inhibitors include GDC-0879, PLX-4720, Sorafenib, dabrafenib and encorafenib.

==== panRAF inhibitors ====
Belvarafenib is classified as a panRAF inhibitor. A panRAF inhibitor blocks the catalytic function of both proteins in the dimer.

== Interactions ==
BRAF (gene) has been shown to interact with:

- AKT1,
- C-Raf,
- HRAS, and
- YWHAB.
