= Neurosphere =

Neural stem cell culture system

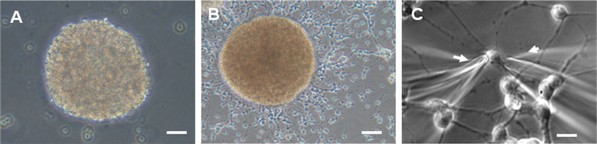
Neural progenitor cells: After forming a neurosphere, embryonic neural progenitor cells spread out into a monolayer. A. Neurosphere consisting of SVZ cells isolated at E15 that have aggregated in suspension after 2 days in culture. Scale bar: 100 μm. B. Neurosphere of SVZ cells derived at E15 that has attached to the floor of the culture flask after 4 days in culture. Note cells migrate away from the neurosphere. Scale bar: 100 μm. C. Cells at the periphery of neurospheres were chosen for electrophysiological recording. Most of the recorded cells extended processes. Arrows indicate the location of recording (left) and puffer (right) pipettes. Scale bar: 20 μm. Smith DO et al., PLoS ONE, 2008

A neurosphere is a culture system composed of free-floating clusters of neural stem cells. Neurospheres provide a method to investigate neural precursor cells in vitro. Putative neural stem cells are suspended in a medium lacking adherent substrates but containing necessary growth factors, such as epidermal growth factor and fibroblast growth factor. This allows the neural stem cells to form into characteristic 3-D clusters. However, neurospheres are not identical to stem cells; rather, they only contain a small percentage of neural stem cells.

The predominant use of the neurosphere is in the neurosphere assay. However, in vitro and in vivo environments have shown to have different inductive effects on precursor cells. The creation of the neurosphere assay is highly sensitive; it is still unclear as to the exact differing effects that environment produces, relative to the in vivo environment.

== History ==
Reynolds and Weiss first described the neurosphere method of investigating neural precursor cells in 1992. The method was continued through the work of Angelo Viscovi and Derek van der Kooy and colleagues.

=== Reynolds and Weiss ===
In 1992, Brent A. Reynolds and Samuel Weiss attempted to isolate EGF-responsive cells from an adult mouse central nervous system (CNS). They dissociated the striata of 3 to 18-month-old mice via enzymes and plated them in a serum-free culture containing 20 ng of EGF per milliliter. After two days in vitro, most of the cells had died, but 15±2 cells for each plate were undergoing cell division. This continued for two to three days, after which the proliferating clusters of cells detached and formed a sphere of proliferating cells. After this discovery of a spherical formation of cells, the two assessed the antigenic properties of the cells within these spheres. They found that cells in the spheres were nearly all immunoreactive for nestin, an intermediate filament found in neuroepithelial stem cells. The cells were not immunoreactive for neurofilament, neuron-specific enolase (NSE), and glial fibrillary acidic protein (GFAP). After more proliferation and longer days in vitro in the presence of EGF, cells eventually became immunoreactive to neurofilament, NSE, and GFAP. The cells that had this immunoreactivity were then tested for CNS neurotransmitters with indirect immunocytochemistry. Reynolds and Weiss found that, at 21 days, in vitro cultures of spheres and associated cells contained two of the major neurotransmitters of the adult striatum. These spheres of cells that Reynolds and Weiss discovered in 1992 were the first neurosphere formations created and analyzed.

== Neurosphere (Stemness) Assay ==
The neurosphere assay examines three fundamental characteristics of neural stem cells: proliferation, self-renewal, and multipotency. Self-renewal and multipotency are the requirements for cells to be considered stem cells. The neurosphere assay, or stemness assay, has been used to confirm that neurospheres contain neural stem cells. Neurospheres are dissociated and distributed into single-cell wells to examine self-renewal through clonal analysis. A small percentage of cells reform into a secondary neurosphere. The secondary neurospheres are then transferred into a culture medium containing growth factors that promote cell differentiation. The presence of varying cell types, including neurons, astrocytes, and oligodendrocytes, confirms the multipotency of these precursor cells. The evidence of self-renewal and multipotency serves to confirm the presence of neural stem cells within neurospheres, and emphasizes that neural stem cells comprise only a fraction of the neurosphere.

== Clinical Applications ==
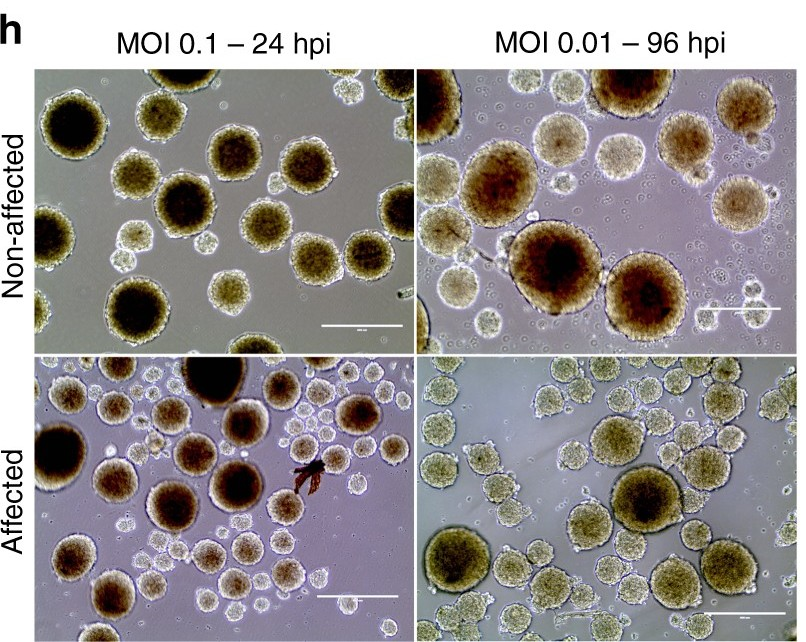
Neurospheres have been used to study viral susceptibility to zika virus infection.

Since the neurosphere assay's goal is to develop neural stem cells in vitro, the clinical applications of such an achievement can be highly beneficial. Neural stem cells that are transplanted are able to cross the blood–brain barrier and integrate themselves into the host's brain without disrupting normal function. This therapeutic application of neural stem cells derived from neurospheres is still in its infancy concerning efficacy, but it has a high potential for success in treating many diseases.

Another aspect of clinical applications regarding neural stem cells is versatility. There have been neural stem cell transplants into various tissues with successful differentiation and proliferation in these tissues. This broader differentiation "spectrum" would be highly exploitable in a clinical setting.

Neurospheres have also been used for peripheral nerve regeneration

=== Auditory Restoration ===
Researchers are exploring the use of neural stem cells (NSCs) obtained from neurospheres to aid in the regrowth of inner ear neurons and hair cells. Hu et al. transplanted adult mice NSCs into normal and deafened inner ears of guinea pigs. Before implantation, the NSCs were treated with neurogenin 2 protein to encourage the proliferation of the intended inner ear cells. They concluded that adult NSCs were indeed able to survive and differentiate in the injured inner ear and that this type of therapy could act to restore auditory function in hearing-impaired subjects. This experiment also indicates that genetic engineering can contribute to the success of generating specific progenitor cells of interest.

== Limitations ==
However useful the neurosphere culture has been for biological studies of developmental processes and the functional assay for testing neuronal characteristics, there are several limitations to the method.

First, the neurosphere culture formation is highly sensitive to the procedure, as the creation is contingent on the system used to create the culture. Variations in cell density, different constituents or concentrations of factors in the media and method, method and frequency of passaging, and whether the neurosphere is dissociated before differentiation can lead to differences in both the composition of cell types and properties within each neurosphere. This poses a problem for consolidating and interpreting data, even within the same study.

Another problem with the system arises from the nature of suspension cultures (in vitro) : individual cells cannot easily be carefully monitored. Since the neuronic capacity of the neurosphere-expanded cells diminishes after an extended number of passages, the lack of monitoring adds further complexity to the neurosphere method.

Finally, only a small percentage of cells within each heterogeneous sphere have the potential to form neurospheres, and even fewer cells actually fulfill the criteria for being neural stem cells. Neurospheres each contain cells at multiple stages of differentiation, including stem cells, proliferating neural progenitor cells, postmitotic neurons, and glia. Moreover, the heterogeneity of the neurosphere increases with its size, since more and more varied cell types arise with a longer time in culture.

== See also ==
- Cerebral organoid
- Neural stem cell
- Progenitor cell
- Adult stem cell
