= Ras superfamily =

Protein superfamily of small GTPases

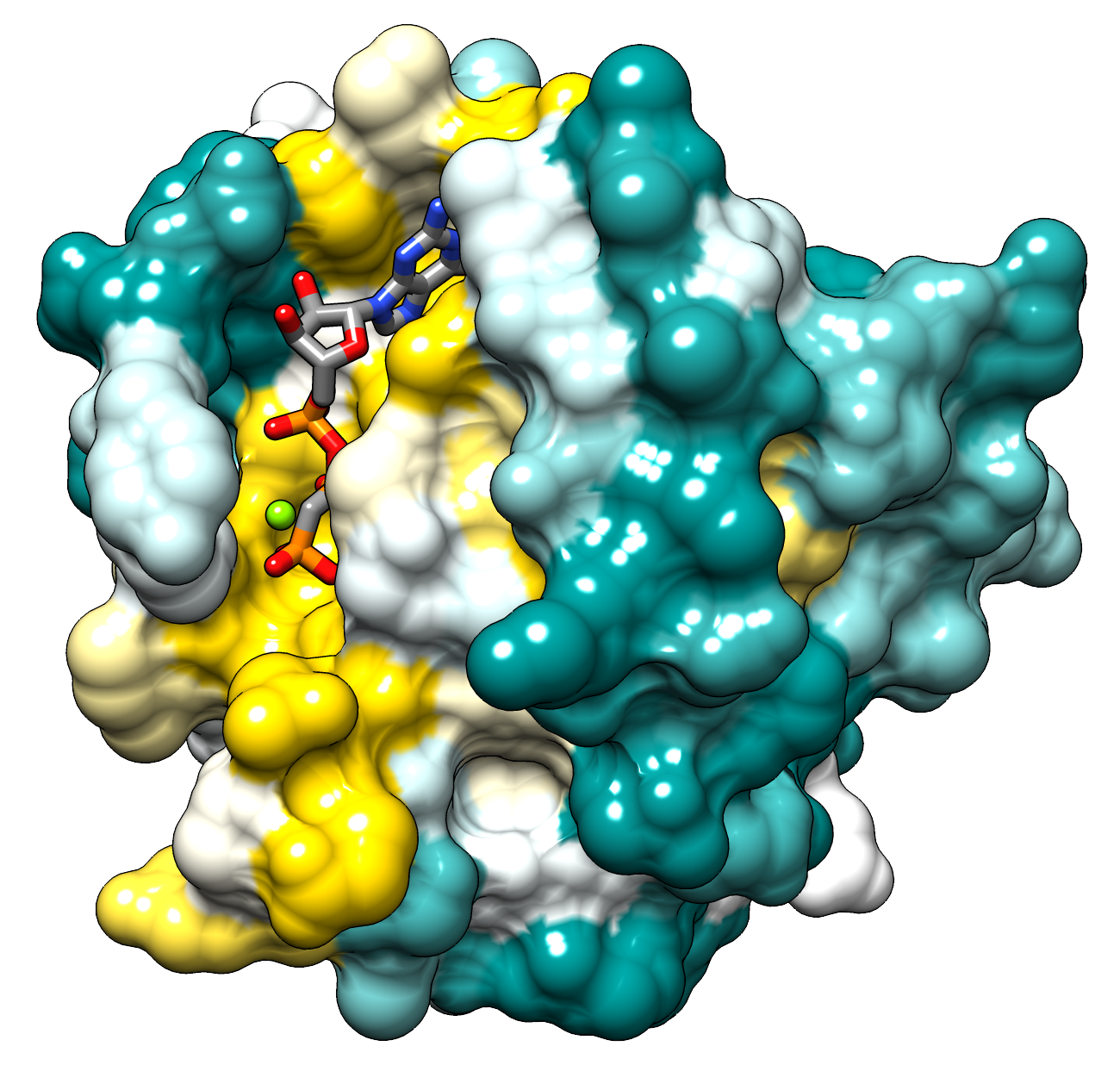
- H-Ras structure PDB 121p, surface colored by conservation in Pfam seed alignment: gold, most conserved; dark cyan, least conserved.

Identifiers
- Symbol: Ras
- Pfam: PF00071
- InterPro: IPR013753
- PROSITE: PDOC00017
- SCOP2: 5p21 / SCOPe / SUPFAM
- CDD: cd00882
- Membranome: 206
Available protein structures:
- PDB: IPR013753 PF00071 (ECOD; PDBsum)
- AlphaFold: IPR013753; PF00071

The Ras superfamily, derived from "Rat sarcoma virus", is a protein superfamily of small GTPases. Members of the superfamily are divided into families and subfamilies based on their structure, sequence and function. The five main families are Ras, Rho, Ran, Rab and Arf GTPases. The Ras family itself is further divided into 6 subfamilies: Ras, Ral, Rap, Rheb, Rad and Rit. Miro is a recent contributor to the superfamily. Each subfamily shares the common core G domain, which provides essential GTPase and nucleotide exchange activity.

The surrounding sequence helps determine the functional specificity of the small GTPase, for example the 'Insert Loop', common to the Rho subfamily, specifically contributes to binding to effector proteins such as WASP.

In general, the Ras family is responsible for cell proliferation: Rho for cell morphology, Ran for nuclear transport, and Rab and Arf for vesicle transport.

== Subfamilies and members ==
The following is a list of human proteins belonging to the Ras superfamily:

Overview
| Subfamily | Function | Members |
|---|---|---|
| Ras | cell proliferation | DIRAS1; DIRAS2; DIRAS3; ERAS; GEM; HRAS; KRAS; MRAS; NKIRAS1; NKIRAS2; NRAS; RALA; RALB; RAP1A; RAP1B; RAP2A; RAP2B; RAP2C; RASD1; RASD2; RASL10A; RASL10B; RASL11A; RASL11B; RASL12; REM1; REM2; RERG; RERGL; RRAD; RRAS; RRAS2 |
| Rho | cytoskeletal dynamics/morphology | RHOA; RHOB; RHOBTB1; RHOBTB2; RHOBTB3; RHOC; RHOD; RHOF; RHOG; RHOH; RHOJ; RHOQ; RHOU; RHOV; RND1; RND2; RND3; RAC1; RAC2; RAC3; CDC42 |
| Rab | membrane trafficking | RAB1A; RAB1B; RAB2; RAB3A; RAB3B; RAB3C; RAB3D; RAB4A; RAB4B; RAB5A; RAB5B; RAB5C; RAB6A; RAB6B; RAB6C; RAB7A; RAB7B; RAB7L1; RAB8A; RAB8B; RAB9; RAB9B; RABL2A; RABL2B; RABL4; RAB10; RAB11A; RAB11B; RAB12; RAB13; RAB14; RAB15; RAB17; RAB18; RAB19; RAB20; RAB21; RAB22A; RAB23; RAB24; RAB25; RAB26; RAB27A; RAB27B; RAB28; RAB2B; RAB30; RAB31; RAB32; RAB33A; RAB33B; RAB34; RAB35; RAB36; RAB37; RAB38; RAB39; RAB39B; RAB40A; RAB40AL; RAB40B; RAB40C; RAB41; RAB42; RAB43 |
| Rap | cellular adhesion | RAP1A; RAP1B; RAP2A; RAP2B; RAP2C |
| Arf | vesicular transport | ARF1; ARF3; ARF4; ARF5; ARF6; ARL1; ARL2; ARL3; ARL4; ARL5; ARL5C; ARL6; ARL7; ARL8; ARL9; ARL10A; ARL10B; ARL10C; ARL11; ARL13A; ARL13B; ARL14; ARL15; ARL16; ARL17; TRIM23, ARL4D; ARFRP1; ARL13B |
| Ran | nuclear transport | RAN |
| Rheb | mTOR pathway | RHEB; RHEBL1 |
| RGK | | RRAD; GEM; REM; REM2 |
| Rit | | RIT1; RIT2 |
| Miro | mitochondrial transport | RHOT1; RHOT2 |

Unclassified:

- ARHGAP5
- DNAJC27
- GRLF1
- RASEF

== See also ==
- Ras subfamily
