= DIRAS1 =

Mammalian protein found in Homo sapiens

Identifiers
- Aliases: DIRAS1, Di-Ras1, GBTS1, RIG, DIRAS family GTPase 1
- External IDs: OMIM: 607862; MGI: 2183442; GeneCards: DIRAS1
Available structures
PDB	Ortholog search: PDBe RCSB
PDB	List of PDB id codes 2GF0

Gene location (Human)
Chr.	Chromosome 19 (human)
Band	19p13.3	Start	2,714,567 bp
Band	19p13.3	End	2,721,372 bp

Gene location (Mouse)
Chr.	Chromosome 10 (mouse)
Band	10|10 C1	Start	80,855,423 bp
Band	10|10 C1	End	80,861,496 bp
RNA expression pattern
Bgee	Human / Mouse (ortholog); Top expressed in: myocardium of left ventricle; apex of heart; right frontal lobe; prefrontal cortex; cardiac muscle tissue of right atrium; right auricle of heart; dorsolateral prefrontal cortex; Brodmann area 9; cingulate gyrus; anterior cingulate cortex / Top expressed in: neural layer of retina; visual cortex; primary visual cortex; superior frontal gyrus; dentate gyrus of hippocampal formation granule cell; cerebellar cortex; medial dorsal nucleus; medial geniculate nucleus; inferior colliculi; deep cerebellar nuclei; More reference expression data
BioGPS	n/a
Gene ontology
Molecular function	nucleotide binding; GTP binding; mitogen-activated protein kinase binding; GTPase activity; GDP binding
Cellular component	plasma membrane; membrane
Biological process	positive regulation of MAP kinase activity; signal transduction
Sources:Amigo / QuickGO
Orthologs
Databases	NCBI: entry; OMA: entry
Species	Human	Mouse
Entrez	148252	208666
Ensembl	ENSG00000176490	ENSMUSG00000043670
UniProt	O95057	Q91Z61
RefSeq (mRNA)	NM_145173	NM_145217
RefSeq (protein)	NP_660156	NP_660252
Location (UCSC)	Chr 19: 2.71 – 2.72 Mb	Chr 10: 80.86 – 80.86 Mb
PubMed search
- Wikidata
View/Edit Human	View/Edit Mouse

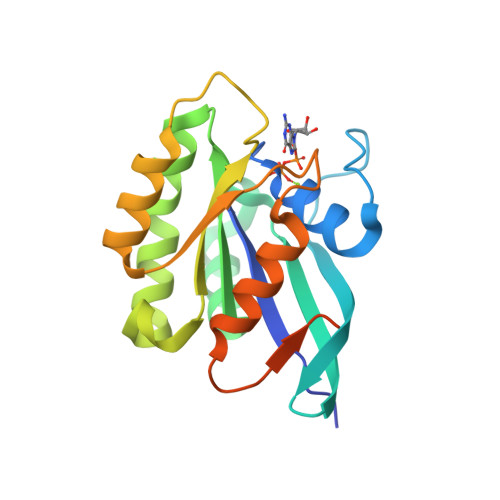
Crystal Structure of GDP-bound DIRAS1 protein

GTP-binding protein Di-Ras1 (DIRAS1) also known as Ras-related inhibitor of cell growth (RIG) is a protein that in humans is encoded by the DIRAS1 gene and is located on the chromosome band 10p13.3. This gene is a member of the Ras superfamily and is highly expressed in heart and brain tissue. DIRAS1 varies from other members of the Ras superfamily due to amino acid substitution in the RAF kinase and Ha-RAS, critical for GTP hydrolysis. Due to these substitution, DIRAS1 has a low level of GTPase activity and exists as the GTP-bound form leading to the hypothesis that DIRAS1 may regulate cell development in a different manner than other members of the Ras superfamily.

DIRAS1 is linked to human glioblastoma, colorectal cancer, renal cell carcinoma, and ovarian cancer. The DIRAS1 gene includes two exons with a 597 bp protein-coding region. The DIRAS1 protein is a GTPase belonging to the Ras superfamily and shares 40–50% homology with Ras and Rap. DIRAS1 differs from the more well-researched DIRAS3 in the length of its N-terminal extensions.

== Structure and function ==
While RIG is structurally similar to other GTPase proteins, its function is remarkably different from Ras. Ras is an oncogenic protein involved in cellular proliferation and signal transduction, and while the Ras superfamily generally consists of positive growth regulators, RIG is a tumor-suppressor gene. In contrast to Ras, RIG works as an inhibitor for cell growth, thus functioning as a negative growth regulator. RIG has also been shown to have less GTPase activity than most Ras proteins even though the proteins share a very similar structure.

The underlying cause for these dramatic differences in function is thought to be structural variations between RIG and the Ras superfamily. The negative growth regulation exhibited by RIG is most likely due to the unique length of its N-terminus extension. This sequence is not generally found in the Ras superfamily, most of which show no inhibitory activity towards cell growth and even act as positive growth regulators. The shorter 4 Amino Acid N-terminus of DIRAS1 and DIRAS 2 lacking the leucine-rich, hydrophobic domain may account for the variation in autophagy mechanisms between DIRAS1, DIRAS2 and DIRAS3.

== Role in cancer ==
DIRAS1 is believed to be a tumor suppressor in several human malignant tumors. DIRAS1, along with DIRAS2, is associated with overall and progression-free survival. Re-expression of the DIRAS1 gene induces and regulates autophagy by inhibiting the AKT1-MTOR and RAS-MAPK signaling pathway and modulating nuclear localization of the autophagy-related transcription factors FOXO3/FOXO3A and TFEB, suggesting that DIRAS1, along with DIRAS2, may behave as a surrogates in the murine genome for DIRAS3, and may function as a backup system for autophagy in humans. The DIRAS3 gene has been lost from the murine genome by telomeric chromosomal rearrangement.

In ovarian cancer cells, the re-expression of the DIRAS1 gene was found to inhibit cancer cell growth in vitro. Additionally, short-term cell viability was also significantly decreased as determined by sulforhodamine B colorimetric staining. While it was not found that DIRAS1 primarily inhibits cell growth through the mechanisms of apoptosis or cell cycle arrest, the autophagy pathway is essential for DIRAS1-induced growth inhibition.

The expression of DIRAS1 in Osteosarcoma cells was analyzed using the Western blot technique and was regulated by the METTL3 and METTL14 protein coding genes. While it is well known that the ERK and AKT signaling pathways are important in the tumorigenesis and metastasis of osteosarcoma, the DIRAS1 protein regulates the Akt/PKB signaling pathway in osteosarcoma cells. The ERK pathway is important for the development of cells, and the overactivation of the ERK pathway results in the development and progression of cancer.
