= CSTPP1 =

Protein-coding gene in the species Homo sapiens

Identifiers
- Aliases: CSTPP1, chromosome 11 open reading frame 49, C11orf49, centriolar satellite-associated tubulin polyglutamylase complex regulator 1
- External IDs: MGI: 1915079; GeneCards: CSTPP1

Gene location (Human)
Chr.	Chromosome 11 (human)
Band	11p11.2	Start	46,936,689 bp
Band	11p11.2	End	47,164,385 bp

Gene location (Mouse)
Chr.	Chromosome 2 (mouse)
Band	2|2 E1	Start	91,105,413 bp
Band	2|2 E1	End	91,275,049 bp
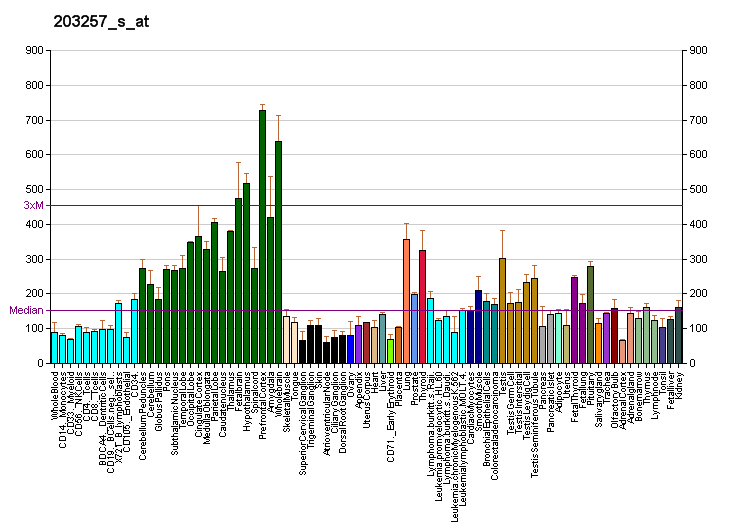
RNA expression pattern
Bgee	Human / Mouse (ortholog); Top expressed in: lateral nuclear group of thalamus; ventricular zone; external globus pallidus; pars compacta; right frontal lobe; pars reticulata; anterior cingulate cortex; Brodmann area 9; prefrontal cortex; right uterine tube / Top expressed in: neural layer of retina; dentate gyrus of hippocampal formation granule cell; spermatocyte; primary visual cortex; spermatid; superior frontal gyrus; ventricular zone; ventromedial nucleus; paraventricular nucleus of hypothalamus; arcuate nucleus; More reference expression data
BioGPS	More reference expression data
Orthologs
Databases	NCBI: entry; OMA: entry
Species	Human	Mouse
Entrez	79096	228356
Ensembl	ENSG00000149179	ENSMUSG00000040591
UniProt	Q9H6J7	Q8BHR8
RefSeq (mRNA)	NM_001003676; NM_001003677; NM_001003678; NM_001278222; NM_024113	NM_175123; NM_001311144; NM_153797
RefSeq (protein)	NP_001003676; NP_001003677; NP_001003678; NP_001265151; NP_077018	NP_001298073; NP_780332
Location (UCSC)	Chr 11: 46.94 – 47.16 Mb	Chr 2: 91.11 – 91.28 Mb
PubMed search
- Wikidata
View/Edit Human	View/Edit Mouse

Centriolar satellite-associated tubulin polyglutamylase complex regulator 1 is a protein that in humans is encoded by the gene CSTPP1 (previously C11orf49). Recent research suggests that it is involved in cytoskeleton organization indirectly by regulating the assembly and stability of a related protein complex called the tubulin polyglutamylase complex.

== Gene ==
=== Aliases ===
Common aliases are UPF0705, FLJ22210, and MGC4707.

=== Location ===
C11orf49 is found at locus p11.2 on human chromosome 11, with a plus strand orientation. The gene is 224,830 bp long including introns, and spans from position 46,936,806 to 47,161,635 on chromosome 11.

=== Transcript Variants ===
There are 7 known transcript variants for the mRNA of C11orf49, with variant 2 encoding for the most complete protein. Variant 1 lacks a 3’ splice junction, which results in a truncated 3’ terminus compared to variant 2. Variant 3 contains an alternate splice site at the 3’ end, which lacks an internal region near the 3’ terminus compared to variant 2. Variant 4 has an alternate 3’ terminus exon, resulting in a truncated 3’ terminus compared to variant 2. Variant 5 lacks an exon in the 5’ coding region which results in an upstream start codon, and has alternate splice site near the 3’ region. This results in a distinct N-terminus and a missing internal region near the 3’ terminus compared to variant 2. Variants 6 and 7 are both represented as candidates for nonsense-mediated mRNA decay (NMD), and do not encode for viable proteins.

Name	Accession Number	Numbers of Exons	Size (bp)
Transcript Variant 1	NM_001003676.3	8	1923
Transcript Variant 2	NM_001003677.3	9	1668
Transcript Variant 3	NM_024113.5	8	1650
Transcript Variant 4	NM_001003678.3	9	1159
Transcript Variant 5	NM_001278222.1	8	1619
Transcript Variant 6	NR_103471.2	10	1895
Transcript Variant 7	NR_103472.2	8	1519

Table 1. Known human mRNA transcript variants for C11orf49.

== Protein ==
Homo sapiens C11orf49 Conceptual Translation

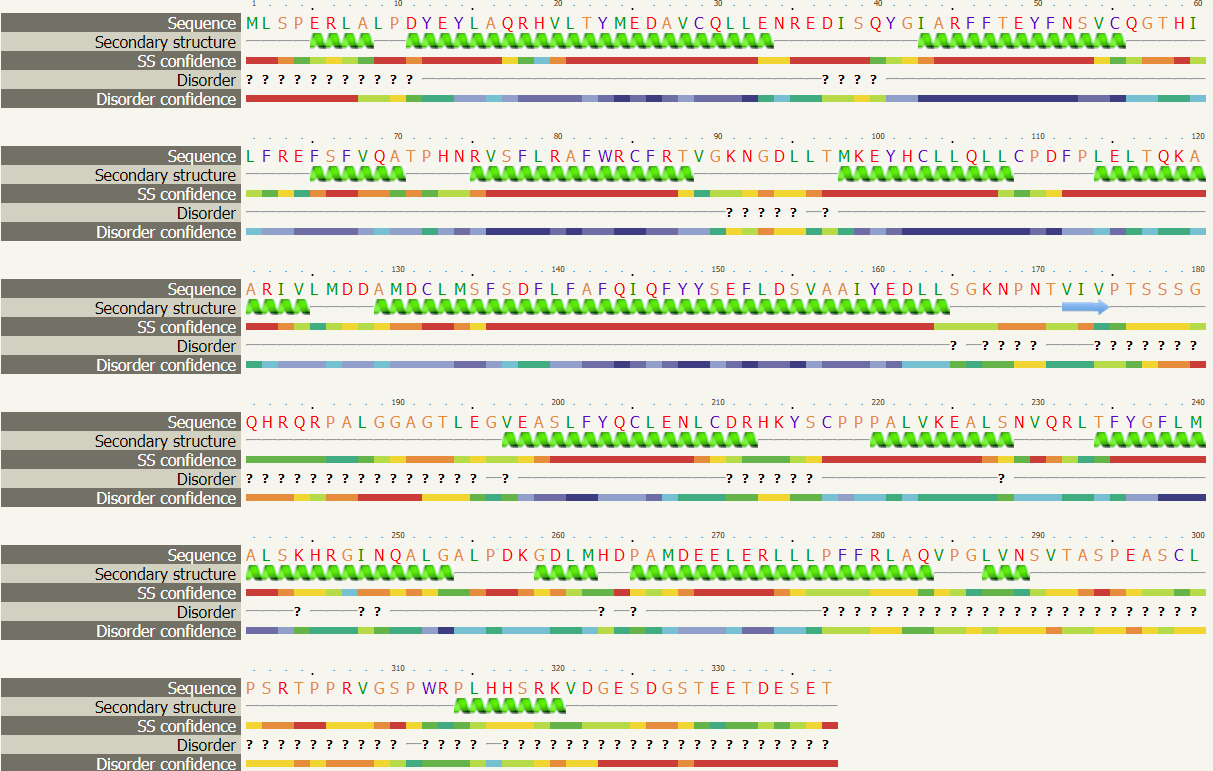
Predicted secondary structure from Phyre2

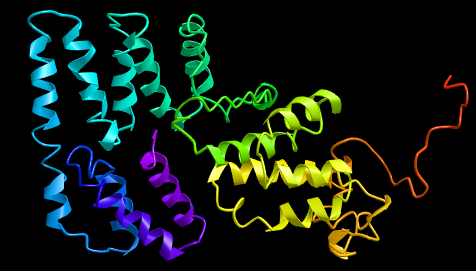
Predicted tertiary structure from i-Tasser (Ribbon style)

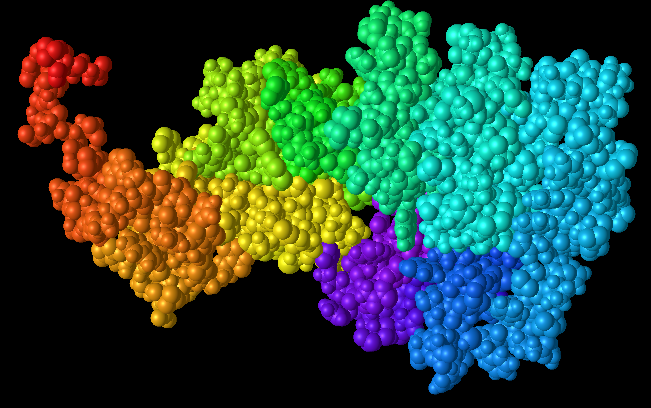
Predicted tertiary structure from i-Tasser (Sphere style)

=== Isoforms ===
There are 5 known isoforms for the C11orf49 protein with isoform 2 being the most complete protein, encoded by transcript variant 2.

Name	Accession Number	Size (AA)
Isoform 1	NP_001003676.1	274
Isoform 2	NP_001003677.1	337
Isoform 3	NP_077018.1	331
Isoform 4	NP_001003678.1	326
Isoform 5	NP_001265151.1	322

Table 2. Known human protein isoforms for C11orf49.

=== Composition ===
The C11orf49 protein has a molecular weight of 38.1 kD, and an isoelectric point of about pH = 5. Protein composition falls under normal levels for each amino acid, and there are no conserved repeats, patterns, or charged clusters to be seen. There are no hydrophobic or transmembrane regions to be seen.

=== Protein Domain ===
The C11orf49 protein is predicted to contain a protein kinase domain near the N' terminus (residues 12-51)

=== Secondary Structure ===
Secondary structure prediction tools such as Ali2D, Phyre2, and i-Tasser all predict that the C11orf49 protein is mostly composed of alpha helices, with no predicted beta sheets. Information on where these alpha helices are located can be seen to the right of the page.

=== Tertiary Structure ===
i-Tasser predicted tertiary structure is included to the right of the page.

=== Post-Translational Modifications ===
==== Phosphorylation ====
The C11orf49 protein is predicted to be phosphorylated at 4 different sites, mainly on serine residues, but also on one threonine residue.

Position	AA	Kinase
310	Serine	AGC/Akt
48	Threonine	AGC/Akt/AKT1
66	Serine	AGC/Akt
318	Serine	AGC/Akt

Table 3. Predicted phosphorylation sites for the C11orf49 human protein.

==== Sumoylation ====
The C11orf49 protein is predicted to be sumoylated at positions 119 and 320, both lysine residues.

=== Subcellular Localization ===
The C11orf49 protein found in humans is predicted to be localized in the cytoplasm.

== Gene Level Regulation ==
=== Promoters ===
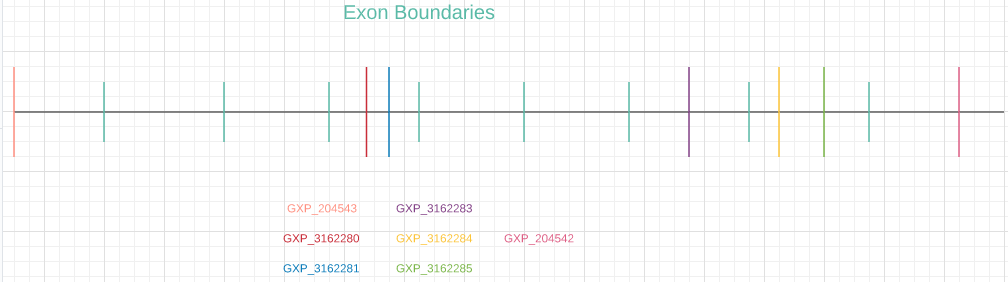
Promoter locations on C11orf49 gene found in humans

There are 7 promoters listed on Genomatix, however only one of the promoters (GXP_204543) starts at the beginning of the C11orf49 gene that is found in humans, and also has the greatest number of encoding transcripts.

Promoter ID	Start Position	End Position	Size (bp)	Orientation	Total # of transcripts
GXP_204543	46935524	46936819	1296	plus strand	32
GXP_3162280	47050923	47051962	1040	plus strand	1
GXP_3162281	47051454	47052500	1047	plus strand	2
GXP_3162283	47136696	47137735	1040	plus strand	1
GXP_3162284	47153395	47154434	1040	plus strand	1
GXP_3162285	47153944	47154983	1040	plus strand	1
GXP_204542	47159105	47160144	1040	plus strand	1

Table 4. List of promoters associated with the C11orf49 human gene.

=== Transcription Factors ===
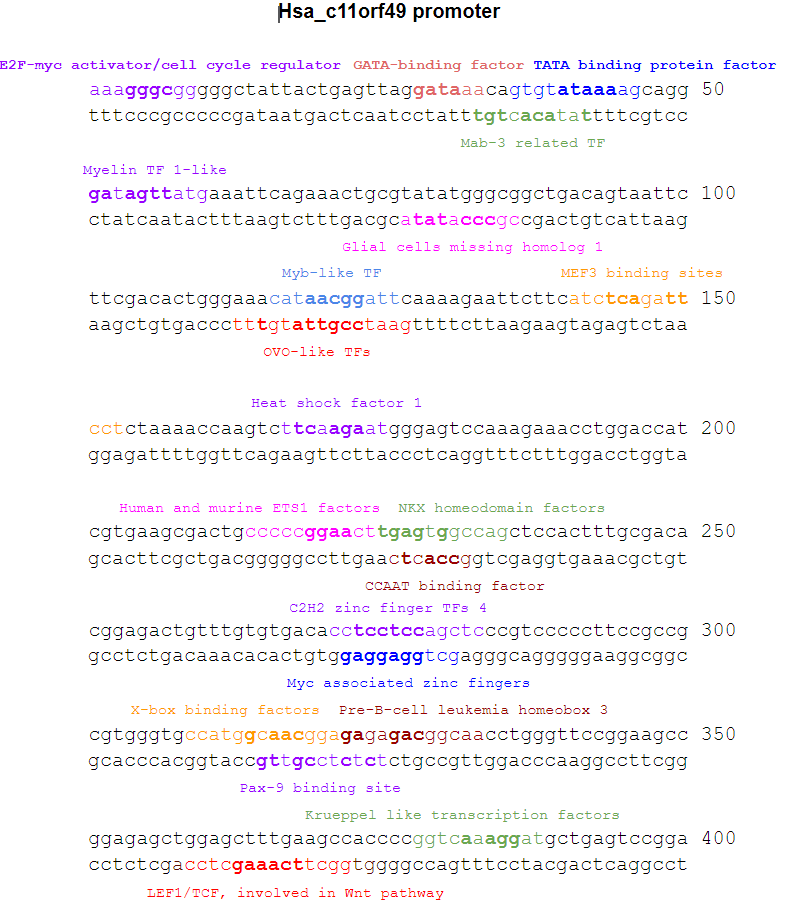
Transcription factor binding sites for C11orf49 promoter found in humans

The following transcription factors are predicted to bind to the GXP_204543 promoter. The higher the matrix score, the more likely the transcription factor is to bind to the promoter. Information on where these transcription factors bind on the GXP_204543 promoter is showcased in the image to the right of the page.

Matrix Family	Detailed Family Info	Detailed Matrix Info	Matrix Score
V$NKXH	NKX homeodomain factors	Homeodomain factor NKX-2.5	1
V$GATA	GATA binding factor	GATA-binding factor 3	0.992
V$LEFF	LEF1/TCF	Involved in the Wnt signal pathway	0.991
O$VTBP	Vertebrate TATA binding factor	Cellular and viral TATA box elements	0.99
V$KLFS	Krueppel like TFs	Gut-enriched Krueppel-like TF	0.982
V$MYBL	Cellular and Viral myb-like TFs	V-Myb	0.978
V$E2FF	E2F-myc activator	E2F TF 1	0.976
V$MEF3	MEF3 binding sites	Sine oculis homeobox homolog 2	0.972
V$XBBF	X-box binding factors	X-box binding protein RFX1	0.966
V$ETSF	Human and murine ETS1 factors	Elk-1	0.958
V$PBXC	PBX-MEIS complexes	Pre-B-cell leukemia homeobox 3	0.949
V$CAAT	CCAAT binding factors	Cellular and viral CCAAT box	0.927
V$HEAT	Heat shock factors	Heat shock factor 1	0.927
V$MYT1	MYT1 C2HC zinc finger protein	Myelin TF 1-like, neuronal C2H2 ZF 1	0.925
V$GCMF	Chorion-specific TFs	Glial cells missing homolog 1	0.902
V$ZF04	C2H2 zinc finger TF 4	Zinc finger and BTB domain	0.9
V$MAZF	Myc associated zinc fingers (MAZ)	MAZ	0.875
V$PAX9	Pax-9 binding sites	Zebrafish Pax-9 binding site	0.848
V$DMRT	DM domain-containing TFs	Mab-3 related TF 1	0.817

Table 5. List of binding transcription factors to the GXP_204543 promoter.

=== Gene Expression ===
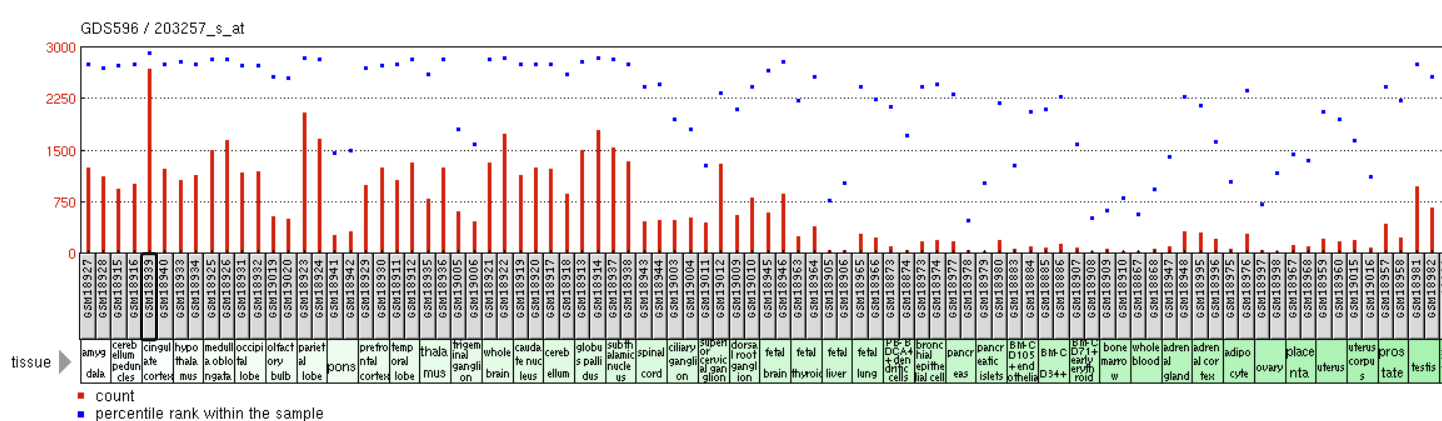
Microarray expression patterns for C11orf49

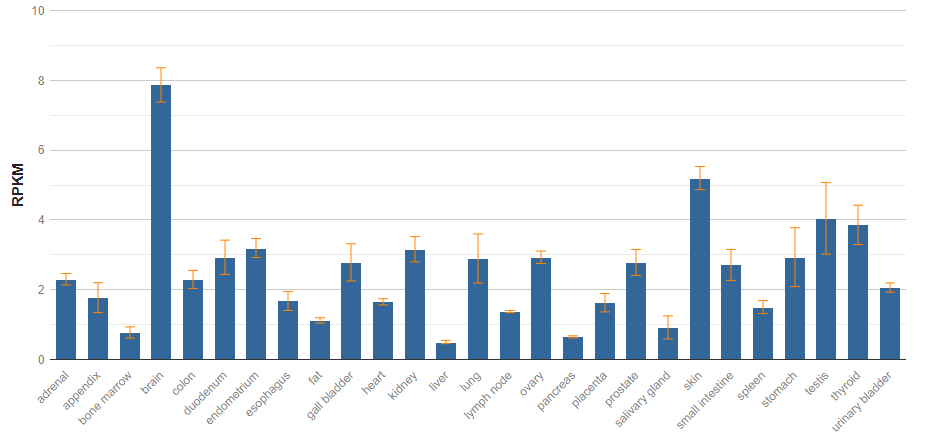
C11orf49 RNA-Seq data

==== Tissue Specific Expression ====
Both microarray expression patterns and RNA-Seq data show very high levels of expression in the brain. RNA-Seq data also shows high expression in lung fetal tissue. Additional information for other tissues is included to the right of the page.

==== Conditions of Differentiated Expression ====
C11orf49 expression is significantly increased after the overexpression of claudin-1 in lung adenocarcinoma cell lines. Claudin-1 specifically prevents paracellular diffusion of small molecules through tight junctions in the epidermis.

C11orf49 expression is significantly decreased after the treatment of camptothecin on a renal epithelial cell line. Camptothecin is an alkaloid that inhibits the nuclear enzyme DNA topoisomerase, and has exhibited antitumor activity. It has also shown the ability to cause apoptosis by changing the permeability of the mitochondrial membrane, releasing cytochrome C.

== Post-Transcription Regulation ==
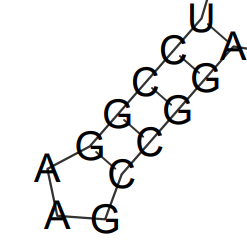
C11orf49 5' UTR Stem-Loop Structure

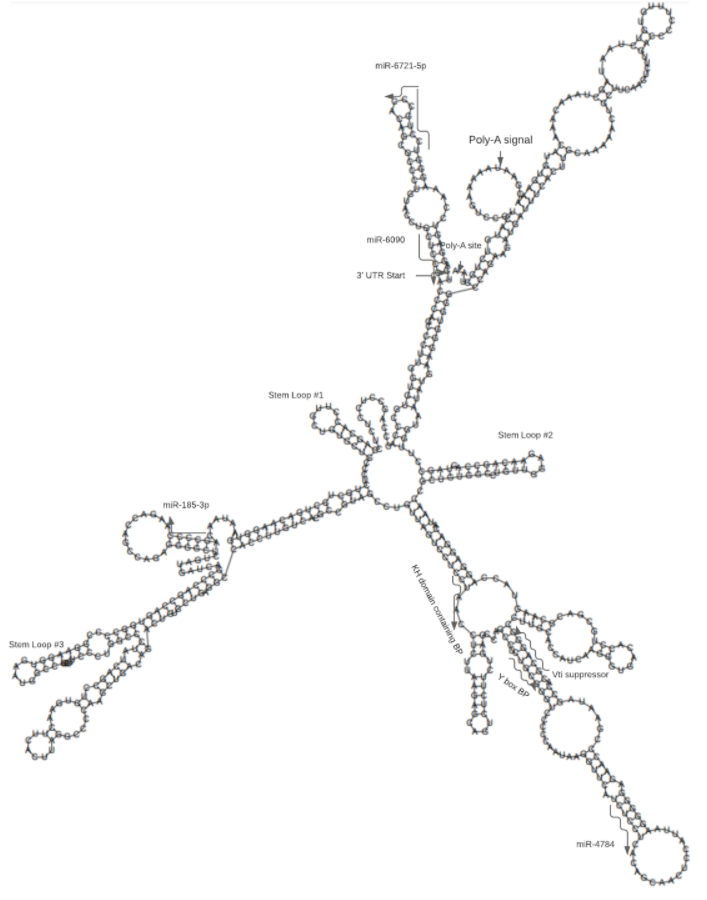
C11orf49 Transcript 3' UTR Stem-Loop Structures and miRNA Binding Sites

=== 5' UTR ===
There is a predicted stem-loop structure in the 5' UTR of the C11orf49 transcript from nucleotides 15-26 shown to the right of the page.

=== 3' UTR ===
There are predicted stem-loop structures and miRNA binding sites for the 3' UTR of the C11orf49 transcript shown to the right of the page.

== Protein-Protein Interactions ==
The database provided by PSICQUIC indicates that the C11orf49 protein found in humans interacts with the following proteins listed in Table 6. All interactions were determined using two-hybrid screening experiments.

Protein	Description
HTT	Huntingtin protein
APOE	Apolipoprotein E
PRKAR1A	cAMP-dependent protein kinase type I-alpha regulatory subunit
FH	Fumarate hydratase
GCA	Grancalcin
PHF1	PHD finger protein 1
VPS54	Vacuolar protein sorting-associated protein 54
ZFHX3	Zinc finger homeobox protein 3
RAB7L1	RAS oncogene family-like 1
NDRG1	Stress responsive protein
PNMA5	Paraneoplastic antigen-like protein 5
TXN2	Thioredoxin

Table 6. List of proteins that interact with the C11orf49 protein found in humans.

== Homology and Evolution ==
=== Orthologs and Paralogs ===
C11orf49 can be found among a wide variety of taxonomic groups, including but not limited to Mammalia, Aves, Reptilia, Amphibia, Cyprinidae, Hemichordata, Cnidaria, Platyhelminthes, Arthropoda, Placozoa, Choanoflagellate, Spizellomyces, and Oomycota. However, C11orf49 could not be found in Insecta or Plantae. There are no known paralogs of C11orf49.

Genus and Species	Common name	Taxonomic group	Divergence (MYA)	Accession #	AA length	Identity (%)	Similarity (%)
Mus musculus	Mouse	Rodentia	89	NP_780332.1	331	92	95.5
Gallus gallus	Chicken	Aves	318	XP_015142672.1	331	76.7	83.5
Chelonia mydas	Green Sea Turtle	Reptilia	318	XP_007054360.2	362	73.4	79.9
Geotrypetes seraphini	Gaboon caecilian	Amphibia	352	XP_033784118.1	329	69.9	81.7
Xenopus tropicalis	Tropical Clawed Frog	Amphibia	352	NM_001079316.1	330	61.9	77.3
Danio rerio	Zebrafish	Cyprinoidae	433	NP_001002479.1	331	54.7	72.2
Sacoglossus kowalevskii	Acorn Worm	Hemichordata	627	XP_006821066.1	299	43.6	58.2
Nematostella vectensis	Starlet Sea Anemone	Cnidaria	687	XP_032240720.1	300	42.4	57.3
Macrostomum lignano	Flatworm	Platyhelminthes	692	PAA77967.1	404	29.7	42.3
Stegodyphus mimosarum	African Velvet Spider	Arthropoda	736	KFM74201.1	321	24.3	38.5
Trichoplax adhaerens	Trichoplax	Placozoa	747	XP_002108042.1	263	24.7	39.6
Salpingoeca rosetta	N/A	Choanoflagellate	928	XP_004994083.1	231	15.5	25.5
Spizellomyces palustris	Australian fungus	Spizellomyces	1017	TPX67906.1	298	21.4	32.7
Saprolegnia diclina	Cotton Mould	Oomycota	1552	XP_008621502.1	314	22.9	35.6

Table 7. List of selected orthologs of C11orf49.

=== Evolution ===
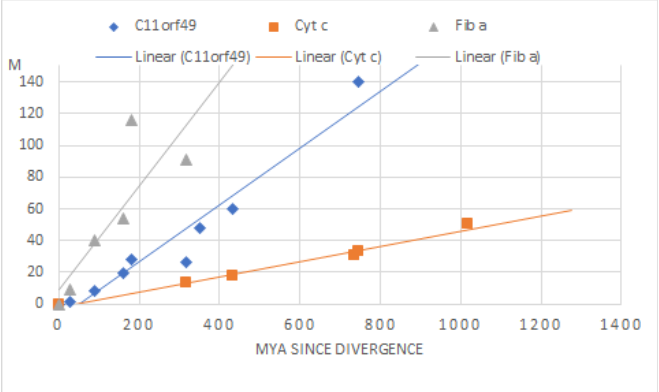
C11orf49 Evolutionary Rate Graph

==== History ====
Saprolegnia diclina is the most distantly related ortholog of C11orf49 known, with its divergence from ancestral humans approximately 1,552 MYA.

==== Evolutionary Rate ====
After performing a molecular clock analysis, C11orf49 has evolved at a faster rate than Cytochrome c but slower than Fibrinogen alpha. The graph containing this analysis is to the right of the page.

== Function ==
=== Protein Kinase Activity ===
C11orf49 is predicted to act as a cAMP-dependent protein kinase.

=== Clinical Significance ===
C11orf49 has been shown to interact with proteins HTT and APOE2, which are associated with Huntington's disease and Alzheimer's, respectively. Due to the predicted function of C11orf49, this interaction could be kinase-oriented.

C11orf49 expression is significantly increased after the overexpression of Claudin-1 in lung adenocarcinoma cells.

C11orf49 expression is significantly decreased after the treatment of camptothecin on a renal epithelial cell line.
