= RAB11B =

Protein-coding gene in the species Homo sapiens

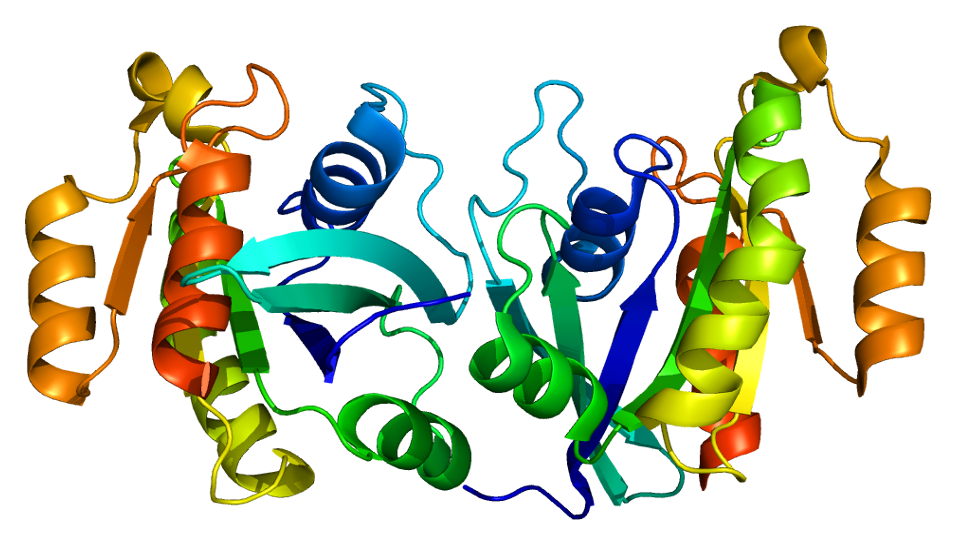

Identifiers
- Aliases: RAB11B, H-YPT3, member RAS oncogene family, NDAGSCW
- External IDs: OMIM: 604198; MGI: 99425; GeneCards: RAB11B
Available structures
PDB	Ortholog search: PDBe RCSB
PDB	List of PDB id codes 2F9L, 2F9M, 4OJK
Enzyme activity
EC #	BRENDA	ExPASy	KEGG	MetaCyc
3.6.5.2	↗	↗	↗	↗

Gene location (Human)
Chr.	Chromosome 19 (human)
Band	19p13.2	Start	8,389,981 bp
Band	19p13.2	End	8,404,434 bp

Gene location (Mouse)
Chr.	Chromosome 17 (mouse)
Band	17 B1|17 17.98 cM	Start	33,961,458 bp
Band	17 B1|17 17.98 cM	End	33,979,504 bp
RNA expression pattern
Bgee	Human / Mouse (ortholog); Top expressed in: right lobe of thyroid gland; left lobe of thyroid gland; C1 segment; right uterine tube; right hemisphere of cerebellum; right auricle of heart; popliteal artery; tibial arteries; ganglionic eminence; apex of heart / Top expressed in: superior frontal gyrus; genital tubercle; ventricular zone; muscle of thigh; dentate gyrus of hippocampal formation granule cell; lip; granulocyte; tail of embryo; neural layer of retina; esophagus; More reference expression data
BioGPS	n/a
Gene ontology
Molecular function	nucleotide binding; GDP binding; GTP binding; myosin V binding; protein binding; GTPase activity; cadherin binding
Cellular component	cytoplasm; recycling endosome; endosome; phagocytic vesicle membrane; membrane; synaptic vesicle; synapse; synaptic vesicle membrane; phagocytic vesicle; mitochondrion; extracellular exosome; cytoplasmic vesicle; cytosol; cell junction; recycling endosome membrane; anchored component of synaptic vesicle membrane
Biological process	regulation of protein localization to cell surface; transferrin transport; regulation of endocytic recycling; establishment of protein localization to membrane; cellular response to acidic pH; constitutive secretory pathway; receptor recycling; melanosome transport; transport; protein transport; regulated exocytosis; regulation of anion transport; insulin secretion involved in cellular response to glucose stimulus; membrane organization; post-translational protein modification; intracellular protein transport; exocytosis; Rab protein signal transduction; amyloid-beta clearance by transcytosis
Sources:Amigo / QuickGO
Orthologs
Databases	NCBI: entry; OMA: entry
Species	Human	Mouse
Entrez	9230	19326
Ensembl	ENSG00000185236	ENSMUSG00000077450
UniProt	Q15907	P46638
RefSeq (mRNA)	NM_004218	NM_008997
RefSeq (protein)	NP_004209	NP_033023
Location (UCSC)	Chr 19: 8.39 – 8.4 Mb	Chr 17: 33.96 – 33.98 Mb
PubMed search
- Wikidata
View/Edit Human	View/Edit Mouse

Ras-related protein Rab-11B is a protein that in humans is encoded by the RAB11B gene. Rab11b is reported as most abundantly expressed in brain, heart and testes.

Rab (Ras-related in brain) proteins form the largest section of the Ras superfamily of small GTPases. The Rab family proteins regulate intracellular membrane trafficking processes including vesicle budding, tethering, and fusion. The isoforms Rab11a, Rab11b, and Rab11c/Rab25 constitute the Rab11 subfamily based on specific sequence motifs. While RAB11A is located on chromosome 15 and RAB11C on chromosome 1, RAB11B is placed on chromosome 19. Rab11 proteins are implicated in endocytosis and exocytosis. Rab11b is reported as most abundantly expressed in brain, heart and testes. Early studies with deletions of RAB11 homologs in Saccharomyces cerevisiae proved their importance in cell survival. Despite sharing high sequence homology, Rab11a and Rab11b appear to reside within distinct vesicle compartments. Majority of Rab11b neither colocalize with transferrin receptor nor with the polymeric IgA receptor. This protein also exhibits a dependence on the microtubule cytoskeleton that is different from Rab11a. High sequence diversity in the C-terminal hypervariable region is responsible for variable membrane targeting between these proteins.

== Function ==
Members of the Rab11 subfamily act in recycling of proteins from the endosomes to the plasma membrane, in transport of molecules from the trans-Golgi network to the plasma membrane and in phagocytosis. This subfamily also acts in polarized transport in epithelial cells. Whereas most studies refer to the Rab11a isoform, little is known about Rab11b so far. Rab11b localizes predominantly in the pericentriolar recycling compartment and serves as an important component of the vesicular machinery. It is required for the transfer of internalized transferrin from the recycling compartment to the plasma membrane for which active Rab11b as well as GTP hydrolysis is necessary.

== Structure ==
All Ras GTPases consist of a similar core structure and highly conserved P-loop, switch 1 and switch 2 regions. The Rab11b monomer exhibits a typical Ras-like, small GTPase fold with a six stranded β-sheet core (β1-β6) surrounded by five major α-helices (α1-α5) and one minor α-helix (α6). According to the sequence similarity to other Rab GTPases can be assumed that they show closely resembling characteristics in nucleotide binding and hydrolysis. However, Rab11 isoforms could differ in hydrolysis kinetics owing to the differences in conformation, since Rab11a and Rab11b do not show an α-helical switch 2 region like other Rab GTPases. Rab11b shares 90% amino acid identity to Rab11a. Kinetic experiments with Rab11a/b and Rab11-interacting proteins (FIPs) indicate that FIPs cannot differentiate between GTP-bound Rab11a and Rab11b in vitro. The major divergence reveals in the inactive state. While Pasqualato et al. crystallized inactive Rab11a as a dimer in the asymmetric unit, Scapin et al. observed single crystallographically independent monomers of both the GDP- and the GppNHp-bound Rab11b structures.

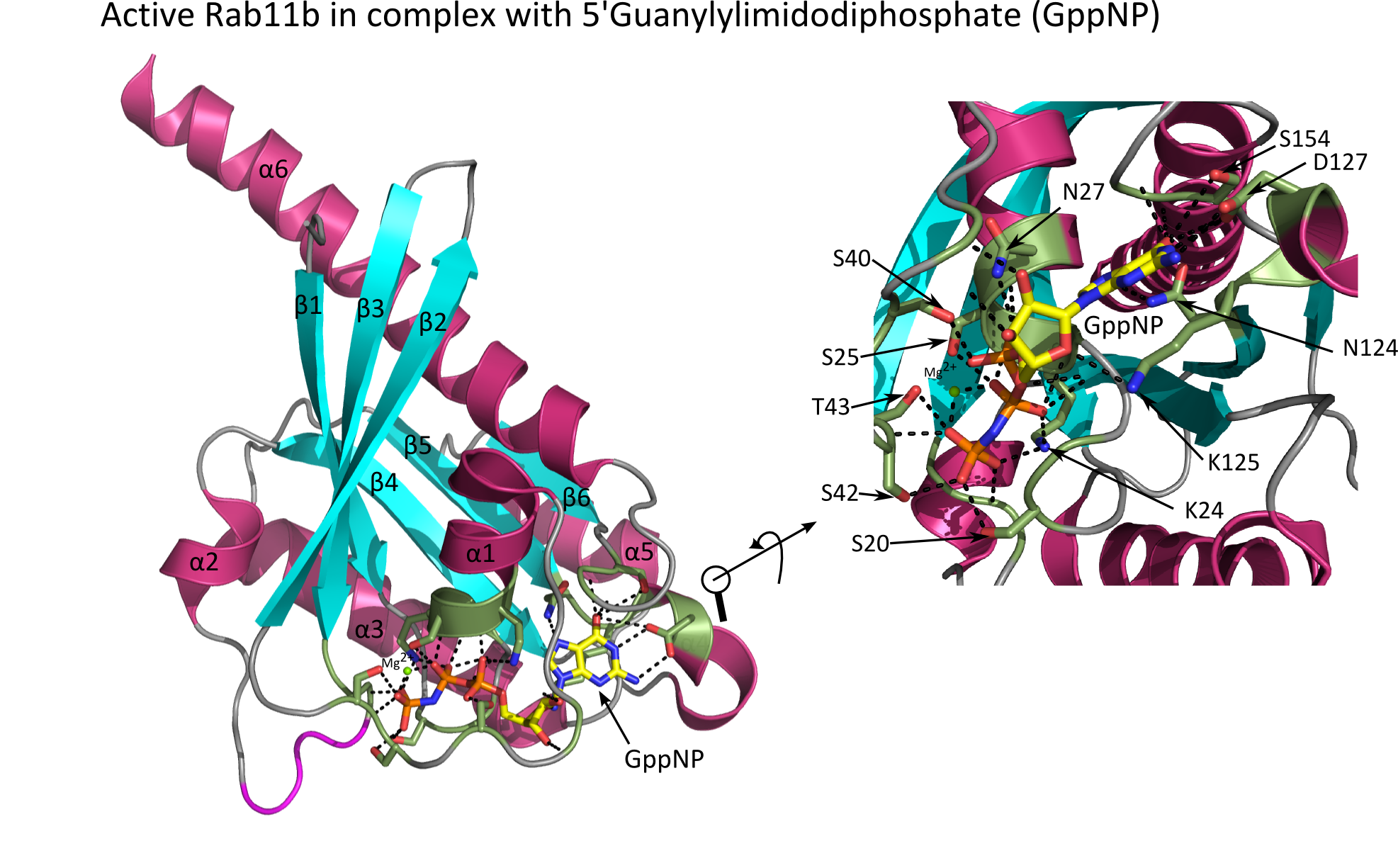
Cartoon model of active Rab11b-GppNP complex (PDB-ID: 2F9M). This model includes amino acids 8–188. The model shows classic Ras-like structure with a six stranded beta sheet core encircled by 5 major and one minor α-helix. GppNp and Mg2+ form polar bonds with the residues S20, K24, S25, N27, S40/S42/T43 (switch1), N124, K125, D127, S154, and with some parts of the backbone highlighted in olive green. Hydrogen-bonds are drawn as black dots. Atoms of GppNP, Mg2+, and sidechains are colored corresponding to their element. O = red, N = blue, P = orange, and Mg = green. The purple sequence represents the Rab-typical α310 helix region.

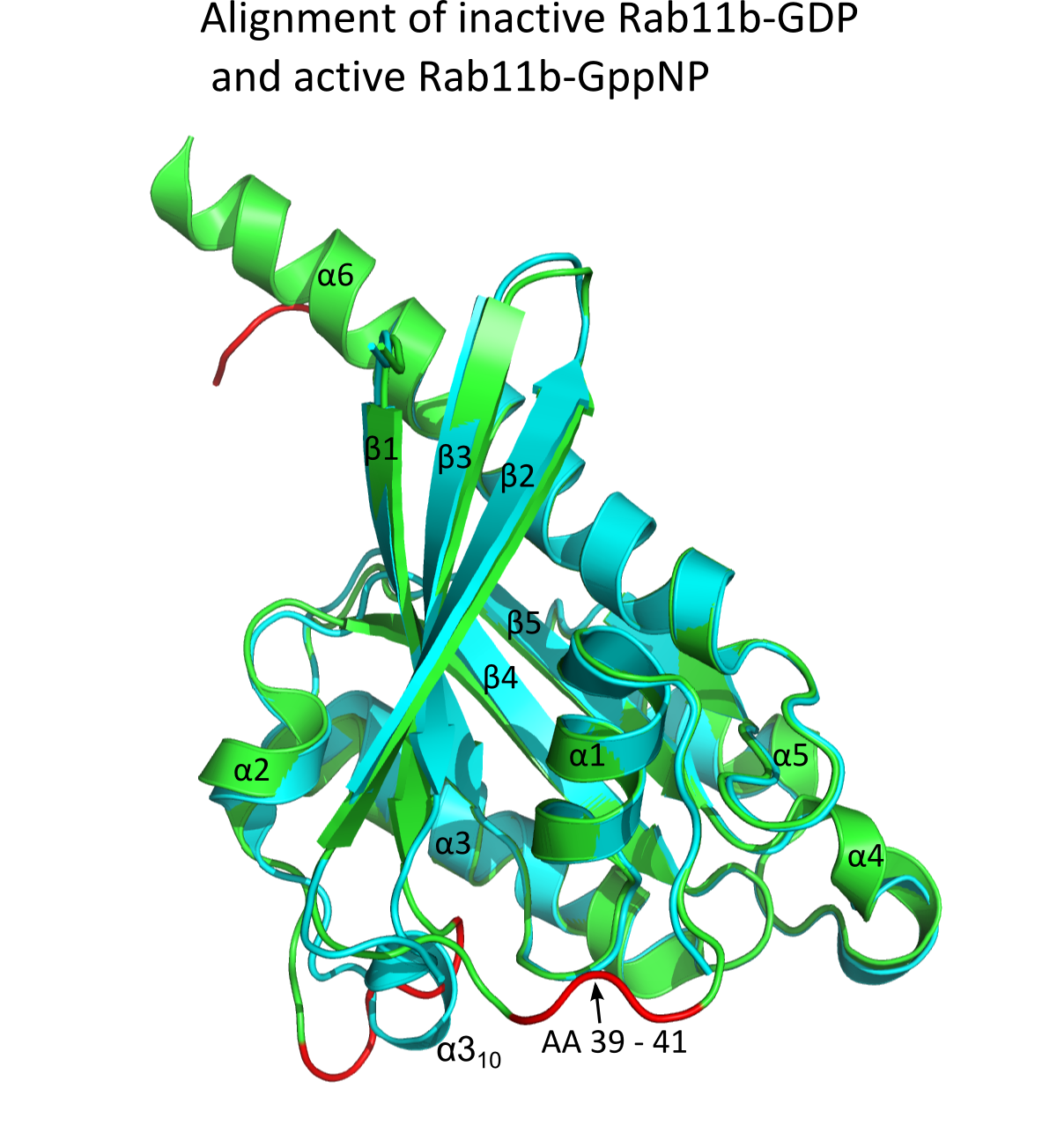
Alignment of inactive and active Rab11b (PDB-IDs: 2F9L/2F9M). The alignment shows slight conformational differences between the GDP- and the GppNP-bound form. Major divergences are displayed in red. The Rab11b-GDP structure shows the α310 helix in the switch 2 region whereas Rab11b-GppNP does not. Rab11b-GDP model lacks in the switch 1 section 39–41. These amino acids could not be modeled from the electron density map. Due to the lack in switch 1 structure, the two states are not comparable from these models. Furthermore, the inactive state shows a truncated α-6 helix.

== Clinical significance ==
Due to their crucial importance in vesicle transport and recycling, Rab11 proteins are linked to various non-pathogen or pathogen induced diseases. Most of the published data do not specify whether it is the a- or the b-isoform. Rab11 proteins have been implicated in Alzheimer's disease, Arthrogryposis-renal dysfunction-cholestasis (ARC), Batten disease, and Charcot-Marie-Tooth Neuropathy Type 4C (CMT4C). Intracellular bacteria Chlamydia pneumoniae and Chlamydia trachomatis that replicate in membrane bound compartments hijack the trafficking machinery recruiting Rab GTPases to promote their replication within the host cell. Knock down of Rab11 decreased the formation of infectious particles. Recent studies report a similar use of intracellular trafficking by Hantavirus and Influenza A virus. Replicated viruses benefit from Rab11 mediated recycling endosome pathway to exit the cell and infect surrounding tissue.
