= DIRAS3 =

Mammalian protein found in humans

Identifiers
- Aliases: DIRAS3, ARHI, NOEY2, DIRAS family GTPase 3
- External IDs: OMIM: 605193; GeneCards: DIRAS3

Gene location (Human)
Chr.	Chromosome 1 (human)
Band	1p31.3	Start	68,045,886 bp
Band	1p31.3	End	68,051,717 bp
RNA expression pattern
Bgee	Human / Mouse (ortholog); Top expressed in: anterior pituitary; hypothalamus; left ovary; nucleus accumbens; right ovary; oocyte; apex of heart; body of pancreas; germinal epithelium; right adrenal cortex / n/a; More reference expression data
BioGPS	n/a
Gene ontology
Molecular function	nucleotide binding; GTP binding; protein binding; GTPase activity; GDP binding
Cellular component	plasma membrane; membrane; intracellular anatomical structure
Biological process	regulation of gene expression by genetic imprinting; regulation of cyclin-dependent protein serine/threonine kinase activity; signal transduction; small GTPase mediated signal transduction
Sources:Amigo / QuickGO
Orthologs
Databases	NCBI: entry; OMA: entry
Species	Human	Mouse
Entrez	9077	n/a
Ensembl	ENSG00000162595	n/a
UniProt	O95661	n/a
RefSeq (mRNA)	NM_004675	n/a
RefSeq (protein)	NP_004666	n/a
Location (UCSC)	Chr 1: 68.05 – 68.05 Mb	n/a
PubMed search		n/a
- Wikidata
View/Edit Human

GTP-binding protein Di-Ras3 (DIRAS3) also known as aplysia ras homology member I (ARHI) is a protein that in humans is encoded by the DIRAS3 gene.

This gene is a member of the Ras superfamily and is expressed in normal ovarian and breast epithelial cells but not in ovarian and breast cancers. It is a maternally imprinted gene, with monoallelic expression of the paternal allele, which is associated with growth suppression. Thus, this gene appears to be a putative tumor suppressor gene whose function is abrogated in ovarian and breast cancers.

DIRAS3 is linked to breast cancer as well as ovarian cancer. The DIRAS3 gene includes one promoter, two exons and one intron with a 687 bp protein-coding region that encodes a 26-kDa protein. The DIRAS3 protein is a GTPase belonging to the Ras superfamily and shares 50–60% homology with Ras and Rap, two other small GTP binding proteins. Reduced expression of DIRAS3 has been reported in 70% of invasive breast cancers.

== Structure and function ==
While ARHI is structurally similar to other GTPase proteins, its function is remarkably different from Ras. Ras is an oncogenic protein involved in cellular proliferation and signal transduction, and while the Ras superfamily generally consists of positive growth regulators, ARHI is a tumor-suppressor gene. In contrast to Ras, ARHI works as an inhibitor for cell growth, thus functioning as a negative growth regulator. ARHI has also been shown to have less GTPase activity than most Ras proteins even though the proteins share a very similar structure.

The underlying cause for these dramatic differences in function is thought to be structural variations between ARHI and the Ras superfamily. The negative growth regulation exhibited by ARHI is most likely due to a unique 34-amino-acid N-terminus extension. This sequence is not generally found in the Ras superfamily, most of which show no inhibitory activity towards cell growth and even act as positive growth regulators. Deletion of this tail results in a significant drop in ARHI's ability to inhibit cell growth. This change in structure has no effect on protein expression levels or its GTP-binding ability, suggesting the extension's primary function is giving rise to this protein's negative growth regulation.

The reduced GTPase activity observed in ARHI is thought to arise from critical differences in three specific amino acid residues in the effector domain. These residues are highly conserved in other Ras proteins, and are critical for the GTPase activity. In Ras, they are specifically G^{12}, A^{59}, and Q^{61}. ARHI has three different amino acids in the effector domain: A^{46}, K^{93}, and G^{95}. While ARHI still binds GTP with high affinity, its hydrolysis of GTP to GDP is relatively low because of these differences.

== Role in cancer ==
While ARHI is constitutively expressed in normal ovarian and breast epithelial cells, it is absent in cancers found in these tissues where no expression of ARHI has been detected. In non-cancerous cells growth factor signals associate ARHI N- and C-terminally to the plasma membrane, where it can interact with C-RAF. This interaction inhibits the activation of MEK and ERK and even cell migration. In cancer tissues, where ARHI is not expressed, cells will thus migrate; this possibly is a cause for metastasis especially in breast cancer.

ARHI influences also the cell cycle, specifically ARHI's strong inhibition of the cyclin D1 promoter. Cyclin D1 is an essential protein in the cell's progression from G1 to S phase, and its regulation by ARHI is critical in maintaining healthy cells. This is the mechanism by which ARHI inhibits cell growth and acts as a negative growth regulator. A loss of ARHI function could result in out-of-control cell growth and, in fact, cyclin D1 is often up-regulated in ovarian cancers and invasive breast carcinomas when ARHI is found to be down-regulated. When ARHI is introduced into cancer cells lacking this gene, many responses occur in addition to cyclin D1 down-regulation. These include induction of p21, activation of JNK, and reduced signaling through the Ras/MAP pathway. Thus, loss of any of these processes (arising from loss of ARHI) can lead to cancer.

The "ARHI" gene is maternally imprinted (expressed monoallelically) and mapped specifically to 1p31, which is a common site for loss of heterozygosity (LOH). This locus on chromosome 1 is the most frequent deletion in breast and ovarian cancers. Because this gene is maternally imprinted, LOH of the nonimprinted allele (the paternal copy) confers a loss of ARHI expression. Although LOH has been reported in 40% of ovarian and breast cancers, another typical mechanism of gene silencing is through methylation. Since ARHI expression is decreased in 70% of invasive breast cancer, aberrant methylation is almost certainly the other common mechanism through which the gene is silenced. Found in "ARHI" are three CpG islands, which are common sites of epigenetic regulation, and hypermethylation of these regions in other tumor suppressor genes have been observed in various cancers. For example, decreased expression of BRCA1 in cancerous tissue has been linked with hypermethylation of the "BRCA1" promoter. Indeed, hypermethylation of certain CpG islands were associated with decreased expression of ARHI, and the protein showed a corresponding re-expression after demethylation of the regions.

Because the gene is imprinted, the two-hit tumorigenesis model proposed by Knudson is reduced to a more susceptible situation. The nonexpression of the maternal allele leaves the gene only one “strike” in terms of any number of mutational mechanisms, the two most common being LOH and hypermethylation of the gene promoter. In this way, the imprinted "ARHI" gene has a high risk of conferring cancers due to its susceptibility to mutations and epigenetic modifications.
