= RASEF =

Protein-coding gene in the species Homo sapiens

Identifiers
- Aliases: RASEF, RAB45, RAS and EF-hand domain containing, TSG
- External IDs: OMIM: 611344; MGI: 2448565; GeneCards: RASEF
Available structures
| PDB | Ortholog search: PDBe RCSB |
| PDB | List of PDB id codes 2P5S, 2PMY |
Enzyme activity
| EC # | BRENDA | ExPASy | KEGG | MetaCyc |
|---|---|---|---|---|
| 3.6.5.2 | ↗ | ↗ | ↗ | ↗ |

Gene location (Human)
| Chr. | Chromosome 9 (human) |
| Band | 9q21.32 | Start | 82,979,590 bp |
| Band | 9q21.32 | End | 83,063,177 bp |

Gene location (Mouse)
| Chr. | Chromosome 4 (mouse) |
| Band | 4|4 C3 | Start | 73,632,816 bp |
| Band | 4|4 C3 | End | 73,709,231 bp |
RNA expression pattern
| Bgee | Human / Mouse (ortholog); Top expressed in: pancreatic epithelial cell; mucosa of ileum; sperm; mucosa of sigmoid colon; pancreatic ductal cell; caput epididymis; epithelium of nasopharynx; secondary oocyte; bronchial epithelial cell; body of pancreas / Top expressed in: epithelium of stomach; left colon; parotid gland; conjunctival fornix; lobe of prostate; spermatid; transitional epithelium of urinary bladder; Paneth cell; vestibular membrane of cochlear duct; seminal vesicula; More reference expression data |
| BioGPS | n/a |
Gene ontology
| Molecular function | nucleotide binding; calcium ion binding; metal ion binding; GTPase activity; GTP binding; GDP binding; identical protein binding |
| Cellular component | cytoplasm; cytosol; perinuclear region of cytoplasm |
| Biological process | protein homooligomerization |
Sources:Amigo / QuickGO
Orthologs
| Databases | NCBI: entry; OMA: entry |
| Species | Human | Mouse |
| Entrez | 158158 | 242505 |
| Ensembl | ENSG00000165105 | ENSMUSG00000043003 |
| UniProt | Q8IZ41 | Q5RI75 |
| RefSeq (mRNA) | NM_152573 | NM_001017427 |
| RefSeq (protein) | NP_689786 | NP_001017427; NP_001391890; NP_001391891; NP_001391892 |
| Location (UCSC) | Chr 9: 82.98 – 83.06 Mb | Chr 4: 73.63 – 73.71 Mb |
| PubMed search |
- Wikidata
| View/Edit Human | View/Edit Mouse |

Ras and EF-hand domain-containing protein also known as Ras-related protein Rab-45 is a protein that in humans is encoded by the RASEF gene.

The RASEF gene is located on chromosome 9 (9q21.32).

== Introduction ==
RASEF belongs to the small GTPase family, which means that it's able to hydrolyse a molecule of GTP; known for its unusual conformation. In the small GTPase family it is classified in the RAS domain, a special group of oncogenes and oncoproteins that take part in the synthesis of molecules related to cell reproduction.

A feature of RASEF is its N-terminal EF-hand motif and C-terminal Rab-homology domain, that enables it to bind calcium. Lately, RASEF has been studied for its role as an oncoprotein. Investigating which mutations affect it and how we could inhibit them could allow us to fight cancers that have an elevated mortality rate, such as lung cancer.

=== Oncogenes ===
When studying cancer's molecular biology we can identify two types of genes that intervene in its development:

- Tumor suppressor genes: Inhibit tumor formation.
- Oncogenes: Stimulate cell proliferation. It is in this group where members of the RAS family are found.

Oncogenes generally code for growth factors and their receptors, enzymes related to transduction signal or for DNA transcription factors. When those genes suffer some kind of mutation or translocation, they can change their conformation and cause a catalytic activity in cell reproduction that is normally inactivated, which causes abnormal cell proliferation. This could provoke a malignant tumor if combined with a separate mutation in a protein's RAS group.

== Ras / Rab family ==
RASEF or Rab 45 is classified in the Ras superfamily, which includes small (20kDa) guanosine triphosphatases (GTPases). The basic members of this group of proteins are Ras oncogenes. It's divided into five major families (Ras, Rho, Arf/Sar, Ran and Rab). RASEF is included in the Rab family (the largest family), which is responsible for vesicular traffic of proteins between organelles via endocytotic and secretory pathways. Their function is to make budding from the donor compartment, transport, vesicle fusion and cargo release easier.

== Structure ==
RASEF is a 740 amino acids long protein which contains 3 distinct regions: 2 EF hand domains (which in turn contain 2 Calcium bindings and 3 nucleotide bindings -assumed by similarity with other proteins, without direct evidence-), a Coiled Coil region and a C-terminal Rab-homology domain.

=== Domains ===
==== N-terminal EF hand domain ====
Sequence found in RASEF protein that contains 35 amino acids (36 in the second one). The two EF hand domains are consecutively located at the “beginning” of the protein. Its name “N-terminal” indicates an amino group (characteristic of this group of biomolecules, as well as the C- terminal ending). The first one goes from the 8th amino acid to the 42nd, and the other to the 42nd to the 77th. “EF hand” refers to the shape of this domain (similarity with the right hand's morphology). Ca+2 ions are responsible for this structure, which by binding metals join two alpha helixes.

==== Coiled coil region ====
Structural motif in proteins: from two to seven alpha helixes entwined. Each one of these helixes is a repeated 7 amino acid sequence (HPPHCPC), where H refers to hydrophobic amino acids. The position of hydrophobic remains (alpha helix exterior) causes their amphipathic behaviour. The bond between different chains, produced in cytoplasm (aqueous region), is extremely tight, as Van der Waals forces appear between the hydrophobic radicals (H), surrounded by the hydrophilic amino acids (amphipathic molecule). This bond is known as the “Knobs into holes packing”. Coiled coil motif, located in the intermediate region of the protein, is responsible for self-interaction.

==== C-Terminal Rab-homology domain ====
Located at the end of the protein (opposite to N-terminal domain), it's a carboxyl group (COOH). In this region, there are guanine nucleotide bonds to tri-phosphates and di-phosphates. The variability of this domain is responsible for the high appearance of elements needed in the joints between proteins and their targets in the membrane. Both the C-Terminal Rab-homology domain and the intermediate region of the protein are responsible for the intracellular location of the protein (perinuclear region).

== Function ==
RASEF intervenes in a direct manner in biological processes such as protein transport and small GTPase mediated signal transduction. Its molecular functions include GTP binding and calcium ion binding.

As mentioned previously, RASEF has 3 distinct structural regions: the C-terminus Rab domain, the N-terminus EF-hand domain and the self-interacting mid-region. Each of these has an individual function.

The guanine-nucleotide forms of the Rab domain regulate the protein's localization. RASEF is mainly found in the perinuclear region of the cell. In addition, the protein's mid-region also seems to be involved in the perinuclear localization. This could be due to its interaction with membrane compartments. The EF-hand domain's function still remains to be discovered. However, it is speculated that due to its conformational changes upon binding with Ca2+ ions, and these being responsible for interactions with target molecules; that in cooperation with the Rab-domain, the EF-hand domain's main function is regulating membrane traffic. Over 60 Rab-family GTPase proteins have key roles in membrane traffic regulation. This isn't surprising given the amount and variety of intracellular compartments, which require a high level of control to ensure a proper delivery and fusion of vesicles at the correct site.

This connects the RASEF protein directly to cell-growth mechanisms, making it susceptible to having a decisive role in the apparition of cancerous cells.

== Clinical significance ==
Ras and Ef-hand domain containing proteins are commonly overexpressed in primary lung cancers and its intervention is crucial for the proliferation and survival of cancerous cells. Apart from binding calcium ions in the N-terminus, RASEF plays a significant role in lung cancer cell-growth. This occurs because of its interaction with ERK (extracellular signal-regulated kinase) molecules involved in the regulation of meiosis, mitosis, and postmitotic functions in differentiated cells, whose pathway can be activated by carcinogens or viral infections.

There is ongoing research that is studying the possibility of using RASEF as a clinically promising prognostic biomarker and therapeutic target for lung cancer. Some recent studies have revealed the viability of using RASEF as a target for this disease.

Also, a segregation study in families with uveal and cutaneous melanoma identified a potential locus harboring a tumor-suppressor gene (TSG). One of the genes in this area (9q21), RASEF, was then analyzed as a candidate TSG, but the lack of point mutations and copy number changes could not confirm this. Nowadays, the RASEF gene has been investigated for potential mutations and gene silencing by promoting methylation in uveal melanoma. It appears to be the mechanism targeting RASEF in uveal melanoma, and allelic imbalance at this locus supports a TSG role for the Ras and Ef-hand domain containing.
