= RERG =

Protein-coding gene in the species Homo sapiens

Identifiers
- Aliases: RERG, RAS like estrogen regulated growth inhibitor
- External IDs: OMIM: 612664; MGI: 2665139; GeneCards: RERG
Available structures
PDB	Ortholog search: PDBe RCSB
PDB	List of PDB id codes 2ATV
Enzyme activity
EC #	BRENDA	ExPASy	KEGG	MetaCyc
3.6.5.2	↗	↗	↗	↗

Gene location (Human)
Chr.	Chromosome 12 (human)
Band	12p12.3	Start	15,107,783 bp
Band	12p12.3	End	15,348,675 bp

Gene location (Mouse)
Chr.	Chromosome 6 (mouse)
Band	6|6 G1	Start	137,031,823 bp
Band	6|6 G1	End	137,147,495 bp
RNA expression pattern
Bgee	Human / Mouse (ortholog); Top expressed in: germinal epithelium; tail of epididymis; body of uterus; synovial joint; Achilles tendon; left uterine tube; caput epididymis; myometrium; saphenous vein; synovial membrane / Top expressed in: adrenal gland; facial motor nucleus; umbilical cord; molar; lumbar subsegment of spinal cord; dentate gyrus of hippocampal formation granule cell; body of femur; calvaria; conjunctival fornix; left lung lobe; More reference expression data
BioGPS	n/a
Gene ontology
Molecular function	nucleotide binding; GTP binding; GDP binding; estrogen receptor binding; GTPase activity
Cellular component	cytosol; nucleus; membrane; cytoplasm; plasma membrane
Biological process	negative regulation of cell population proliferation; response to hormone; negative regulation of cell growth; signal transduction; small GTPase mediated signal transduction; Ras protein signal transduction
Sources:Amigo / QuickGO
Orthologs
Databases	NCBI: entry; OMA: entry
Species	Human	Mouse
Entrez	85004	232441
Ensembl	ENSG00000134533	ENSMUSG00000030222
UniProt	Q96A58	Q8R367
RefSeq (mRNA)	NM_001190726; NM_032918	NM_001164212; NM_001164214; NM_181988
RefSeq (protein)	NP_001177655; NP_116307	NP_001157684; NP_001157686; NP_871788
Location (UCSC)	Chr 12: 15.11 – 15.35 Mb	Chr 6: 137.03 – 137.15 Mb
PubMed search
- Wikidata
View/Edit Human	View/Edit Mouse

RAS-like, estrogen-regulated, growth inhibitor is a protein in humans that is encoded by the RERG gene.

RERG, a member of the RAS superfamily of GTPases, inhibits cell proliferation and tumor formation (Finlin et al., 2001 [PubMed 11533059]).[supplied by OMIM, Mar 2009].
