= RAB5C =

Protein-coding gene in the species Homo sapiens

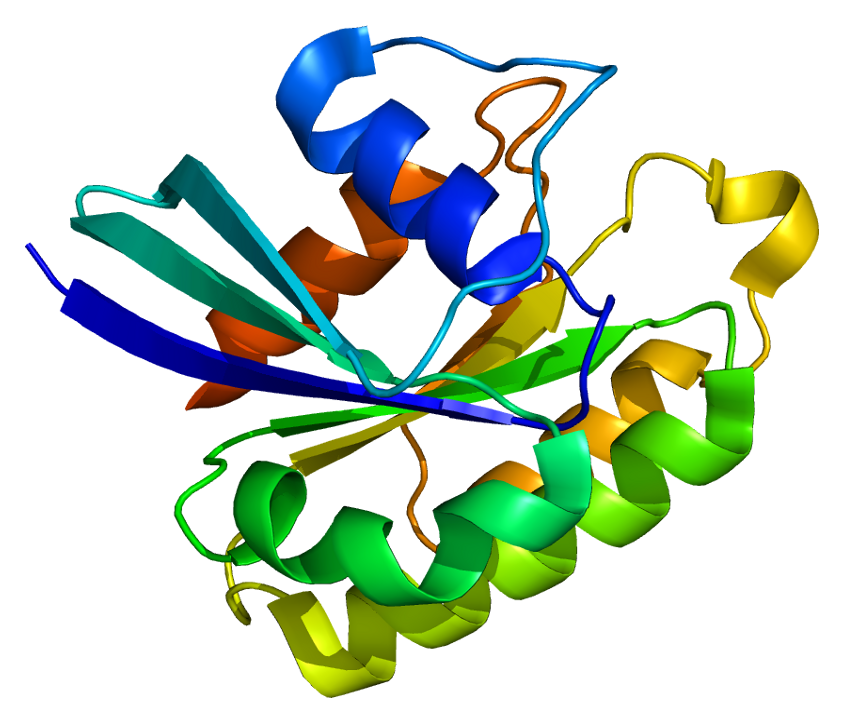

Identifiers
- Aliases: RAB5C, L1880, RAB5CL, RAB5L, RABL, member RAS oncogene family
- External IDs: OMIM: 604037; MGI: 105306; GeneCards: RAB5C
Available structures
PDB	Ortholog search: PDBe RCSB
PDB	List of PDB id codes 4KYI
Enzyme activity
EC #	BRENDA	ExPASy	KEGG	MetaCyc
3.6.5.2	↗	↗	↗	↗

Gene location (Human)
Chr.	Chromosome 17 (human)
Band	17q21.2	Start	42,124,978 bp
Band	17q21.2	End	42,155,044 bp

Gene location (Mouse)
Chr.	Chromosome 11 (mouse)
Band	11 D|11 63.54 cM	Start	100,605,835 bp
Band	11 D|11 63.54 cM	End	100,629,041 bp
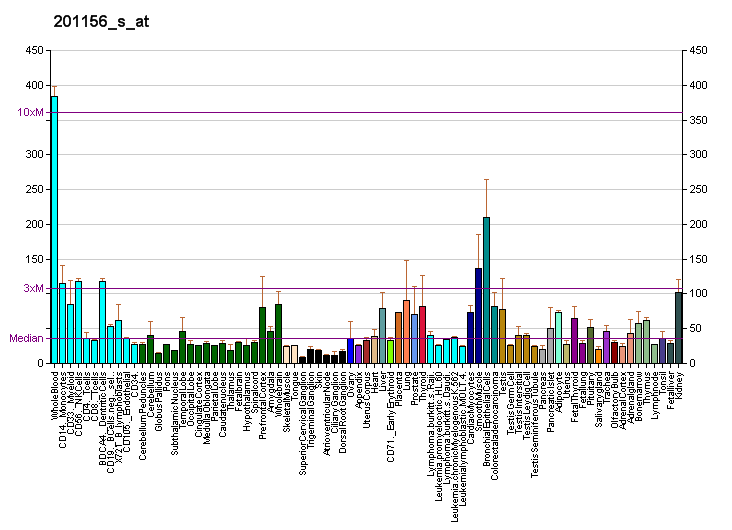

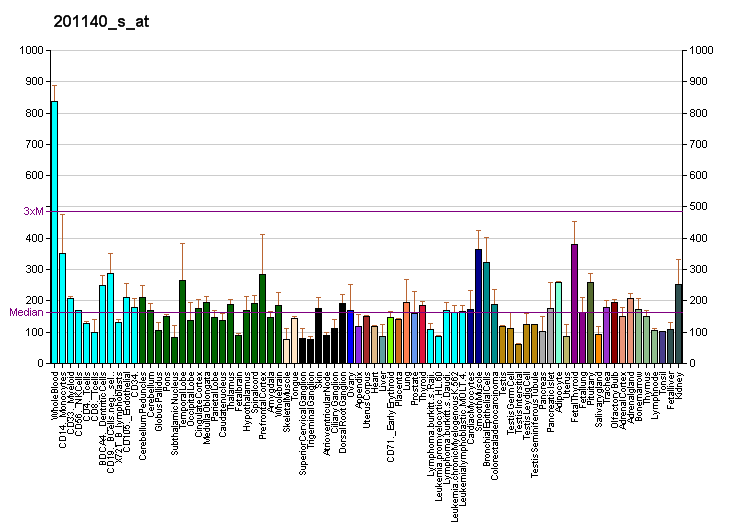
RNA expression pattern
Bgee	Human / Mouse (ortholog); Top expressed in: monocyte; granulocyte; right lung; upper lobe of left lung; right adrenal cortex; body of stomach; left adrenal gland; gallbladder; right coronary artery; right lobe of thyroid gland / Top expressed in: yolk sac; granulocyte; lip; intestinal villus; dentate gyrus of hippocampal formation granule cell; Ileal epithelium; superior frontal gyrus; gastrula; stroma of bone marrow; primary visual cortex; More reference expression data
BioGPS	More reference expression data
Gene ontology
Molecular function	nucleotide binding; GTP binding; protein binding; GDP binding; GTPase activity
Cellular component	melanosome; lysosomal membrane; endosome; lipid droplet; endocytic vesicle; early endosome; extracellular exosome; membrane; plasma membrane; early endosome membrane; azurophil granule membrane; cytoplasmic vesicle; anchored component of synaptic vesicle membrane; intracellular anatomical structure
Biological process	protein transport; regulation of endocytosis; plasma membrane to endosome transport; neutrophil degranulation; transport; intracellular protein transport; Rab protein signal transduction; small GTPase mediated signal transduction
Sources:Amigo / QuickGO
Orthologs
Databases	NCBI: entry; OMA: entry
Species	Human	Mouse
Entrez	5878	19345
Ensembl	ENSG00000108774	ENSMUSG00000019173
UniProt	P51148	P35278
RefSeq (mRNA)	NM_001252039; NM_004583; NM_201434	NM_024456; NM_001305003
RefSeq (protein)	NP_001238968; NP_004574; NP_958842	NP_001291932; NP_077776
Location (UCSC)	Chr 17: 42.12 – 42.16 Mb	Chr 11: 100.61 – 100.63 Mb
PubMed search
- Wikidata
View/Edit Human	View/Edit Mouse

Ras-related protein Rab-5C is a protein that in humans is encoded by the RAB5C gene. RAB5C belongs to the Ras-related protein family.
