= GRLF1 =

Protein-coding gene in the species Homo sapiens

ARHGAP35
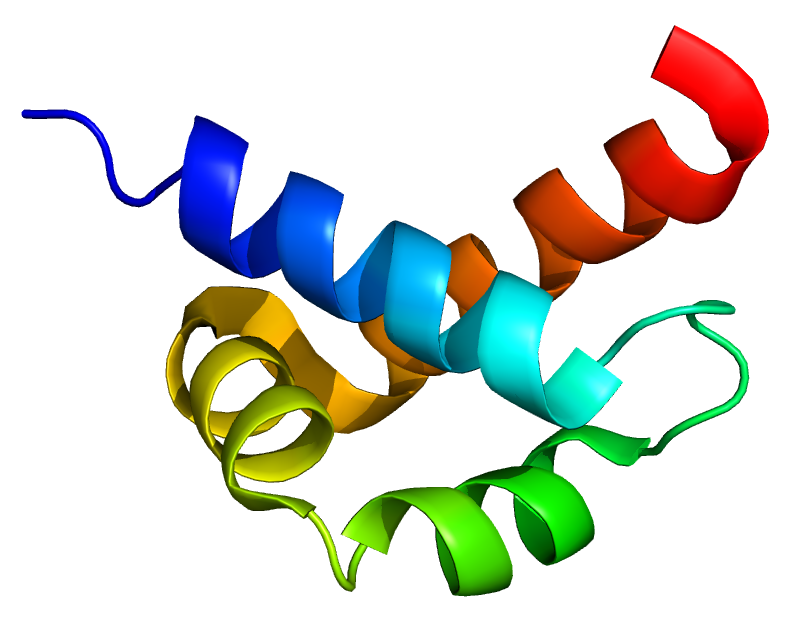

Identifiers
- Aliases: ARHGAP35, GRF-1, GRLF1, P190-A, P190A, p190ARhoGAP, p190RhoGAP, Rho GTPase activating protein 35
- External IDs: OMIM: 605277; MGI: 1929494; GeneCards: ARHGAP35
Available structures
PDB	Ortholog search: PDBe RCSB
PDB	List of PDB id codes 2K85, 3C5H, 3FK2

Gene location (Human)
Chr.	Chromosome 19 (human)
Band	19q13.32	Start	46,860,997 bp
Band	19q13.32	End	47,005,077 bp

Gene location (Mouse)
Chr.	Chromosome 7 (mouse)
Band	7|7 A2	Start	16,227,644 bp
Band	7|7 A2	End	16,348,918 bp
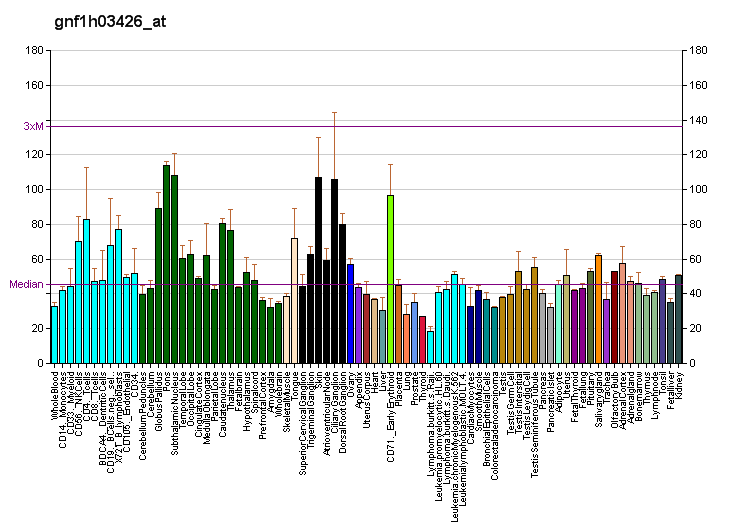

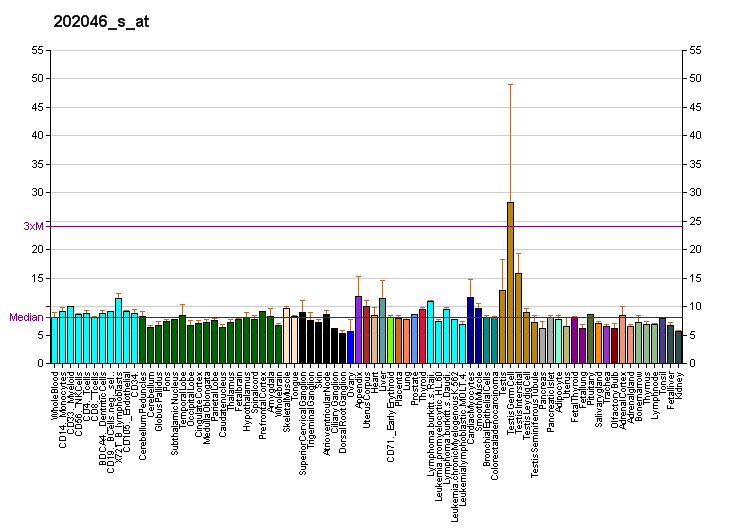

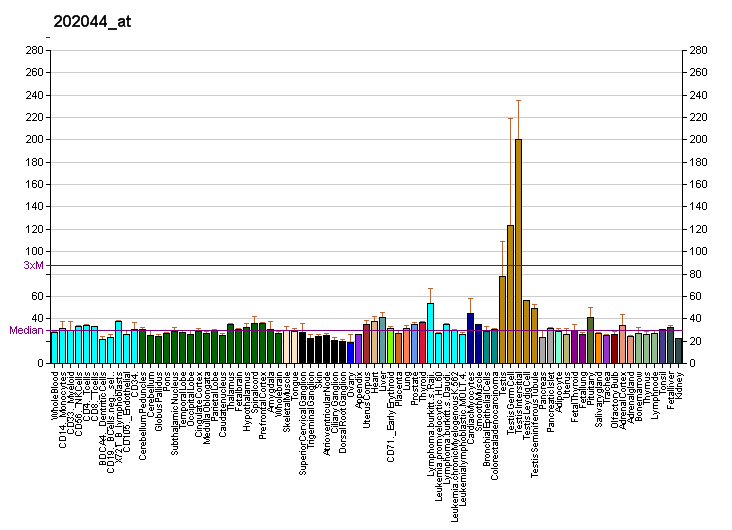
RNA expression pattern
Bgee	Human / Mouse (ortholog); Top expressed in: Brodmann area 23; endothelial cell; middle temporal gyrus; postcentral gyrus; entorhinal cortex; superior vestibular nucleus; left testis; pars compacta; superior frontal gyrus; right testis / Top expressed in: saccule; otic placode; genital tubercle; otic vesicle; tail of embryo; dentate gyrus of hippocampal formation granule cell; visual cortex; primary visual cortex; superior frontal gyrus; secondary oocyte; More reference expression data
BioGPS	More reference expression data
Gene ontology
Molecular function	DNA binding; RNA polymerase II transcription regulatory region sequence-specific DNA binding; transcription corepressor activity; GTP binding; DNA-binding transcription repressor activity, RNA polymerase II-specific; phospholipid binding; GTPase activator activity; GTPase activity; nucleotide binding; lipid binding
Cellular component	cytoplasm; cytosol; actin cytoskeleton; nucleus; cytoskeleton; cell projection; plasma membrane; membrane; ciliary basal body
Biological process	regulation of transcription, DNA-templated; negative regulation of Rho protein signal transduction; negative regulation of transcription by RNA polymerase II; transcription, DNA-templated; neural tube closure; regulation of cell shape; forebrain development; camera-type eye development; negative regulation of transcription, DNA-templated; regulation of small GTPase mediated signal transduction; signal transduction; negative regulation of vascular permeability; positive regulation of GTPase activity; axon guidance; axonal fasciculation; regulation of actin polymerization or depolymerization; positive regulation of neuron projection development; cell migration; central nervous system neuron axonogenesis; mammary gland development; establishment or maintenance of actin cytoskeleton polarity; cellular response to extracellular stimulus; regulation of actin cytoskeleton organization; wound healing, spreading of cells; positive regulation of cilium assembly; regulation of axonogenesis; neuron projection guidance
Sources:Amigo / QuickGO
Orthologs
Databases	NCBI: entry; OMA: entry
Species	Human	Mouse
Entrez	2909	232906
Ensembl	ENSG00000160007	ENSMUSG00000058230
UniProt	Q9NRY4	Q91YM2
RefSeq (mRNA)	NM_004491; NM_024342	NM_172739
RefSeq (protein)	NP_004482	NP_766327
Location (UCSC)	Chr 19: 46.86 – 47.01 Mb	Chr 7: 16.23 – 16.35 Mb
PubMed search
- Wikidata
View/Edit Human	View/Edit Mouse

Glucocorticoid receptor repression factor 1 (or GRF-1) is a protein that in humans is encoded by the ARHGAP35 gene (previously GRLF1). Preliminary evidence suggests that it functions to repress transcription of the glucocorticoid receptor, though this remains uncertain without further evidence.

== Function ==
The human glucocorticoid receptor DNA binding factor, which associates with the promoter region of the glucocorticoid receptor gene (hGR gene), is a repressor of glucocorticoid receptor transcription. The amino acid sequence deduced from the cDNA sequences show the presence of three sequence motifs characteristic of a zinc finger and one motif suggestive of a leucine zipper in which 1 cysteine is found instead of all leucines. The GRLF1 enhances the homologous down-regulation of wild-type hGR gene expression. Biochemical analysis suggests that GRLF1 interaction is sequence specific and that transcriptional efficacy of GRLF1 is regulated through its interaction with specific sequence motif. The level of expression is regulated by glucocorticoids.
