= RAB26 =

Protein-coding gene in the species Homo sapiens

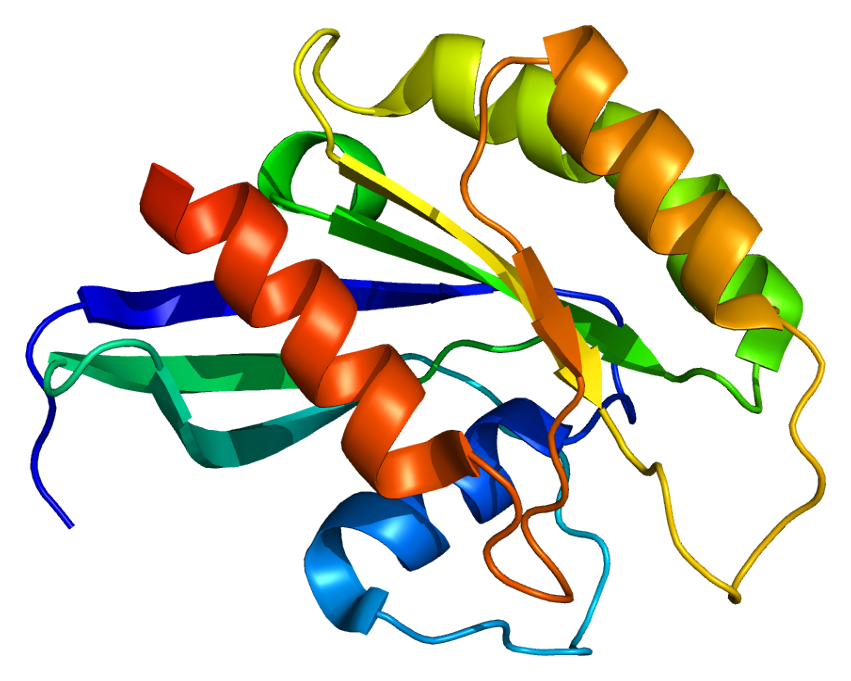

Identifiers
- Aliases: RAB26, V46133, member RAS oncogene family
- External IDs: OMIM: 605455; MGI: 2443284; GeneCards: RAB26
Available structures
PDB	Ortholog search: PDBe RCSB
PDB	List of PDB id codes 2G6B
Enzyme activity
EC #	BRENDA	ExPASy	KEGG	MetaCyc
3.6.5.2	↗	↗	↗	↗

Gene location (Human)
Chr.	Chromosome 16 (human)
Band	16p13.3	Start	2,140,803 bp
Band	16p13.3	End	2,154,165 bp

Gene location (Mouse)
Chr.	Chromosome 17 (mouse)
Band	17|17 A3.3	Start	24,746,215 bp
Band	17|17 A3.3	End	24,753,184 bp
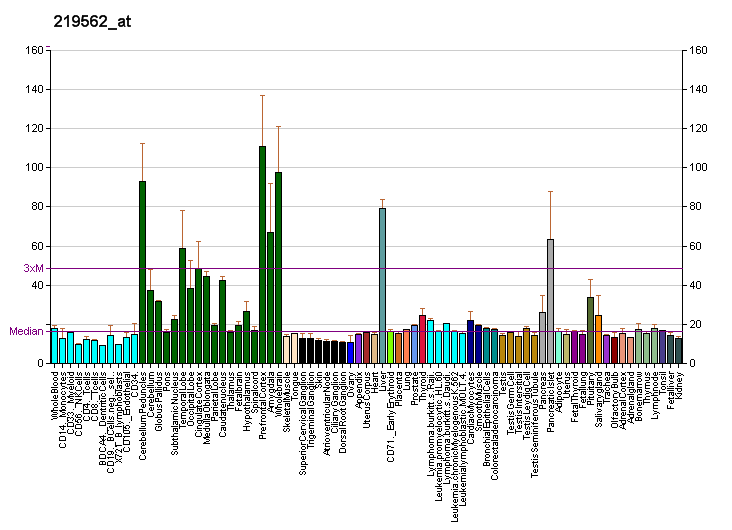

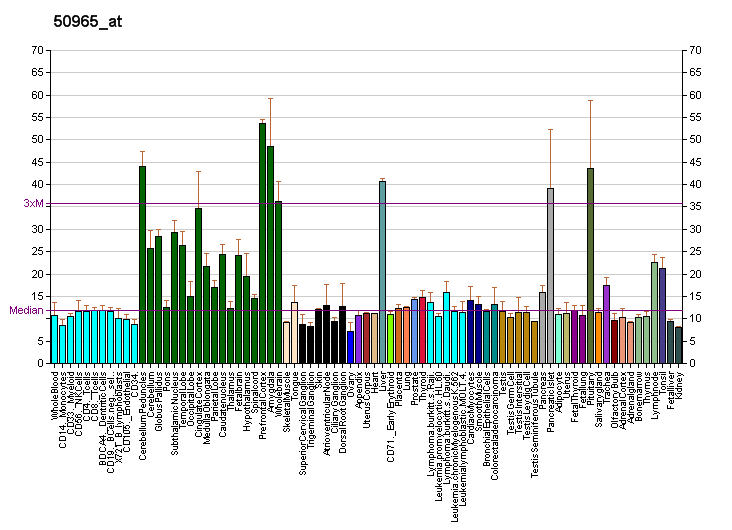
RNA expression pattern
Bgee	Human / Mouse (ortholog); Top expressed in: right hemisphere of cerebellum; cerebellar vermis; right frontal lobe; putamen; nucleus accumbens; caudate nucleus; anterior cingulate cortex; Brodmann area 9; parotid gland; body of pancreas / Top expressed in: dentate gyrus of hippocampal formation granule cell; superior frontal gyrus; primary visual cortex; otic vesicle; parotid gland; hippocampus proper; Region I of hippocampus proper; lacrimal gland; temporal lobe; prefrontal cortex; More reference expression data
BioGPS	More reference expression data
Gene ontology
Molecular function	nucleotide binding; GTP binding; protein binding; GMP binding; GTPase activity
Cellular component	intrinsic component of plasma membrane; Golgi membrane; Golgi apparatus; transport vesicle membrane; membrane; cytoplasmic vesicle; endosome; plasma membrane; synaptic vesicle; secretory granule membrane; anchored component of synaptic vesicle membrane
Biological process	protein transport; exocrine system development; regulated exocytosis; Golgi to plasma membrane protein transport; vesicle docking involved in exocytosis; protein secretion; regulation of exocytosis; intracellular protein transport; Rab protein signal transduction; regulation of protein catabolic process at presynapse, modulating synaptic transmission
Sources:Amigo / QuickGO
Orthologs
Databases	NCBI: entry; OMA: entry
Species	Human	Mouse
Entrez	25837	328778
Ensembl	ENSG00000167964	ENSMUSG00000079657
UniProt	Q9ULW5	Q504M8
RefSeq (mRNA)	NM_001308053; NM_014353	NM_177375
RefSeq (protein)	NP_001294982; NP_055168	NP_796349
Location (UCSC)	Chr 16: 2.14 – 2.15 Mb	Chr 17: 24.75 – 24.75 Mb
PubMed search
- Wikidata
View/Edit Human	View/Edit Mouse

Ras-related protein Rab-26 is a protein that in humans is encoded by the RAB26 gene.
