= RAP2B =

Protein-coding gene in the species Homo sapiens

Identifiers
- Aliases: RAP2B, member of RAS oncogene family
- External IDs: OMIM: 179541; MGI: 1921262; GeneCards: RAP2B
Available structures
PDB	Ortholog search: PDBe RCSB
PDB	List of PDB id codes 1N4P, 1N4Q, 1N4R, 1N4S
Enzyme activity
EC #	BRENDA	ExPASy	KEGG	MetaCyc
3.6.5.2	↗	↗	↗	↗

Gene location (Human)
Chr.	Chromosome 3 (human)
Band	3q25.2	Start	153,162,226 bp
Band	3q25.2	End	153,170,627 bp

Gene location (Mouse)
Chr.	Chromosome 3 (mouse)
Band	3|3 E1	Start	61,269,059 bp
Band	3|3 E1	End	61,275,851 bp
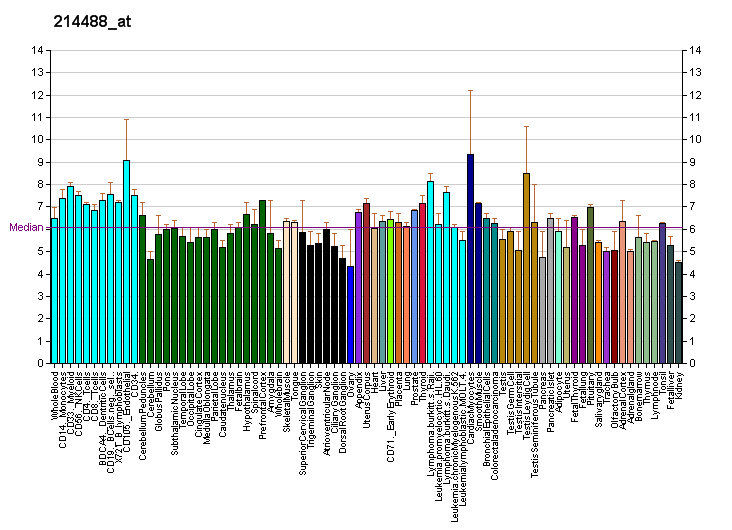

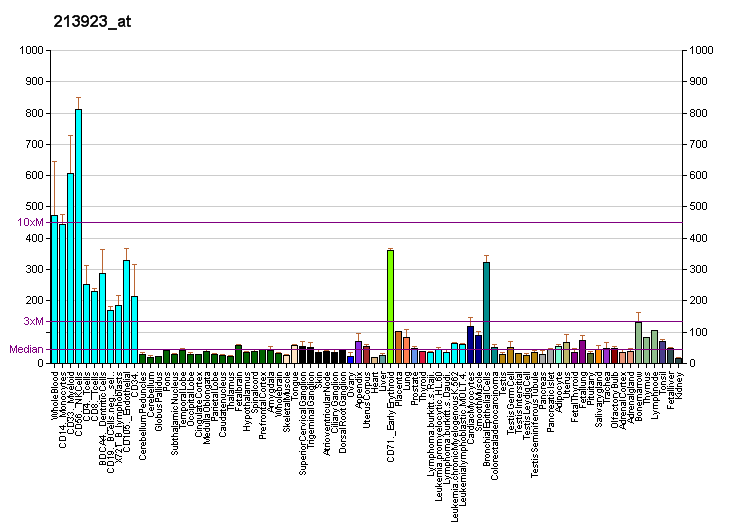
RNA expression pattern
Bgee	Human / Mouse (ortholog); Top expressed in: gingival epithelium; germinal epithelium; buccal mucosa cell; amniotic fluid; tendon of biceps brachii; mucosa of pharynx; hair follicle; human penis; palpebral conjunctiva; secondary oocyte / Top expressed in: aortic valve; cumulus cell; ascending aorta; epithelium of lens; lumbar subsegment of spinal cord; Rostral migratory stream; tibiofemoral joint; calvaria; external carotid artery; dorsal striatum; More reference expression data
BioGPS	More reference expression data
Gene ontology
Molecular function	nucleotide binding; protein domain specific binding; GDP binding; GTP binding; protein binding; GTPase activity
Cellular component	recycling endosome; cytosol; endosome; membrane; cell-cell contact zone; bicellular tight junction; recycling endosome membrane; membrane raft; extracellular exosome; plasma membrane; specific granule membrane; tertiary granule membrane
Biological process	regulation of protein tyrosine kinase activity; microvillus assembly; establishment of endothelial intestinal barrier; Rap protein signal transduction; platelet activation; negative regulation of cell migration; positive regulation of protein autophosphorylation; platelet aggregation; signal transduction; neutrophil degranulation
Sources:Amigo / QuickGO
Orthologs
Databases	NCBI: entry; OMA: entry
Species	Human	Mouse
Entrez	5912	74012
Ensembl	ENSG00000181467	ENSMUSG00000036894
UniProt	P61225	P61226
RefSeq (mRNA)	NM_002886	NM_028712
RefSeq (protein)	NP_002877	NP_082988
Location (UCSC)	Chr 3: 153.16 – 153.17 Mb	Chr 3: 61.27 – 61.28 Mb
PubMed search
- Wikidata
View/Edit Human	View/Edit Mouse

Ras-related protein Rap-2b is a protein that in humans is encoded by the RAP2B gene. RAP2B belongs to the Ras-related protein family.

This intronless gene belongs to a family of RAS-related genes. The proteins encoded by these genes share approximately 50% amino acid identity with the classical RAS proteins and have numerous structural features in common. The most striking difference between the RAP and RAS proteins resides in their 61st amino acid: glutamine in RAS is replaced by threonine in RAP proteins. Evidence suggests that this protein may be polyisoprenylated and palmitoylated.
