= Ras-related protein Rab-29 =

Protein found in humans

RAB29

Identifiers
- Aliases: RAB29, RAB7L, RAB7L1, member RAS oncogene family
- External IDs: OMIM: 603949; MGI: 2385107; GeneCards: RAB29
Enzyme activity
| EC # | BRENDA | ExPASy | KEGG | MetaCyc |
|---|---|---|---|---|
| 3.6.5.2 | ↗ | ↗ | ↗ | ↗ |

Gene location (Human)
| Chr. | Chromosome 1 (human) |
| Band | 1q32.1 | Start | 205,767,986 bp |
| Band | 1q32.1 | End | 205,775,482 bp |

Gene location (Mouse)
| Chr. | Chromosome 1 (mouse) |
| Band | 1|1 E4 | Start | 131,794,962 bp |
| Band | 1|1 E4 | End | 131,800,625 bp |
RNA expression pattern
| Bgee | Human / Mouse (ortholog); Top expressed in: kidney tubule; granulocyte; secondary oocyte; glomerulus; renal medulla; human kidney; parotid gland; metanephric glomerulus; lymph node; germinal epithelium / Top expressed in: interventricular septum; granulocyte; morula; mesenteric lymph nodes; endocardial cushion; right kidney; proximal tubule; atrioventricular valve; calvaria; spleen; More reference expression data |
| BioGPS | n/a |
Gene ontology
| Molecular function | nucleotide binding; GTP binding; protein binding; kinesin binding; GDP binding; dynein complex binding; GTPase activity |
| Cellular component | cytoplasm; membrane; melanosome; plasma membrane; vacuole; perinuclear region of cytoplasm; extracellular exosome; cytoskeleton; mitochondrion; Golgi apparatus; cis-Golgi network; cytosol; intracellular vesicle; recycling endosome; early endosome; trans-Golgi network; vesicle |
| Biological process | positive regulation of intracellular protein transport; cell differentiation; negative regulation of neuron projection development; Golgi organization; endoplasmic reticulum to Golgi vesicle-mediated transport; melanosome organization; protein transport; regulation of neuron death; synapse assembly; positive regulation of receptor recycling; retrograde transport, endosome to Golgi; T cell activation; positive regulation of T cell receptor signaling pathway; protein localization to ciliary membrane; mitochondrion organization; regulation of retrograde transport, endosome to Golgi; protein localization to membrane; vesicle-mediated transport; transport; intracellular protein transport; Rab protein signal transduction |
Sources:Amigo / QuickGO
Orthologs
| Databases | NCBI: entry; OMA: entry |
| Species | Human | Mouse |
| Entrez | 8934 | 226422 |
| Ensembl | ENSG00000117280 | ENSMUSG00000026433 |
| UniProt | O14966 | Q91YQ1 |
| RefSeq (mRNA) | NM_001135662; NM_001135663; NM_001135664; NM_003929 | NM_144875 |
| RefSeq (protein) | NP_001129134; NP_001129135; NP_001129136; NP_003920 | n/a |
| Location (UCSC) | Chr 1: 205.77 – 205.78 Mb | Chr 1: 131.79 – 131.8 Mb |
| PubMed search |
- Wikidata
| View/Edit Human | View/Edit Mouse |

Ras-related protein Rab-29 is a protein that in humans is encoded by the RAB29 gene (previously RAB7L1). Rab-29 is a small GTP-binding protein and is a member of the Ras superfamily.
