= RAB37 =

Protein-coding gene in the species Homo sapiens

Identifiers
- Aliases: RAB37, member RAS oncogene family
- External IDs: OMIM: 609956; MGI: 1929945; GeneCards: RAB37
Enzyme activity
EC #	BRENDA	ExPASy	KEGG	MetaCyc
3.6.5.2	↗	↗	↗	↗

Gene location (Human)
Chr.	Chromosome 17 (human)
Band	17q25.1	Start	74,670,578 bp
Band	17q25.1	End	74,747,335 bp

Gene location (Mouse)
Chr.	Chromosome 11 (mouse)
Band	11|11 E2	Start	114,982,257 bp
Band	11|11 E2	End	115,053,062 bp
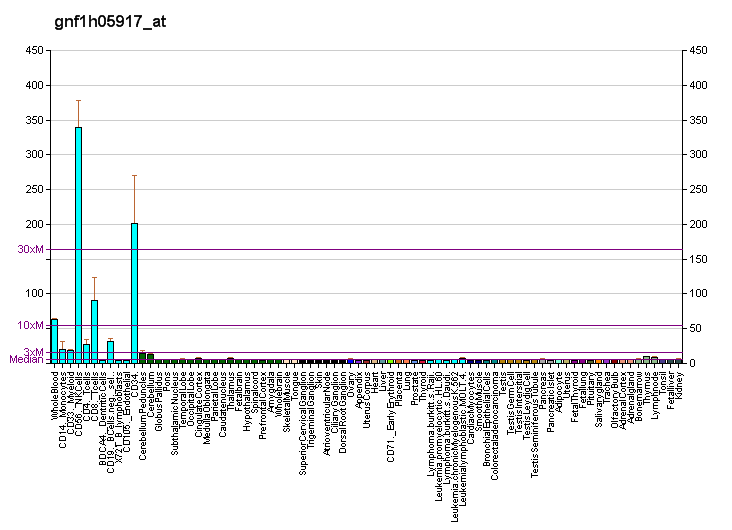
RNA expression pattern
Bgee	Human / Mouse (ortholog); Top expressed in: cerebellar hemisphere; right hemisphere of cerebellum; granulocyte; monocyte; blood; nasal epithelium; spleen; bone marrow cell; right lobe of liver; endothelial cell / Top expressed in: islet of Langerhans; granulocyte; lateral geniculate nucleus; anterior horn of spinal cord; medial dorsal nucleus; medial geniculate nucleus; retinal pigment epithelium; cerebellar cortex; facial motor nucleus; lumbar subsegment of spinal cord; More reference expression data
BioGPS	More reference expression data
Gene ontology
Molecular function	nucleotide binding; GTP binding; protein binding; GTPase activity
Cellular component	cytoplasmic vesicle; endoplasmic reticulum-Golgi intermediate compartment; azurophil granule membrane; specific granule membrane; endosome; plasma membrane; synaptic vesicle; secretory granule membrane; intracellular anatomical structure
Biological process	protein transport; neutrophil degranulation; vesicle docking involved in exocytosis; protein secretion; protein localization to plasma membrane; regulation of exocytosis; intracellular protein transport; Rab protein signal transduction; small GTPase mediated signal transduction
Sources:Amigo / QuickGO
Orthologs
Databases	NCBI: entry; OMA: entry
Species	Human	Mouse
Entrez	326624	58222
Ensembl	ENSG00000172794	ENSMUSG00000020732
UniProt	Q96AX2	Q9JKM7
RefSeq (mRNA)	NM_001006637; NM_001006638; NM_001163989; NM_001163990; NM_175738 NM_001330471	NM_001163753; NM_021411
RefSeq (protein)	NP_001006639; NP_001157461; NP_001157462; NP_001317400; NP_783865	NP_001157225; NP_067386
Location (UCSC)	Chr 17: 74.67 – 74.75 Mb	Chr 11: 114.98 – 115.05 Mb
PubMed search
- Wikidata
View/Edit Human	View/Edit Mouse

Ras-related protein Rab-37 is a protein that in humans is encoded by the RAB37 gene.

Rab proteins are low molecular mass GTPases that are critical regulators of vesicle trafficking. For additional background information on Rab proteins, see MIM 179508.[supplied by OMIM]
