= RAB40A =

Protein-coding gene in the species Homo sapiens

Identifiers
- Aliases: RAB40A, RAR2, RAR2A, member RAS oncogene family
- External IDs: GeneCards: RAB40A
Enzyme activity
EC #	BRENDA	ExPASy	KEGG	MetaCyc
3.6.5.2	↗	↗	↗	↗

Gene location (Human)
Chr.	X chromosome (human)
Band	Xq22.2	Start	103,499,130 bp
Band	Xq22.2	End	103,519,489 bp
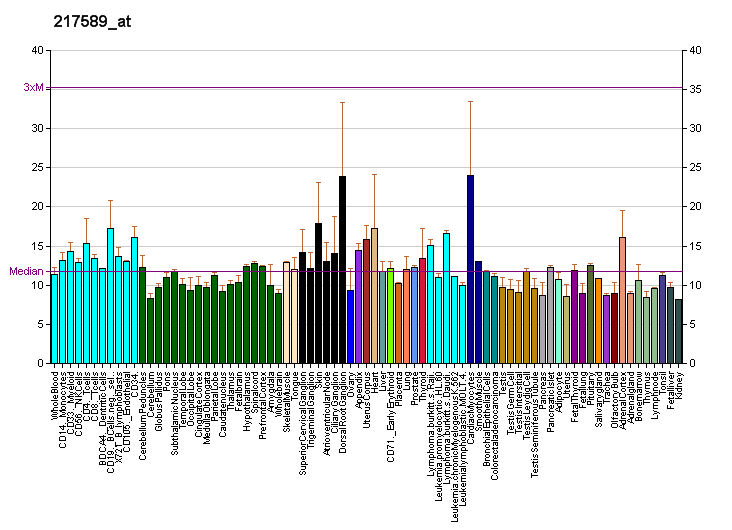

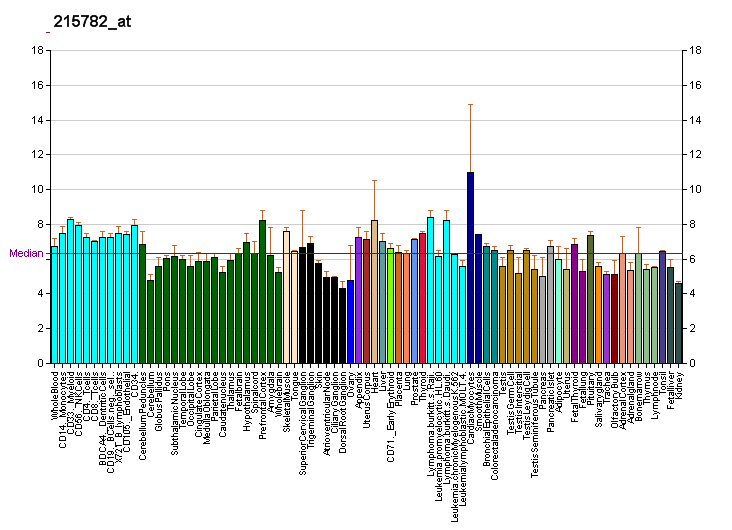
RNA expression pattern
Bgee	Human / Mouse (ortholog); Top expressed in: testicle; corpus epididymis; right ovary; left ovary; stromal cell of endometrium; body of uterus; left uterine tube; tail of epididymis; gastric mucosa; canal of the cervix / n/a; More reference expression data
BioGPS	More reference expression data
Gene ontology
Molecular function	nucleotide binding; GTP binding; GTPase activity
Cellular component	membrane; endosome; plasma membrane; synaptic vesicle; secretory granule membrane; Golgi membrane
Biological process	intracellular signal transduction; protein ubiquitination; vesicle docking involved in exocytosis; protein secretion; protein localization to plasma membrane; regulation of exocytosis; intracellular protein transport; Rab protein signal transduction
Sources:Amigo / QuickGO
Orthologs
Databases	NCBI: entry; OMA: entry
Species	Human	Mouse
Entrez	142684	n/a
Ensembl	ENSG00000172476	n/a
UniProt	Q8WXH6	n/a
RefSeq (mRNA)	NM_080879	n/a
RefSeq (protein)	NP_543155	n/a
Location (UCSC)	Chr X: 103.5 – 103.52 Mb	n/a
PubMed search		n/a
- Wikidata
View/Edit Human

Ras-related protein Rab-40A is a protein that in humans is encoded by the RAB40A gene.
