= Vacuolar protein sorting =

Vacuolar protein sorting proteins are involved in the intracellular sorting and delivery of soluble vacuolar proteins.
