= RAB36 =

Protein-coding gene in the species Homo sapiens

Identifiers
- Aliases: RAB36, member RAS oncogene family
- External IDs: OMIM: 605662; MGI: 1924127; GeneCards: RAB36
Enzyme activity
EC #	BRENDA	ExPASy	KEGG	MetaCyc
3.6.5.2	↗	↗	↗	↗

Gene location (Human)
Chr.	Chromosome 22 (human)
Band	22q11.23	Start	23,145,366 bp
Band	22q11.23	End	23,165,663 bp

Gene location (Mouse)
Chr.	Chromosome 10 (mouse)
Band	10|10 C1	Start	74,872,890 bp
Band	10|10 C1	End	74,890,580 bp
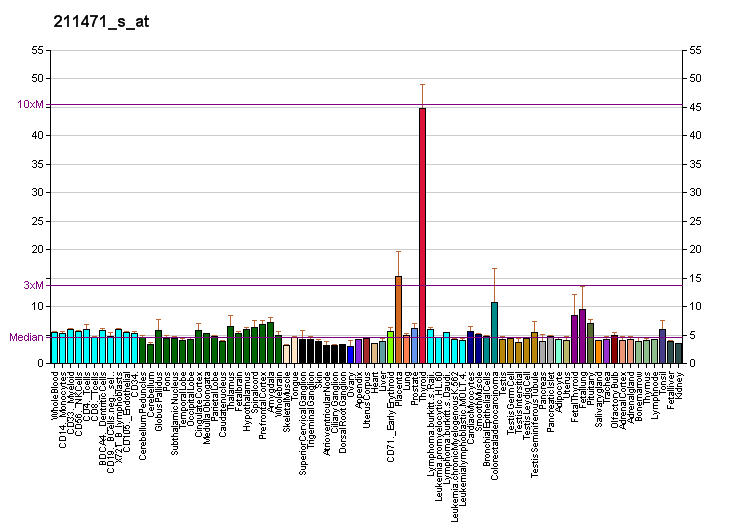
RNA expression pattern
Bgee	Human / Mouse (ortholog); Top expressed in: right uterine tube; epithelium of bronchus; bronchial epithelial cell; olfactory zone of nasal mucosa; secondary oocyte; pituitary gland; anterior pituitary; mucosa of paranasal sinus; right lobe of thyroid gland; left lobe of thyroid gland / Top expressed in: ventromedial nucleus; median eminence; arcuate nucleus; otolith organ; utricle; suprachiasmatic nucleus; olfactory epithelium; lumbar subsegment of spinal cord; primary visual cortex; nucleus accumbens; More reference expression data
BioGPS	More reference expression data
Gene ontology
Molecular function	nucleotide binding; GTP binding; GTPase activity
Cellular component	Golgi apparatus; membrane; Golgi membrane
Biological process	protein transport; intracellular protein transport; Rab protein signal transduction
Sources:Amigo / QuickGO
Orthologs
Databases	NCBI: entry; OMA: entry
Species	Human	Mouse
Entrez	9609	76877
Ensembl	ENSG00000100228	ENSMUSG00000020175
UniProt	O95755	Q8CAM5
RefSeq (mRNA)	NM_004914; NM_001349877; NM_001349878	NM_029781; NM_001359270; NM_001359271; NM_001359272
RefSeq (protein)	NP_004905; NP_001336806; NP_001336807	NP_001346199; NP_001346200; NP_001346201
Location (UCSC)	Chr 22: 23.15 – 23.17 Mb	Chr 10: 74.87 – 74.89 Mb
PubMed search
- Wikidata
View/Edit Human	View/Edit Mouse

Ras-related protein Rab-36 is a protein that in humans is encoded by the RAB36 gene.
