= RAB3D =

Protein-coding gene in the species Homo sapiens

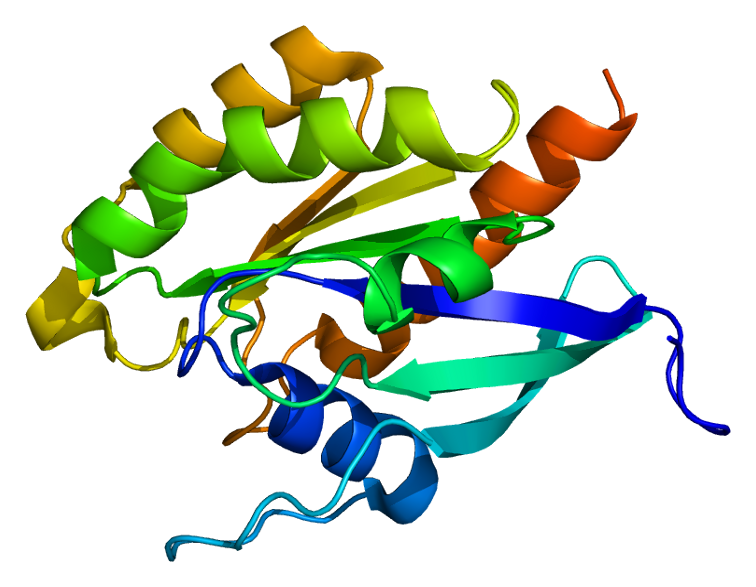

Identifiers
- Aliases: RAB3D, D2-2, GOV, RAB16, RAD3D, member RAS oncogene family
- External IDs: OMIM: 604350; MGI: 97844; GeneCards: RAB3D
Available structures
| PDB | Ortholog search: PDBe RCSB |
| PDB | List of PDB id codes 2GF9 |
Enzyme activity
| EC # | BRENDA | ExPASy | KEGG | MetaCyc |
|---|---|---|---|---|
| 3.6.5.2 | ↗ | ↗ | ↗ | ↗ |

Gene location (Human)
| Chr. | Chromosome 19 (human) |
| Band | 19p13.2 | Start | 11,322,068 bp |
| Band | 19p13.2 | End | 11,346,270 bp |

Gene location (Mouse)
| Chr. | Chromosome 9 (mouse) |
| Band | 9|9 A3 | Start | 21,818,787 bp |
| Band | 9|9 A3 | End | 21,829,488 bp |
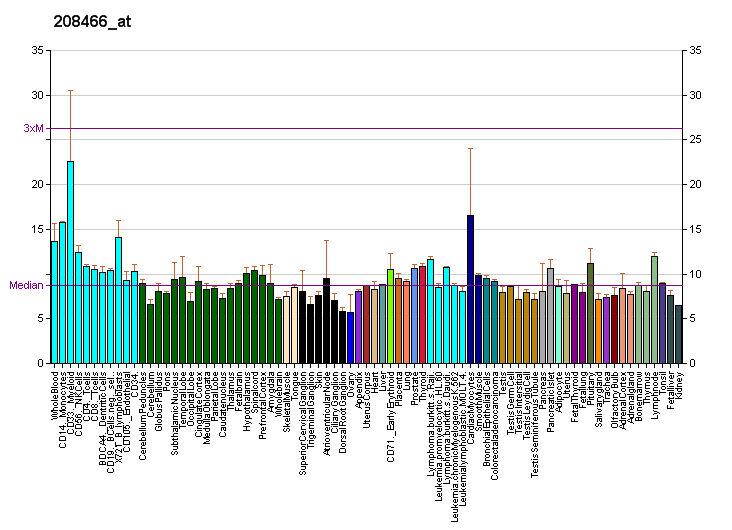
RNA expression pattern
| Bgee | Human / Mouse (ortholog); Top expressed in: parotid gland; spinal ganglia; human penis; nipple; skin of thigh; mucosa of pharynx; vulva; blood; cardia; trigeminal ganglion / Top expressed in: lacrimal gland; granulocyte; salivary gland; lumbar spinal ganglion; epithelium of stomach; corneal stroma; submandibular gland; pyloric antrum; parotid gland; conjunctival fornix; More reference expression data |
| BioGPS | More reference expression data |
Gene ontology
| Molecular function | nucleotide binding; GTP binding; myosin V binding; GTP-dependent protein binding; GTPase activity |
| Cellular component | zymogen granule; cytoplasmic microtubule; secretory vesicle; extracellular exosome; transport vesicle; mitochondrion; membrane; plasma membrane; azurophil granule membrane; endosome; synaptic vesicle; vesicle |
| Biological process | regulation of exocytosis; protein transport; peptidyl-cysteine methylation; bone resorption; positive regulation of regulated secretory pathway; exocytosis; neutrophil degranulation; transport; intracellular protein transport; vesicle docking involved in exocytosis; protein secretion; Rab protein signal transduction; protein localization to plasma membrane |
Sources:Amigo / QuickGO
Orthologs
| Databases | NCBI: entry; OMA: entry |
| Species | Human | Mouse |
| Entrez | 9545 | 19340 |
| Ensembl | ENSG00000105514 | ENSMUSG00000019066 |
| UniProt | O95716 | P35276 |
| RefSeq (mRNA) | NM_004283 | NM_031874; NM_001324531 |
| RefSeq (protein) | NP_004274 | NP_001311460; NP_114080 |
| Location (UCSC) | Chr 19: 11.32 – 11.35 Mb | Chr 9: 21.82 – 21.83 Mb |
| PubMed search |
- Wikidata
| View/Edit Human | View/Edit Mouse |

Ras-related protein Rab-3D is a protein that in humans is encoded by the RAB3D gene.
