= GEM (gene) =

Protein-coding gene in humans

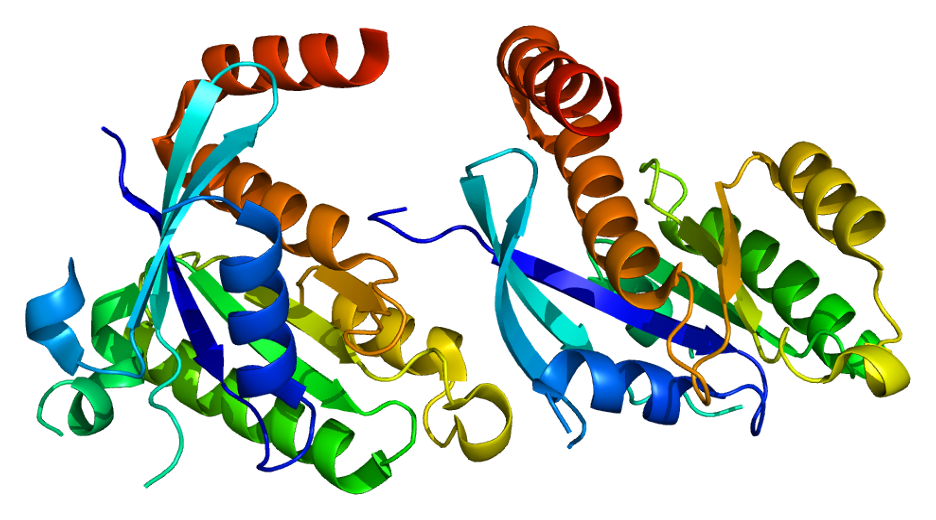

Identifiers
- Aliases: GEM, KIR, GTP binding protein overexpressed in skeletal muscle
- External IDs: OMIM: 600164; MGI: 99844; GeneCards: GEM
Available structures
PDB	Ortholog search: PDBe RCSB
PDB	List of PDB id codes 2CJW, 2G3Y, 2HT6

Gene location (Human)
Chr.	Chromosome 8 (human)
Band	8q22.1	Start	94,249,253 bp
Band	8q22.1	End	94,262,350 bp

Gene location (Mouse)
Chr.	Chromosome 4 (mouse)
Band	4 A1|4 5.34 cM	Start	11,704,457 bp
Band	4 A1|4 5.34 cM	End	11,714,752 bp
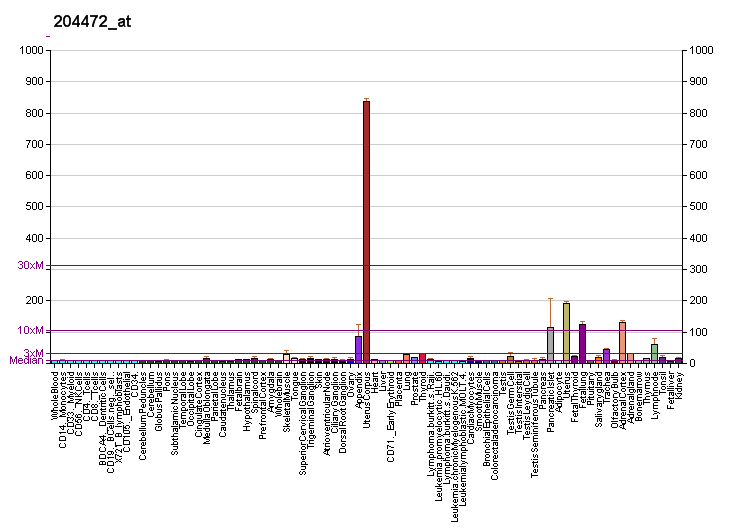
RNA expression pattern
Bgee	Human / Mouse (ortholog); Top expressed in: retinal pigment epithelium; gallbladder; tail of epididymis; vena cava; gastric mucosa; right coronary artery; ascending aorta; cartilage tissue; Descending thoracic aorta; mucosa of urinary bladder / Top expressed in: ascending aorta; cumulus cell; aortic valve; skin of external ear; pineal gland; neural layer of retina; adrenal gland; endocardial cushion; spermatocyte; atrioventricular valve; More reference expression data
BioGPS	More reference expression data
Gene ontology
Molecular function	nucleotide binding; GTP binding; protein binding; magnesium ion binding; calmodulin binding; GDP binding; GTPase activity; calcium channel regulator activity
Cellular component	spindle midzone; cytoplasmic side of plasma membrane; plasma membrane; midbody; mitotic spindle; nucleus; membrane
Biological process	cell surface receptor signaling pathway; metaphase plate congression; chromosome organization; immune response; signal transduction; mitotic cell cycle; negative regulation of high voltage-gated calcium channel activity
Sources:Amigo / QuickGO
Orthologs
Databases	NCBI: entry; OMA: entry
Species	Human	Mouse
Entrez	2669	14579
Ensembl	ENSG00000164949	ENSMUSG00000028214
UniProt	P55040	P55041
RefSeq (mRNA)	NM_181702; NM_005261	NM_010276
RefSeq (protein)	NP_005252; NP_859053	NP_034406
Location (UCSC)	Chr 8: 94.25 – 94.26 Mb	Chr 4: 11.7 – 11.71 Mb
PubMed search
- Wikidata
View/Edit Human	View/Edit Mouse

GTP-binding protein GEM is a protein that in humans is encoded by the GEM gene.

The protein encoded by this gene belongs to the RAD/GEM family of GTP-binding proteins. It is associated with the inner face of the plasma membrane and could play a role as a regulatory protein in receptor-mediated signal transduction. Alternative splicing occurs at this locus and two transcript variants encoding the same protein have been identified.
