= RAB15 =

Protein-coding gene in the species Homo sapiens

Identifiers
- Aliases: RAB15, member RAS oncogene family
- External IDs: MGI: 1916865; GeneCards: RAB15
Enzyme activity
EC #	BRENDA	ExPASy	KEGG	MetaCyc
3.6.5.2	↗	↗	↗	↗

Gene location (Human)
Chr.	Chromosome 14 (human)
Band	14q23.3	Start	64,945,814 bp
Band	14q23.3	End	64,973,226 bp

Gene location (Mouse)
Chr.	Chromosome 12 (mouse)
Band	12|12 C3	Start	76,844,734 bp
Band	12|12 C3	End	76,869,682 bp
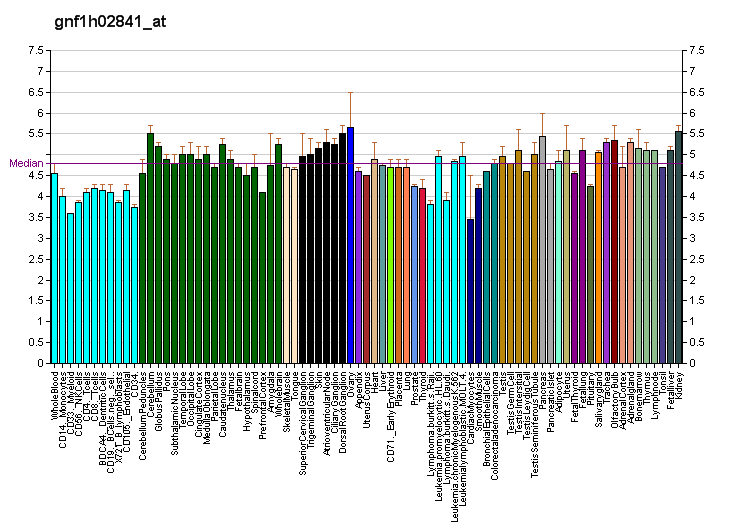

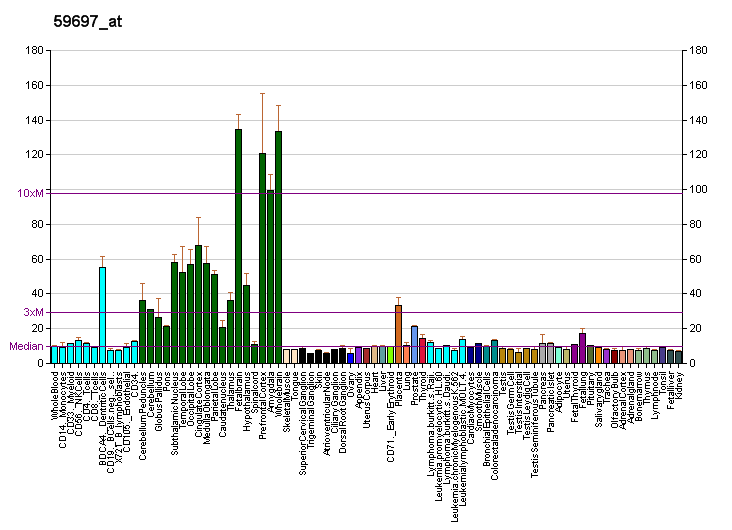

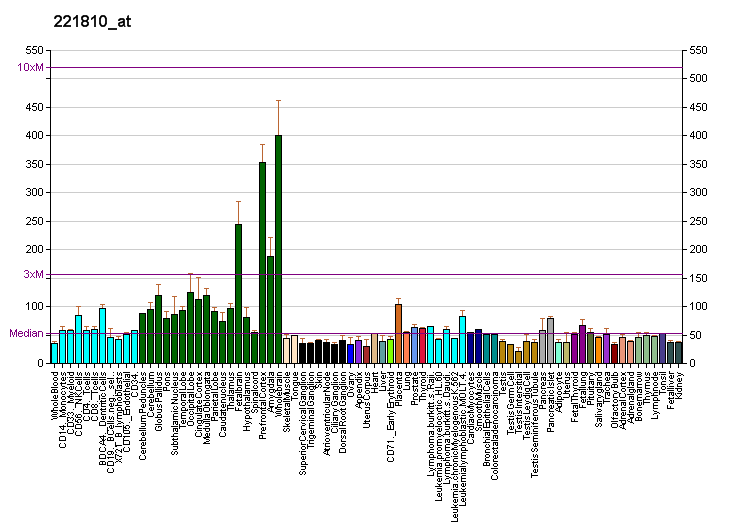
RNA expression pattern
Bgee	Human / Mouse (ortholog); Top expressed in: right hemisphere of cerebellum; right frontal lobe; prefrontal cortex; dorsolateral prefrontal cortex; Brodmann area 9; cingulate gyrus; anterior cingulate cortex; endothelial cell; parotid gland; primary visual cortex / Top expressed in: vestibular membrane of cochlear duct; transitional epithelium of urinary bladder; visual cortex; submandibular gland; primary visual cortex; dentate gyrus of hippocampal formation granule cell; superior frontal gyrus; lacrimal gland; olfactory tubercle; piriform cortex; More reference expression data
BioGPS	More reference expression data
Gene ontology
Molecular function	nucleotide binding; GTP binding; protein binding; GTPase activity
Cellular component	cytoplasm; perinuclear region of cytoplasm; plasma membrane; endosome membrane; extracellular exosome; membrane; cilium; endosome; synaptic vesicle
Biological process	protein transport; positive regulation of regulated secretory pathway; vesicle docking involved in exocytosis; protein secretion; transport; intracellular protein transport; regulation of exocytosis; Rab protein signal transduction; protein localization to plasma membrane
Sources:Amigo / QuickGO
Orthologs
Databases	NCBI: entry; OMA: entry
Species	Human	Mouse
Entrez	376267	104886
Ensembl	ENSG00000139998	ENSMUSG00000021062
UniProt	P59190	Q8K386
RefSeq (mRNA)	NM_001308154; NM_198686; NM_001330182	NM_134050; NM_001347405; NM_001347406; NM_001347407
RefSeq (protein)	NP_001295083; NP_001317111; NP_941959	n/a
Location (UCSC)	Chr 14: 64.95 – 64.97 Mb	Chr 12: 76.84 – 76.87 Mb
PubMed search
- Wikidata
View/Edit Human	View/Edit Mouse

Ras-related protein Rab-15 is a protein that in humans is encoded by the RAB15 gene.
