= RAB33A =

Protein-coding gene in the species Homo sapiens

Identifiers
- Aliases: RAB33A, RabS10, member RAS oncogene family
- External IDs: OMIM: 300333; MGI: 109493; GeneCards: RAB33A
Enzyme activity
| EC # | BRENDA | ExPASy | KEGG | MetaCyc |
|---|---|---|---|---|
| 3.6.5.2 | ↗ | ↗ | ↗ | ↗ |

Gene location (Human)
| Chr. | X chromosome (human) |
| Band | Xq26.1 | Start | 130,171,962 bp |
| Band | Xq26.1 | End | 130,184,870 bp |

Gene location (Mouse)
| Chr. | X chromosome (mouse) |
| Band | X 25.68 cM|X A5 | Start | 48,519,285 bp |
| Band | X 25.68 cM|X A5 | End | 48,530,232 bp |
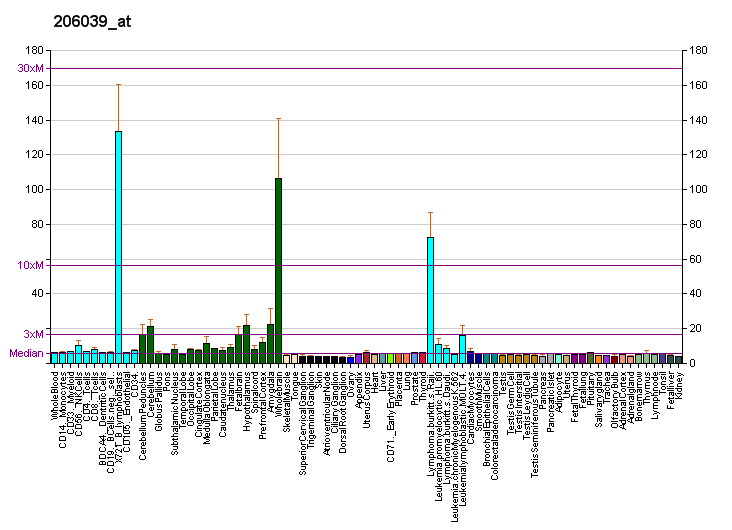
RNA expression pattern
| Bgee | Human / Mouse (ortholog); Top expressed in: C1 segment; prefrontal cortex; gonad; Brodmann area 9; middle frontal gyrus; ganglionic eminence; cerebellar hemisphere; right hemisphere of cerebellum; middle temporal gyrus; right frontal lobe / Top expressed in: superior cervical ganglion; barrel cortex; facial motor nucleus; medial geniculate nucleus; anterior horn of spinal cord; lateral geniculate nucleus; saccule; medial dorsal nucleus; ganglionic eminence; medial ganglionic eminence; More reference expression data |
| BioGPS | More reference expression data |
Gene ontology
| Molecular function | nucleotide binding; GTP binding; protein binding; GTPase activity |
| Cellular component | plasma membrane; membrane; Golgi membrane; endoplasmic reticulum membrane |
| Biological process | regulation of autophagosome assembly; antigen processing and presentation; intracellular protein transport; endoplasmic reticulum to Golgi vesicle-mediated transport; Rab protein signal transduction |
Sources:Amigo / QuickGO
Orthologs
| Databases | NCBI: entry; OMA: entry |
| Species | Human | Mouse |
| Entrez | 9363 | 19337 |
| Ensembl | ENSG00000134594 | ENSMUSG00000031104 |
| UniProt | Q14088 | P97950 |
| RefSeq (mRNA) | NM_004794 | NM_011228 |
| RefSeq (protein) | NP_004785 | NP_035358 |
| Location (UCSC) | Chr X: 130.17 – 130.18 Mb | Chr X: 48.52 – 48.53 Mb |
| PubMed search |
- Wikidata
| View/Edit Human | View/Edit Mouse |

Ras-related protein Rab-33A is a protein that in humans is encoded by the RAB33A gene.

The protein encoded by this gene belongs to the small GTPase superfamily, Rab family. It is GTP-binding protein and may be involved in vesicle transport.
