= Rap GTP-binding protein =

Type of small GTPase

RAP1A, member of RAS oncogene family

Identifiers
- Symbol: RAP1A
- NCBI gene: 5906
- HGNC: 9855
- OMIM: 179520
- RefSeq: NM_002884
- UniProt: P62834

Other data
- Locus: Chr. 1 p13.3
Search for
- Structures: Swiss-model
- Domains: InterPro

RAP1B, member of RAS oncogene family

Identifiers
- Symbol: RAP1B
- NCBI gene: 5908
- HGNC: 9857
- OMIM: 179530
- RefSeq: NM_015646
- UniProt: P61224

Other data
- Locus: Chr. 12 q14
Search for
- Structures: Swiss-model
- Domains: InterPro

Rap GTP-binding protein also known as Ras-related proteins or simply RAP is a type of small GTPase, similar in structure to Ras.

These proteins share approximately 50% amino acid identity with the classical RAS proteins and have numerous structural features in common. The most striking difference between RAP proteins and RAS proteins resides in their 61st amino acid: glutamine in RAS is replaced by threonine in RAP proteins. RAP counteracts the mitogenic function of RAS because it can interact with RAS GAPs and RAF in a competitive manner.

== Family members ==
Human genes that encode Ras-related proteins include:

- RAP1A, RAP1B
- RAP2A, RAP2B, RAP2C
- RAB5C
