= RAP1B =

Protein-coding gene in the species Homo sapiens

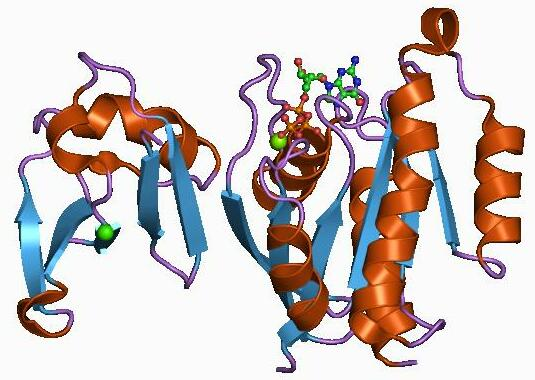

Identifiers
- Aliases: RAP1B, K-REV, RAL1B, member of RAS oncogene family
- External IDs: OMIM: 179530; MGI: 894315; GeneCards: RAP1B
Available structures
PDB	Ortholog search: PDBe RCSB
PDB	List of PDB id codes 3BRW, 3CF6, 4DXA, 4HDO, 4HDQ, 4M8N, 4MGI, 4MGK, 4MGY, 4MGZ, 4MH0
Enzyme activity
EC #	BRENDA	ExPASy	KEGG	MetaCyc
3.6.5.2	↗	↗	↗	↗

Gene location (Human)
Chr.	Chromosome 12 (human)
Band	12q15	Start	68,610,855 bp
Band	12q15	End	68,671,901 bp

Gene location (Mouse)
Chr.	Chromosome 10 (mouse)
Band	10|10 D2	Start	117,649,776 bp
Band	10|10 D2	End	117,681,940 bp
RNA expression pattern
Bgee	Human / Mouse (ortholog); Top expressed in: monocyte; Achilles tendon; lymph node; granulocyte; appendix; endometrium; smooth muscle tissue; gonad; tibial arteries; bone marrow / Top expressed in: left lung lobe; blood; decidua; stroma of bone marrow; right lung lobe; endocardial cushion; ureter; dermis; gastrula; endothelial cell of lymphatic vessel; More reference expression data
BioGPS	n/a
Gene ontology
Molecular function	nucleotide binding; GDP binding; protein-containing complex binding; GTP binding; protein binding; GTPase activity
Cellular component	cytoplasm; cytosol; membrane; cell-cell junction; plasma membrane; lipid droplet; intracellular anatomical structure; cell junction; membrane raft; extracellular exosome; azurophil granule membrane
Biological process	establishment of endothelial barrier; microvillus assembly; regulation of cell junction assembly; Rap protein signal transduction; regulation of establishment of cell polarity; cellular response to cAMP; signal transduction; neutrophil degranulation; interleukin-12-mediated signaling pathway; small GTPase mediated signal transduction; cell population proliferation; response to carbohydrate; negative regulation of calcium ion-dependent exocytosis; positive regulation of ERK1 and ERK2 cascade; cellular response to organic cyclic compound; cellular response to gonadotropin-releasing hormone; negative regulation of synaptic vesicle exocytosis
Sources:Amigo / QuickGO
Orthologs
Databases	NCBI: entry; OMA: entry
Species	Human	Mouse
Entrez	5908	215449
Ensembl	ENSG00000127314	ENSMUSG00000052681
UniProt	P61224	Q99JI6
RefSeq (mRNA)	NM_015646; NM_001010942; NM_001251917; NM_001251918; NM_001251921 NM_001251922	NM_024457
RefSeq (protein)	NP_001010942; NP_001238846; NP_001238847; NP_001238850; NP_001238851 NP_056461; NP_001010942.1; NP_056461.1	NP_077777
Location (UCSC)	Chr 12: 68.61 – 68.67 Mb	Chr 10: 117.65 – 117.68 Mb
PubMed search
- Wikidata
View/Edit Human	View/Edit Mouse

Ras-related protein Rap-1b, also known as GTP-binding protein smg p21B, is a protein that in humans is encoded by the RAP1B gene.
