= TBC domain =

Protein domain

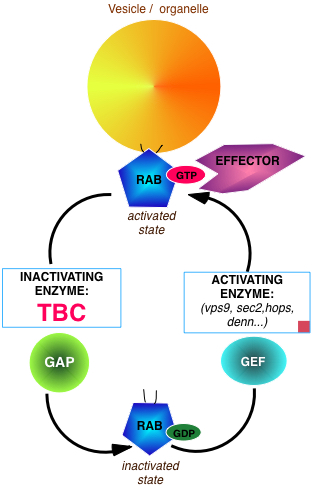
The Rab cycle in membrane trafficking: The cycle between the GTP-bound inactive state and the GTP- bound active state is led by the Rab protein and regulated by an activating enzyme GEF and an inactivating enzyme GAP which in this case could be the TBC protein. Hereafter, the activated form of Rab, GTP-bound, is incorporated to a specific organelle or vesicle and promotes its transport by interacting with a specific effector molecule. GTPase-activating proteins (GAPs) limit the duration of the active state and accelerate the slow intrinsic rate of GTP hydrolysis.

The TBC domain is an evolutionarily conserved protein domain found in all eukaryotes. It is approximately 180 to 200 amino acids long. The domain is named for its initial discovery in the proteins Tre-2, Bub2, and Cdc16.

TBC family members act as GTPase-activating proteins (GAPs) for small GTPases in regulating the cell cycle. For example, Rab activity is modulated in part by GAPs, and many RabGAPs share a Tre2/Bub2/Cdc16(TBC)-domain architecture, suggesting that TBC domain-containing proteins may behave similarly.

== Examples ==
USP6 and CDC16 contain TBC domains. In addition, all proteins in the TBC family contain this domain:

- TBC1D1 (Bub2)
- TBC1D2
- TBC1D2B
- TBC1D3
- TBC1D3B
- TBC1D3C
- TBC1D3D
- TBC1D3E
- TBC1D3F
- TBC1D3G
- TBC1D3H
- TBC1D3I
- TBC1D3K
- TBC1D3L
- TBC1D4
- TBC1D5
- TBC1D7
- TBC1D8
- TBC1D8B
- TBC1D9
- TBC1D9B
- TBC1D10A
- TBC1D10B
- TBC1D10C
- TBC1D12
- TBC1D13
- TBC1D14
- TBC1D15
- TBC1D16
- TBC1D17
- TBC1D19
- TBC1D20
- TBC1D21
- TBC1D22A
- TBC1D22B
- TBC1D23
- TBC1D24
- TBC1D25
- TBC1D26
- TBC1D28
- TBC1D30
- TBC1D31
- TBC1D32

== Functions ==
TBC mainly functions as a specific Rab GAP (GTPases activating proteins) by being used as tools to inactivate specific membrane trafficking events. GAPs serve to increase GTPase activity by contributing the residues to the active site and promoting conversion from GTP to GDP form. Such activity of TBC proteins does not always require a close physical interaction although few TBC proteins have shown clear GAP activity towards their binding Rabs. Rab families contribute to defining organelles and controlling specificity and rate of transport through individual pathways. Therefore, TBC Rab-GAPS are essential regulators of intracellular and membrane transports as well as central participants in signal transduction. Nevertheless, not all TBC may have a primary role as a Rab-GAP and conversely, not all Rab-GAP contain TBC. In addition, the fact that this family has been poorly studied makes it then further complicated.

== Evolution and research ==
Phylogenetic analysis has provided insight into the evolution of the TBC family. ScrollSaw was implemented as a recent strategy to overcome poor resolution between TBC genes found in standard phylogenetic strategies during initial reconstructions. Significantly, the TBC domain is nearly always smaller than the Rab cohort in any individual genome, suggesting Rab/TBC coevolution. Twenty-one putative TBC sub-classes were founded and identified as a seven robust and two moderately supported clades.

Moreover, there has also been systematic analysis in order to identify the target Rabs of TBC proteins. It was, at first, based on the physical interaction between the TBC domain and its substrate Rab. For instance Barr and his coworkers found a specific interaction between RUTBC3/RabGAP-5 and Rab5A that activates the GTPase activity of Rab5 isoform. Similarly other research has shown that, among other important aspects, the TBC-Rab interaction alone is insufficient to determine the target of TBC proteins. However, there has been a second approach to identifying the target Rabs of TBC by investigating their in vitro GAP activity. Yet there has been similar discrepancies between this findings of different investigators which can be found in literature and may be attributable to differences between methods of in vitro. In addition, research has shown that TBC proteins are associated with some human diseases. For example, a dysfunction of TBC1D1 and TBC1D4 directly affects insulin actions and glucose uptake. Causing overweight or leanness due to the fact that this two family members of TBC regulate insulin-stimulated GLUT4 translocation to the plasma membrane in mammals. Furthermore, many of them have been shown to be associated with cancer, but the exact mechanism by which they are associated with this illness remains largely unknown. Therefore, there’s still much research needed to be done on this biological topic.
