= TBC1D24 =

Protein-coding gene in the species Homo sapiens

Identifiers
- Aliases: TBC1D24, DFNA65, DFNB86, DOORS, EIEE16, FIME, TLDC6, TBC1 domain family member 24, EPRPDC, DEE16
- External IDs: OMIM: 613577; MGI: 2443456; GeneCards: TBC1D24

Gene location (Human)
Chr.	Chromosome 16 (human)
Band	16p13.3	Start	2,475,051 bp
Band	16p13.3	End	2,509,560 bp

Gene location (Mouse)
Chr.	Chromosome 17 (mouse)
Band	17|17 A3.3	Start	24,394,405 bp
Band	17|17 A3.3	End	24,424,536 bp
RNA expression pattern
Bgee	Human / Mouse (ortholog); Top expressed in: parotid gland; Brodmann area 23; middle temporal gyrus; corpus epididymis; cerebellar vermis; renal medulla; superior frontal gyrus; entorhinal cortex; Brodmann area 46; cerebellar hemisphere / Top expressed in: retinal pigment epithelium; barrel cortex; ciliary body; substantia nigra; iris; prefrontal cortex; neural layer of retina; nucleus accumbens; suprachiasmatic nucleus; temporal lobe; More reference expression data
BioGPS	n/a
Gene ontology
Molecular function	protein binding; GTPase activator activity
Cellular component	cytoplasm; terminal bouton; neuromuscular junction; plasma membrane; cell junction; membrane; cytoplasmic vesicle membrane; cytoplasmic vesicle
Biological process	regulation of cilium assembly; positive regulation of GTPase activity; neuron projection development
Sources:Amigo / QuickGO
Orthologs
Databases	NCBI: entry; OMA: entry
Species	Human	Mouse
Entrez	57465	224617
Ensembl	ENSG00000162065	ENSMUSG00000036473
UniProt	Q9ULP9	Q3UUG6
RefSeq (mRNA)	NM_020705; NM_001199107	NM_001163847; NM_001163848; NM_001163849; NM_001163850; NM_001163851 NM_001163852; NM_001163853; NM_173186
RefSeq (protein)	NP_001186036; NP_065756	NP_001157319; NP_001157320; NP_001157321; NP_001157322; NP_001157323 NP_001157324; NP_001157325; NP_775278
Location (UCSC)	Chr 16: 2.48 – 2.51 Mb	Chr 17: 24.39 – 24.42 Mb
PubMed search
- Wikidata
View/Edit Human	View/Edit Mouse

TBC1 domain family, member 24 is a protein that in humans is encoded by the TBC1D24 gene.

== Function ==
This gene encodes a protein with a conserved domain, the TBC domain, characteristic of proteins which interact with GTPases. TBC domain proteins may serve as GTPase-activating proteins for a particular group of GTPases, the Rab (Ras-related proteins in brain) small GTPases which are involved in the regulation of membrane trafficking. Mutations in this gene are associated with familial infantile myoclonic epilepsy. Alternative splicing results in multiple transcript variants.

Mutations in TBC1D24 cause Hereditary hearing loss.
