= TBC1D4 =

Protein-coding gene in the species Homo sapiens

Identifiers
- Aliases: TBC1D4, AS160, NIDDM5, TBC1 domain family member 4
- External IDs: OMIM: 612465; MGI: 2429660; GeneCards: TBC1D4
Available structures
PDB	Ortholog search: PDBe RCSB
PDB	List of PDB id codes 3QYB

Gene location (Human)
Chr.	Chromosome 13 (human)
Band	13q22.2	Start	75,283,503 bp
Band	13q22.2	End	75,482,169 bp

Gene location (Mouse)
Chr.	Chromosome 14 (mouse)
Band	14|14 E2.3	Start	101,679,796 bp
Band	14|14 E2.3	End	101,846,627 bp
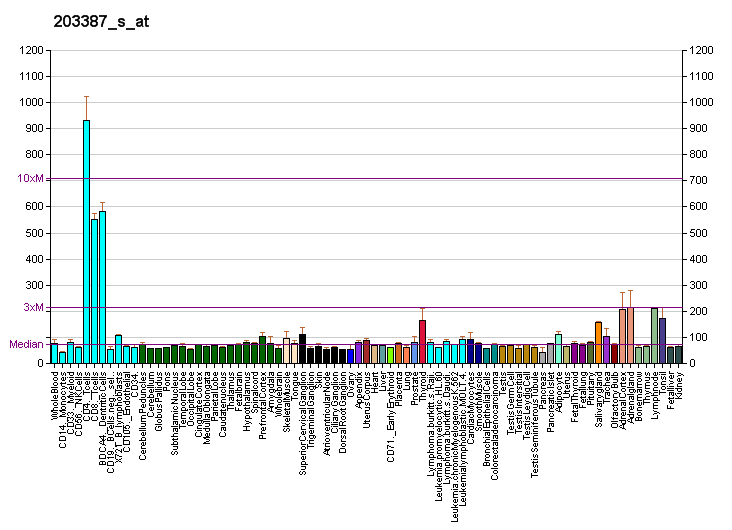

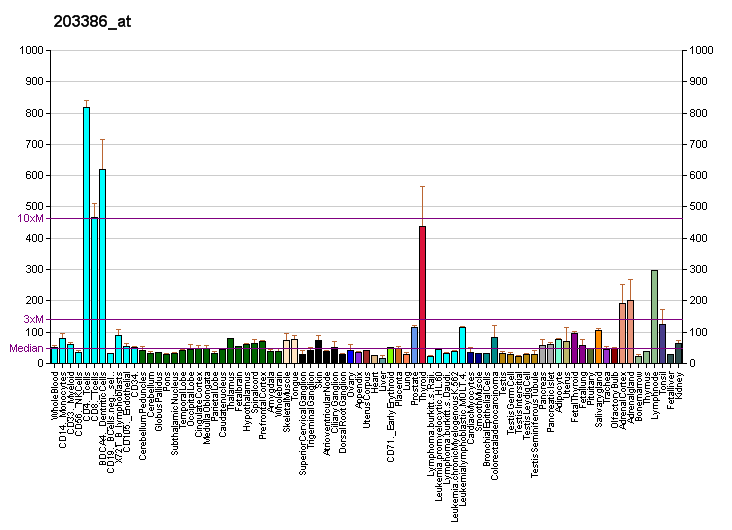
RNA expression pattern
Bgee	Human / Mouse (ortholog); Top expressed in: Skeletal muscle tissue of rectus abdominis; renal medulla; thoracic diaphragm; vastus lateralis muscle; parotid gland; Skeletal muscle tissue of biceps brachii; caput epididymis; corpus epididymis; right adrenal cortex; left adrenal gland / Top expressed in: temporal muscle; sternocleidomastoid muscle; digastric muscle; interventricular septum; extraocular muscle; parotid gland; lymph node; mesenteric lymph nodes; intercostal muscle; cerebellar vermis; More reference expression data
BioGPS	More reference expression data
Gene ontology
Molecular function	GTPase activator activity
Cellular component	endomembrane system; intracellular anatomical structure; cytoplasm; cytosol; vesicle
Biological process	vesicle-mediated transport; negative regulation of vesicle fusion; cellular response to insulin stimulus; regulation of vesicle fusion; activation of GTPase activity; intracellular protein transport
Sources:Amigo / QuickGO
Orthologs
Databases	NCBI: entry; OMA: entry
Species	Human	Mouse
Entrez	9882	210789
Ensembl	ENSG00000136111	ENSMUSG00000033083
UniProt	O60343	Q8BYJ6
RefSeq (mRNA)	NM_001286658; NM_001286659; NM_014832	NM_001081278; NM_173380
RefSeq (protein)	NP_001273587; NP_001273588; NP_055647	NP_001074747; NP_001391600; NP_001391601; NP_001391602; NP_001391603
Location (UCSC)	Chr 13: 75.28 – 75.48 Mb	Chr 14: 101.68 – 101.85 Mb
PubMed search
- Wikidata
View/Edit Human	View/Edit Mouse

AS160 (Akt substrate of 160 kDa), which was originally known as TBC1 domain family member 4 (TBC1D4), is a Rab GTPase-activating protein that in humans is encoded by the TBC1D4 gene.

The 160 kD protein product was first discovered in a screen for novel substrates of the serine-threonine kinase Akt2, which phosphorylates AS160 at Thr-642 and Ser-588 after insulin stimulation. Insulin stimulation of fat and muscle cells results in translocation of the glucose transporter GLUT4 to the plasma membrane, and this translocation process is dependent on phosphorylation of AS160. The role of AS160 in GLUT4 translocation is mediated by its GTPase activating domain and interactions with Rab proteins in vesicle formation, increasing GLUT4 translocation when its GTPase activity is inhibited by Akt phosphorylation. Specifically, this inhibition activates RAB2A, RAB8A, RAB10 and RAB14.

AS160 also contains a calmodulin-binding domain, and this domain mediates phosphorylation-independent glucose uptake in muscle cells.

== Isoforms ==
The TBC1D4 gene has two isoforms - a long isoform expressed almost exclusively in skeletal and cardiac muscle, and a short isoform with more widespread expression.

== Pathogenic mutations ==
A nonsense p.Arg684Ter variant in the TBC1D4 gene has been identified in the Greenlandic Inuit population that is associated with increased risk of type II diabetes. The variant mainly affects individuals with two copies of the mutation, indicating recessive inheritance. Although the mutation does not effect the short isoform of the protein, it introduces a premature stop codon in the long isoform, resulting in the absence of the long isoform protein in muscle tissue.

Homozygous carriers of the p.Arg684Ter allele have lower concentrations of fasting plasma glucose and insulin. They also have a markedly increased risk of Type II Diabetes — individuals with two mutant genes have about 10 times the chance of contracting Type II diabetes (odds ratio = 10.3) compared to noncarriers. Approximately 3.8% of Greenlanders are homozygous for the mutation, which is estimated to be responsible for approximately 10% of Type II Diabetes cases in Greenland.
