= TBC1D3 =

Protein-coding gene in the species Homo sapiens

Identifiers
- Aliases: TBC1D3, PRC17, TBC1D3A, TBC1D3F, TBC1 domain family member 3, TBC1D3L, TBC1D3D, TBC1D3C
- External IDs: OMIM: 607741; GeneCards: TBC1D3

Gene location (Human)
| Chr. | Chromosome 17 (human) |
| Band | 17q12 | Start | 38,181,659 bp |
| Band | 17q12 | End | 38,192,555 bp |
RNA expression pattern
| Bgee | Human / Mouse (ortholog); Top expressed in: gastric mucosa; testicle; sural nerve; epithelium of colon; fundus; granulocyte; left testis; right adrenal cortex; skeletal muscle tissue; bone marrow cell / n/a; More reference expression data |
| BioGPS | n/a |
Gene ontology
| Molecular function | GTPase activator activity |
| Cellular component | membrane; plasma membrane; endomembrane system; intracellular anatomical structure; early endosome membrane |
| Biological process | activation of GTPase activity; regulation of vesicle fusion; intracellular protein transport; regulation of cilium assembly |
Sources:Amigo / QuickGO
Orthologs
| Databases | NCBI: entry; OMA: entry |
| Species | Human | Mouse |
| Entrez | 729873 | n/a |
| Ensembl | ENSG00000274611 | n/a |
| UniProt | Q6IPX1; Q8IZP1 | n/a |
| RefSeq (mRNA) | NM_001123391 | n/a |
| RefSeq (protein) | NP_001116863; NP_001001418; NP_001116863 | n/a |
| Location (UCSC) | Chr 17: 38.18 – 38.19 Mb | n/a |
| PubMed search | | n/a |
- Wikidata
| View/Edit Human |

TBC1 domain family member 3 is a protein that in humans is encoded by the TBC1D3 gene. This protein contains a TBC (Tre-2, Bub2p, and Cdc16p) domain, which is found in proteins involved in Rab GTPase signaling and vesicle trafficking.

In humans, the NPEPPS-TBC1D3 fusion (transcriptional readthrough) transcripts are the predominant TBC1D3 isoforms.
