= GLUT4 =

Transport protein

glucose transporter, type 4

Identifiers
- Aliases: SLC2A4, Glc_transpt_4, IPR002441, GLUT4, Gtr4, Glut-4, Insulin-responsive facilitative glucose transporter, solute carrier family 2 member 4
- External IDs: OMIM: 138190; MGI: 95758; GeneCards: SLC2A4

Gene location (Human)
Chr.	Chromosome 17 (human)
Band	17p13.1	Start	7,281,718 bp
Band	17p13.1	End	7,288,257 bp

Gene location (Mouse)
Chr.	Chromosome 11 (mouse)
Band	11 B3|11 42.93 cM	Start	69,833,365 bp
Band	11 B3|11 42.93 cM	End	69,839,014 bp
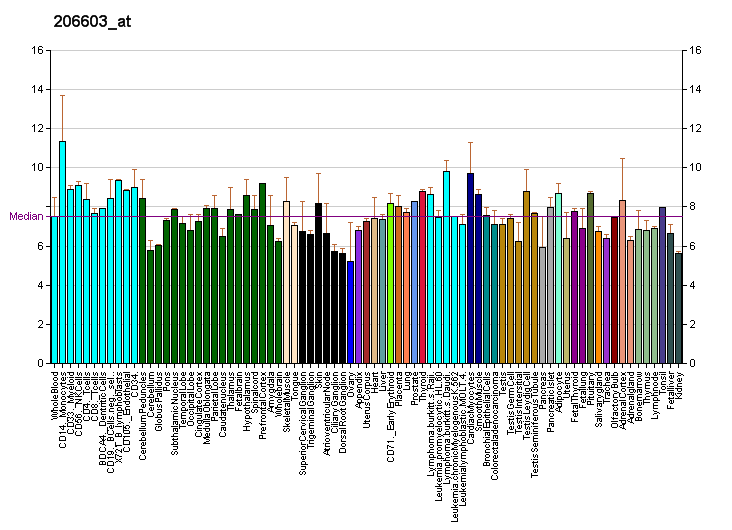
RNA expression pattern
Bgee	Human / Mouse (ortholog); Top expressed in: gastrocnemius muscle; muscle of thigh; skeletal muscle tissue; apex of heart; left ventricle; right auricle of heart; muscle layer of sigmoid colon; gastric mucosa; urinary bladder; fundus / Top expressed in: muscle of thigh; extensor digitorum longus muscle; digastric muscle; triceps brachii muscle; sternocleidomastoid muscle; temporal muscle; right ventricle; plantaris muscle; masseter muscle; tibialis anterior muscle; More reference expression data
BioGPS	More reference expression data
Gene ontology
Molecular function	transmembrane transporter activity; transporter activity; protein binding; D-glucose transmembrane transporter activity; glucose transmembrane transporter activity
Cellular component	cytoplasm; integral component of membrane; multivesicular body; vesicle; cytosol; endosome; membrane; intracellular membrane-bounded organelle; vesicle membrane; T-tubule; insulin-responsive compartment; plasma membrane; integral component of plasma membrane; cell surface; perinuclear region of cytoplasm; membrane raft; sarcolemma; clathrin-coated pit; trans-Golgi network transport vesicle; extracellular exosome; cytoplasmic vesicle membrane; external side of plasma membrane; endomembrane system; clathrin-coated vesicle; presynapse; sarcoplasmic reticulum
Biological process	glucose homeostasis; cellular response to osmotic stress; brown fat cell differentiation; cellular response to insulin stimulus; amylopectin biosynthetic process; response to ethanol; cellular response to hypoxia; carbohydrate transport; transmembrane transport; glucose import in response to insulin stimulus; cellular response to tumor necrosis factor; glucose import; carbohydrate metabolic process; glucose transmembrane transport; regulation of synaptic vesicle budding from presynaptic endocytic zone membrane
Sources:Amigo / QuickGO
Orthologs
Databases	NCBI: entry; OMA: entry
Species	Human	Mouse
Entrez	6517	20528
Ensembl	ENSG00000181856; ENSG00000288174	ENSMUSG00000018566
UniProt	P14672	P14142
RefSeq (mRNA)	NM_001042	NM_009204; NM_001359114
RefSeq (protein)	NP_001033	NP_033230; NP_001346043
Location (UCSC)	Chr 17: 7.28 – 7.29 Mb	Chr 11: 69.83 – 69.84 Mb
PubMed search
- Wikidata
View/Edit Human	View/Edit Mouse

Glucose transporter type 4 (GLUT4), also known as solute carrier family 2, facilitated glucose transporter member 4, is a protein encoded, in humans, by the SLC2A4 gene. GLUT4 is the insulin-regulated glucose transporter found primarily in adipose tissues and striated muscle (skeletal and cardiac). GLUT4 is distinctive because it is predominantly stored within intracellular vesicles, highlighting the importance of its trafficking and regulation as a central area of research. The first evidence for this glucose transport protein was provided by David James in 1988. The gene that encodes GLUT4 was cloned and mapped in 1989.

At the cell surface, GLUT4 permits the facilitated diffusion of circulating glucose down its concentration gradient into muscle and fat cells. Once within cells, glucose is rapidly phosphorylated by glucokinase in the liver and hexokinase in other tissues to form glucose-6-phosphate, which then enters glycolysis or is polymerized into glycogen. Glucose-6-phosphate cannot diffuse back out of cells, which also serves to maintain the concentration gradient for glucose to passively enter cells.

== Structure ==
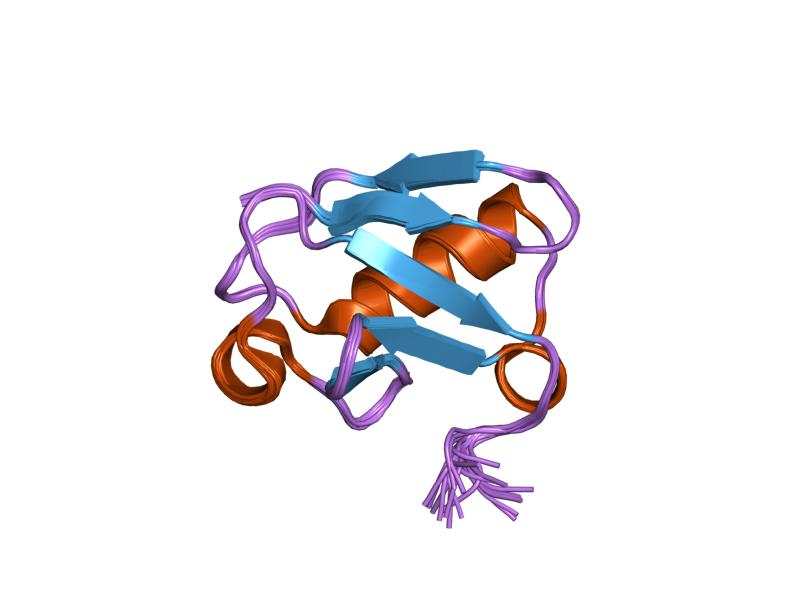
GLUT4 also contains a UBX-domain. These are ubiquitin-regulatory regions that can assist with cell signaling.

Like all proteins, the unique amino acid arrangement in the primary sequence of GLUT4 is what allows it to transport glucose across the plasma membrane. In addition to the phenylalanine on the N-terminus, two Leucine residues and acidic motifs on the COOH-terminus are believed to play a key role in the kinetics of endocytosis and exocytosis.

=== Other GLUT proteins ===
There are 14 total GLUT proteins separated into 3 classes based on sequence similarities. Class 1 consists of GLUT 1-4 and 14, class 2 contains GLUT 5, 7, 9 and 11, and class 3 has GLUT 6, 8, 10, 12 and 13.

Although there are some sequence differences between all GLUT proteins, they all have some basic structural components. For example, both the N and C termini in GLUT proteins are exposed to the cytoplasm of the cell, and they all have 12 transmembrane segments.

== Tissue distribution ==
=== Skeletal muscle ===
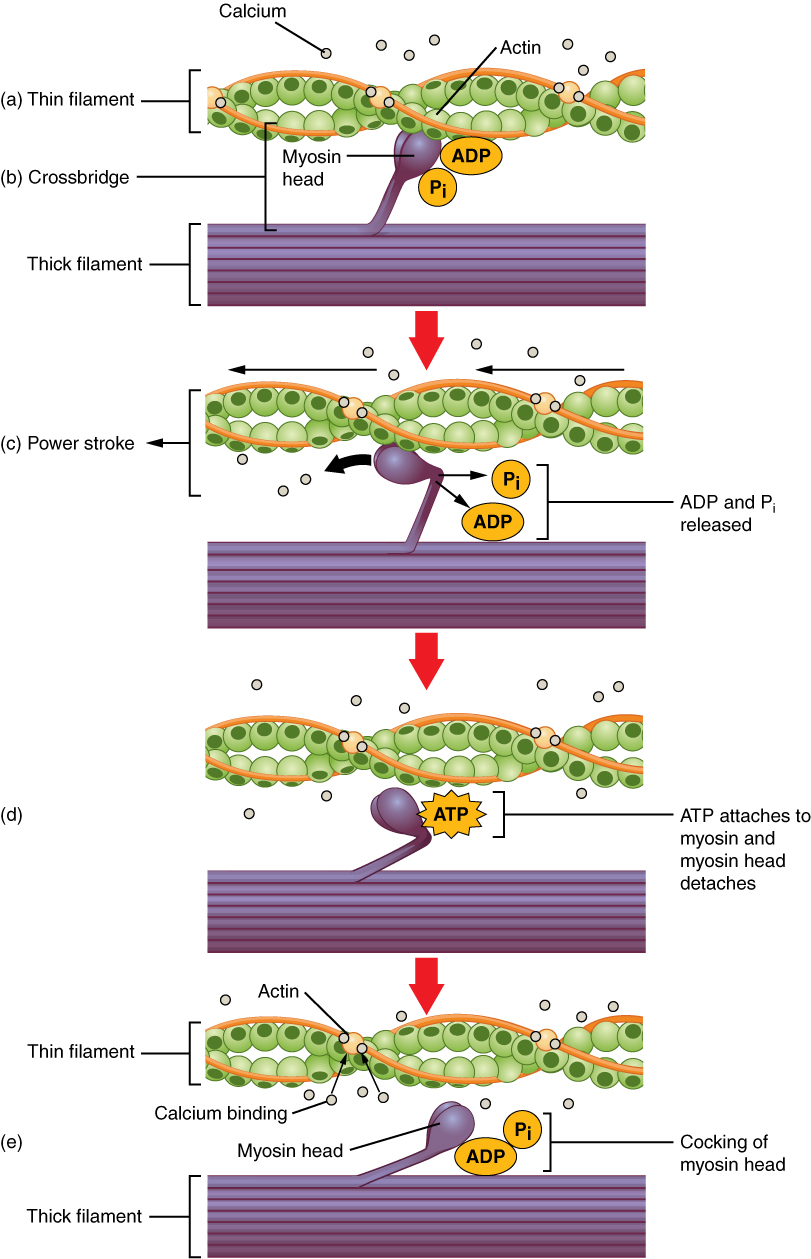
As muscles contract, they use ATP. The energy needed to make ATP comes from a variety of different pathways—such as glycolysis or oxidative phosphorylation—that ultimately use glucose as a starting material.

In striated skeletal muscle cells, GLUT4 concentration in the plasma membrane can increase as a result of either exercise or muscle contraction.

During exercise, the body needs to convert glucose to ATP to be used as energy. As G-6-P concentrations decrease, hexokinase becomes less inhibited, and the glycolytic and oxidative pathways that make ATP are able to proceed. This also means that muscle cells are able to take in more glucose as its intracellular concentrations decrease. In order to increase glucose levels in the cell, GLUT4 is the primary transporter used in this facilitated diffusion.

Although muscle contractions function in a similar way and also induce the translocation of GLUT4 into the plasma membrane, the two skeletal muscle processes obtain different forms of intracellular GLUT4. The GLUT4 carrier vesicles are either transferrin positive or negative, and are recruited by different stimuli. Transferrin-positive GLUT4 vesicles are utilized during muscle contraction while the transferrin-negative vesicles are activated by insulin stimulation as well as by exercise.

=== Cardiac muscle ===
Cardiac muscle is slightly different from skeletal muscle. At rest, they prefer to utilize fatty acids as their main energy source. As activity increases and it begins to pump faster, the cardiac muscles begin to oxidize glucose at a higher rate.

An analysis of mRNA levels of GLUT1 and GLUT4 in cardiac muscles show that GLUT1 plays a larger role in cardiac muscles than it does in skeletal muscles. GLUT4, however, is still believed to be the primary transporter for glucose.

Much like in other tissues, GLUT4 also responds to insulin signaling, and is transported into the plasma membrane to facilitate the diffusion of glucose into the cell.

=== Adipose tissue ===
Adipose tissue, commonly known as fat, is a depository for energy in order to conserve metabolic homeostasis. As the body takes in energy in the form of glucose, some is expended, and the rest is stored as glycogen (primarily in the liver, muscle cells), or as triglyceride in adipose tissue.

An imbalance in glucose intake and energy expenditure has been shown to lead to both adipose cell hypertrophy and hyperplasia, which lead to obesity. In addition, mutations in GLUT4 genes in adipocytes can also lead to increased GLUT4 expression in adipose cells, which allows for increased glucose uptake and therefore more fat stored. If GLUT4 is over-expressed, it can actually alter nutrient distribution and send excess glucose into adipose tissue, leading to increased adipose tissue mass.

== Regulation ==
=== Insulin ===
Insulin is released from the pancreas and into the bloodstream in response to increased glucose concentration in the blood. Insulin is stored in beta cells in the pancreas. When glucose in the blood binds to glucose receptors on the beta cell membrane, a signal cascade is initiated inside the cell that results in insulin stored in vesicles in these cells being released into the blood stream. Increased insulin levels cause the uptake of glucose into the cells. GLUT4 is stored in the cell in transport vesicles, and is quickly incorporated into the plasma membrane of the cell when insulin binds to membrane receptors.

Under conditions of low insulin, most GLUT4 is sequestered in intracellular vesicles in muscle and fat cells. As the vesicles fuse with the plasma membrane, GLUT4 transporters are inserted and become available for transporting glucose, and glucose absorption increases. The genetically engineered muscle insulin receptor knock‐out (MIRKO) mouse was designed to be insensitive to glucose uptake caused by insulin, meaning that GLUT4 is absent. Mice with diabetes or fasting hyperglycemia, however, were found to be immune to the negative effects of the insensitivity.

The insulin signal transduction pathway begins when insulin binds to the insulin receptor proteins. Once the transduction pathway is completed, the GLUT-4 storage vesicles becomes one with the cellular membrane. As a result, the GLUT-4 protein channels become embedded into the membrane, allowing glucose to be transported into the cell.

The mechanism for GLUT4 is an example of a cascade effect, where binding of a ligand to a membrane receptor amplifies the signal and causes a cellular response. In this case, insulin binds to the insulin receptor in its dimeric form and activates the receptor's tyrosine-kinase domain. The receptor then recruits Insulin Receptor Substrate, or IRS-1, which binds the enzyme PI-3 kinase. PI-3 kinase converts the membrane lipid PIP_{2} to PIP_{3}. PIP_{3} is specifically recognized by PKB (protein kinase B) and by PDK1, which can phosphorylate and activate PKB. Once phosphorylated, PKB is in its active form and phosphorylates TBC1D4, which inhibits the GTPase-activating domain associated with TBC1D4, allowing for Rab protein to change from its GDP to GTP bound state. Inhibition of the GTPase-activating domain leaves proteins next in the cascade in their active form, and stimulates GLUT4 to be expressed on the plasma membrane.

RAC1 is a GTPase also activated by insulin. Rac1 stimulates reorganization of the cortical Actin cytoskeleton which allows for the GLUT4 vesicles to be inserted into the plasma membrane. A RAC1 Knockout mouse has reduced glucose uptake in muscle tissue.

Knockout mice that are heterozygous for GLUT4 develop insulin resistance in their muscles as well as diabetes.

=== Muscle contraction ===
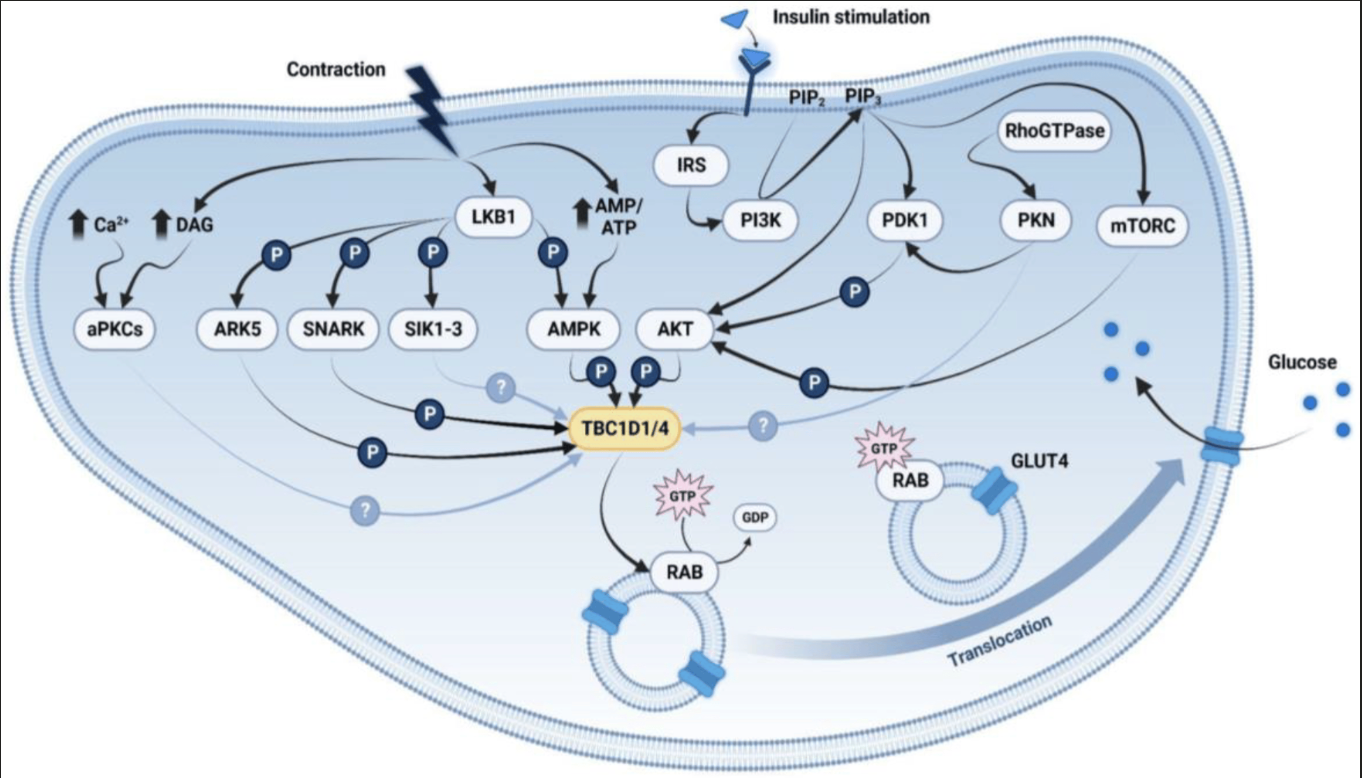
Intracellular signaling pathways for insulin- and contraction-stimulated glucose transporter 4 (GLUT4) translocation in skeletal muscle through the regulation of TBC1D1 and TBC1D4.

Muscle contraction stimulates muscle cells to translocate GLUT4 receptors to their surfaces. This is especially true in cardiac muscle, where continuous contraction increases the rate of GLUT4 translocation; but is observed to a lesser extent in increased skeletal muscle contraction. In skeletal muscle, muscle contractions substantially increase GLUT4 translocation, which is regulated by RAC1 and AMP-activated protein kinase (AMPK). Contraction-induced glucose uptake involves the phosphorylation of RabGaps, TBC1D1 and TBC1D4, by AMPK and other kinases such as SNARK. This mechanism remains functional in insulin-resistant states, establishing the muscle-contraction pathway's independence from insulin stimulation. The figure to the right demonstrates how insulin- and contraction-stimulated GLUT4 translocation differ but ultimately converge on TBC1D1/4. Phosphorylation of TBC1D1/4 inactivates it, allowing Rab proteins to load GTP and directly participate in the trafficking of GLUT4 to the membrane.

AMPK plays a crucial role in the contraction pathway. ATP is known as an energy-sensing enzyme, as it's highly responsive to an increase in the AMP to ATP ratio. ATP is hydrolyzed to ADP during muscle contraction by actomyosin ATPase. Adenylate kinase subsequently converts ADP through the following reaction: 2ADP→ATP+AMP. This ensures rapid replenishment of ATP, while increasing AMP concentration. ATP competes with AMP for coupling to the AMPK binding domain and thus inhibits AMPK activity, particularly when the muscle is at rest and ATP concentration is high. AMP has a much stronger affinity for the binding domain (known as the Bateman domain) of AMPK, and will thus out-compete ATP as AMP concentration increases. This ultimately results in the phosphorylation and activation of AMPK by LKB1 and triggers a cascade of signaling events driven by AMPK, leading to the translocation of GLUT4.

Muscle stretching also stimulates GLUT4 translocation and glucose uptake in rodent muscle via RAC1.

== Interactions ==
GLUT4 has been shown to interact with death-associated protein 6, also known as Daxx. Daxx, which is used to regulate apoptosis, has been shown to associate with GLUT4 in the cytoplasm. UBX-domains, such as the one found in GLUT4, have been shown to associate with apoptotic signaling. So this interaction aids in the translocation of Daxx within the cell.

In addition, recent reports demonstrated the presence of GLUT4 gene in central nervous system such as the hippocampus. Moreover, impairment in insulin-stimulated trafficking of GLUT4 in the hippocampus result in decreased metabolic activities and plasticity of hippocampal neurons, which leads to depressive like behaviour and cognitive dysfunction.

== Interactive pathway map ==
Click on genes, proteins and metabolites below to link to respective articles. (Note: The interactive pathway map can be edited at WikiPathways: "GlycolysisGluconeogenesis_WP534".)

Glycolysis and Gluconeogenesis edit
