= Nodular fasciitis =

- Other names: Nodular pseudosarcomatous fasciitis, subcutaneous pseudosarcomatous fibromatosis
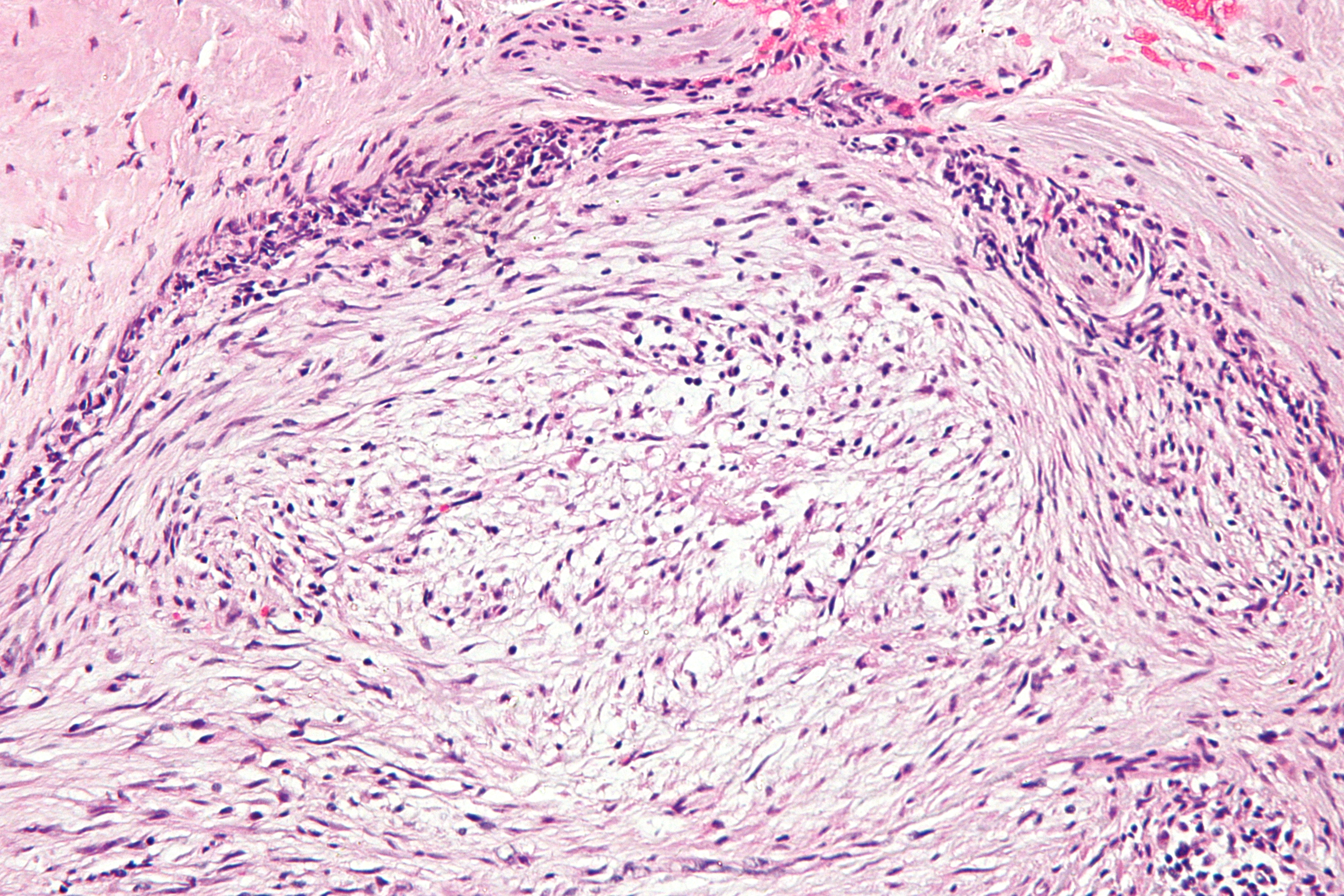
- Micrograph of nodular fasciitis showing the haphazard arrangement of cells (tissue culture-like pattern). H&E stain.
- Specialty: Rheumatology
- Types: Cranial fasciitis, intravascular fasciitis

Nodular fasciitis (NF) is a benign, soft tissue tumor composed of myofibroblasts that typically occurs in subcutaneous tissue, fascia, and/or muscles. The literature sometimes titles rare NF variants according to their tissue locations. The most frequently used and important of these are cranial fasciitis and intravascular fasciitis. In 2020, the World Health Organization classified nodular fasciitis as in the category of benign fibroblastic/myofibroblastic tumors. NF is the most common of the benign fibroblastic proliferative tumors of soft tissue.

Nodular fasciitis is a rapidly growing, usually self-limiting neoplasm that occurs primarily but not exclusively in adults. Due to its rapid growth, NF is often misdiagnosed as a malignant tumor, usually a sarcoma. Indeed, NF was originally termed subcutaneous pseudosarcomatous fibromatosis when first described in 1955 by Konwaler et al. The correct diagnosis of a tumor as NF is pivotal to prevent its overtreatment as a more aggressive or malignant growth.

While nodular fasciitis may be precipitated by localized injuries, recent studies indicate that NFs are true neoplasms (i.e. abnormal proliferations of cells without any precipitating event). Up to 92% of NF cases have a specific type of fusion gene in their tumor cells which may be responsible for disrupting the regulation of cell growth and death.

== Presentation ==
Nodular fasciitis occurs in all age groups but most often affects those between 20–40 years old. Males and females are equally affected. NF tumors, which may be tender or painful, typically present as rapidly growing solitary lesions that reach their final size (usually 2–3 cm) within a few weeks. They are located in the upper limbs (39–54% of cases), trunk (15–20% of cases), lower limbs (16–18% of cases), and head or neck area (20% of cases). Involvement of the head or neck area is more commonly observed in children. Cases of NF in joints or nerves are rare, but do occur. Individual cases of NF have been reported to occur in the bladder, prostate, tongue, lower female genital tract, and parotid gland. In some cases, NF tumors have regressed after incisional biopsy.

The cranial fasciitis variant of NF occurs in the soft and hard cranial tissues of the outer layers of the skull. Patients with this variant are more commonly males than females, and almost exclusively between 3 weeks and 6 years of age. They typically present with a tumor in areas of the head that lay directly over the temporal or parietal bones. Individual cases have been reported to occur in the lower jaw, frontonasal region, anterior nasal spine, the orbit, and maxilla. Characteristically, the tumor is rapidly enlarging, non-painful, rarely regressing without treatment, and potentially expanding into the skull's interior.

In a review of 50 cases, the intravascular fasciitis variant of NF occurred in individuals aged 6 months to 66 years (median age 27 years), with males and females being equally affected (52%:48%). Individuals with this variant commonly present with a blood vessel-localized tumor in the head and neck area (34% of cases), lower extremities (32% of cases), upper extremities (20% of cases), or trunk (14% of cases). The tumors originate in the small blood vessels of the oral mucosa, eyes, lips, cheeks, tongues, and subcutaneous tissue of the extremities (78% of all cases). About 18% of cases involve major veins. The presenting symptoms of these tumors are strictly dependent on their locations and impacts on the involved vasculature. Most cases involving superficial sites present with a small (mean diameter of 1.5 cm), painless, slowly growing mass. However, tumors growing in deep tissues can go unnoticed until they became large enough (e.g. 15 cm) to obstruct blood flow. Cases involving the ascending aorta can present with the signs and symptoms of acute aortic dissection (e.g. severe pain, heart failure, cardiac arrest, fainting, stroke, ischemic peripheral neuropathy, and/or paraplegia), while cases involving large veins may present with acute swelling, pain, and tissue/organ dysfunctions in the areas drained by the involved veins.

== Pathology ==
The microscopic histopathology of hematoxylin and eosin stained nodular fasciitis tumors consists of spindle-shaped myofibroblastic cells. These cells are in a myxoid or a collagenous (high content of collagen fibers) tissue background. The neoplastic myofibroblasts are arranged in whorls and/or short bundles. These cells may show high rates of replicating as judged by their mitotic index, but these mitoses are normal in appearance. The tumor tissues often contain red blood cells, lymphocytes, and giant osteoclast-like cells, and may contain sites of bone-like tissue. NF is sometimes classified into three subtypes based on its predominant histopathological pattern: myxoid or reactive (type I), cellular (type II), and fibrous (type III). These patterns appear related to the duration of the lesion, with the myxoid variant tending to have the shortest duration and the cellular and fibrous variants tending to have progressively longer durations. Immunohistochemical analyses indicate that the cells in NF usually express smooth muscle actin, muscle specific actin, and vimentin proteins but generally do not express CD34, S-100 protein, desmin, trypsin, factor VIII, F4/80, or HLA-DR1 proteins. Uncommonly, the cells in NF tumors express the CD68 (a histiocyte-specific marker) protein.

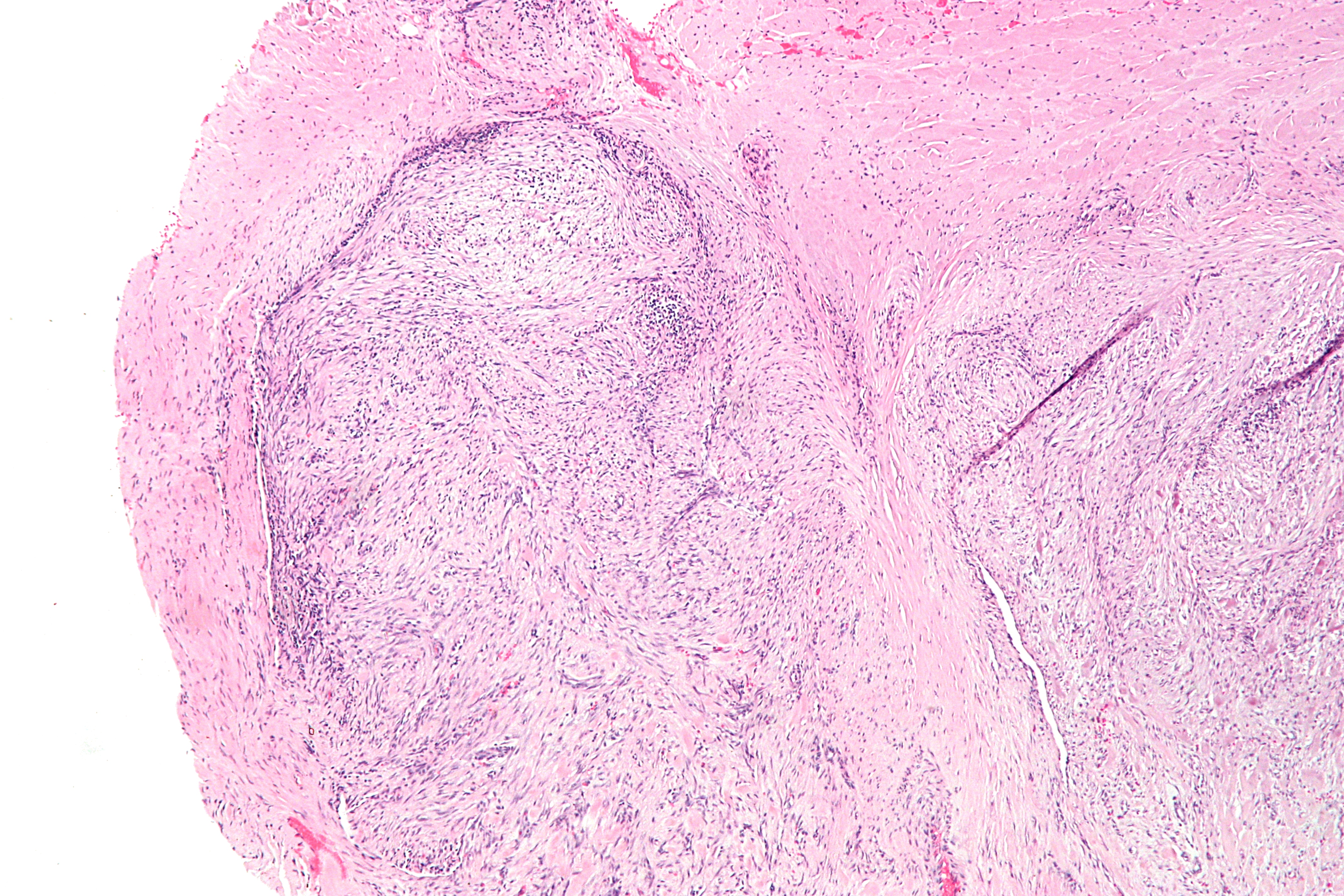
Low magnification

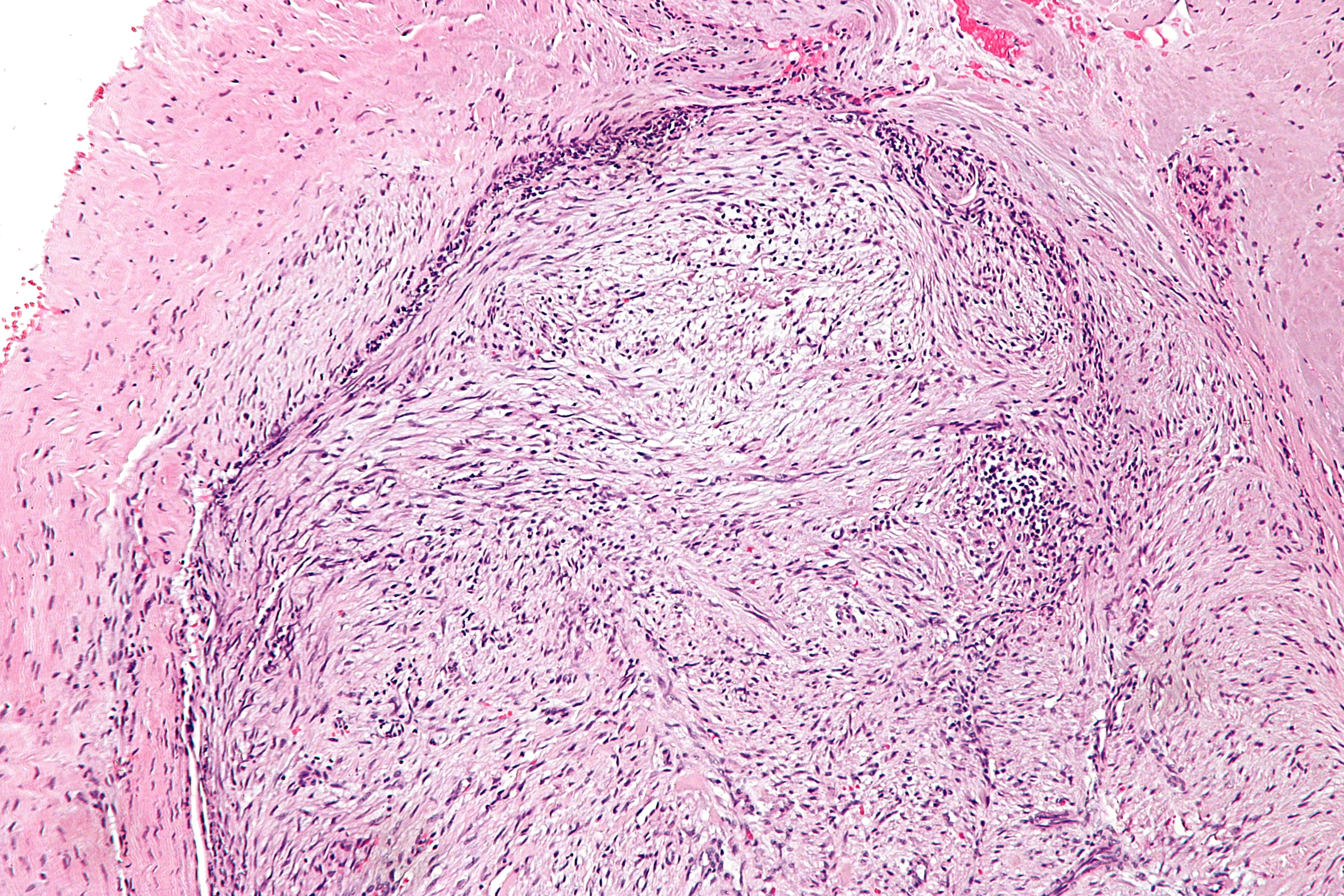
Intermediate magnification

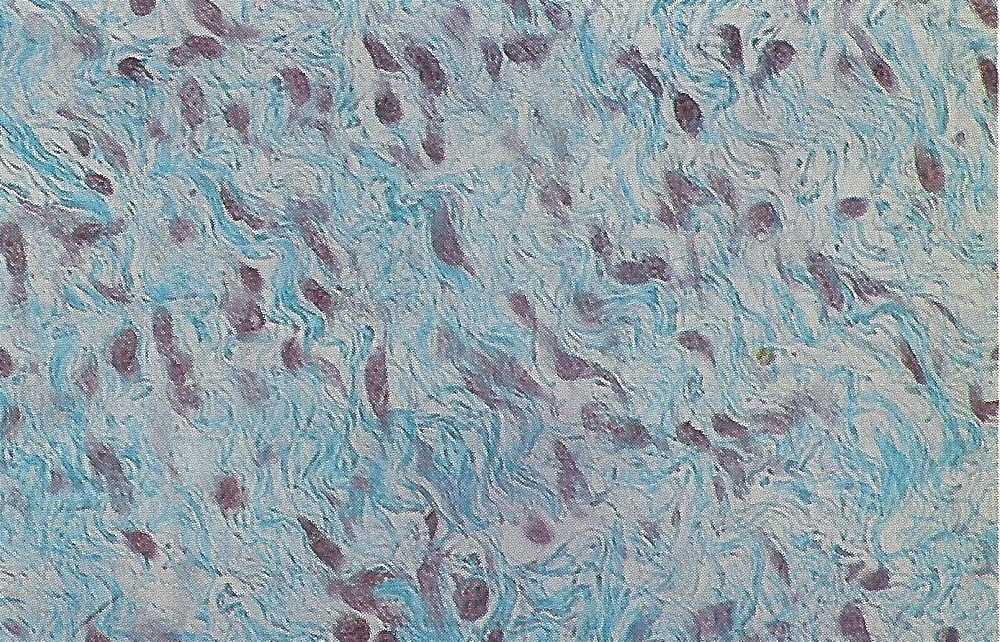
Goldner, 400x

The histopathology and expressions of marker proteins in cranial fasciitis tumors tend to be more organized and have higher levels of inflammatory cell infiltrates, vascularity, and involvements of underlying bone than NF.

The histopathology and expressions of marker proteins in intravascular fasciitis tumors tend to be arranged in a storiformed or haphazard pattern and have vesicle-containing nuclei with prominent nucleoli.

== Gene abnormalities ==
Until recently, nodular fasciitis was considered a reaction to trauma at the site where the tumor subsequently developed. However, recent findings indicate that up to 92% of NF tumors involve the self-limiting growth of a clone of neoplastic cells that contain a fusion gene. Fusion genes are abnormal genes consisting of parts from two different genes that form as a result of large scale gene mutations such as chromosomal translocations, interstitial deletions, or inversions. The fusion gene found in NF tumor cells consists of a part of the USP6 gene combined with any one of numerous other genes. Its most common partner gene in NF is the MYH9 (myosin-9) gene. This USP6-MYH9 fusion gene forms as a result of a translocation of part of the USP6 gene located at band 13.2 on the long (or "q") arm of chromosome 17, with part of the MYH9 gene at band 13.2 on the short (or "p") arm of chromosome 22. Other genes that partner with the USP6 gene to form a fusion gene found in NF include: RRBP1 (ribosome binding protein 1), CALU (calumenin), CTNNB1 (catenin beta 1), MIR22HG, SPARC (secreted protein acidic and cysteine rich), THBS2 (thrombospondin-2), COL6A2 (collagen type VI alpha 2 chain), SEC31A, EIF5A (eukaryotic translation initiation factor 5A), COL1A1 (collagen type I alpha 1 chain), COL1A2 (collagen type I alpha 2 chain), COL3A1 (collagen type III alpha 1 chain), PAFAH1B1 (platelet activating factor acetylhydrolase 1b regulatory subunit 1), SERPINH1 (serpin family H member 1), PDLIM7 (PDZ and LIM domain protein 7), and MYL12A (myosin regulatory light chain 12A) gene. While very few cases have been analyzed to date, USP6-containing fusion genes have been found in the tumor cells of 7 of 15 tested cases of cranial fasciitis and six of six tested cases of intravascular fasciitis.

All of the USP6-containing fusion genes in NF and variants overproduce a chimeric protein containing a part of the USP6 gene's product, ubiquitin carboxyl-terminal hydrolase 6a, that has uncontrolled deubiquitinating enzyme activity. This may result in the inappropriate stimulation of multiple cell signaling pathways, including the Wnt signaling pathway, one of the JAK-STAT signaling pathways, the c-Jun signaling pathway, and the NF-κB signaling pathway. Each of these pathways, when inappropriately activated, has been implicated in promoting the development of various tumors and cancers. Further studies are needed to determine which, if any, of these pathways are overactive and can be successfully targeted with specific drug therapies to treat NF and its variants.

Two cases of NF have shown tumor cells in which the USP6 gene has fused with the PPP6R3 gene. In both of these cases, the tumors clearly showed malignant behavior.

== Diagnosis ==
NF may resemble and therefore be misdiagnosed as dermatofibrosarcoma protuberans, fibrosarcoma, malignant fibrous histiocytoma, spindle-cell melanoma, leiomyosarcoma, or inflammatory myofibroblastic tumor. The diagnosis of NF and its variants depends on a combination of findings, no single one of which is definitive. These include: presentation (especially location in the cranium, within blood vessels, or outside of these areas); histopathology (analyses of tumor cell mitoses which, if atypical, strongly suggest the tumor is not NF); presence of myofibroblasts that typically express muscle-specific actin, SMA, and vimentin, may express CD68, but generally do not express S100, desmin, trypsin, factor VIII, F4/80, or CD34; and presence of typical neoplastic cells expressing an USP6-containing fusion gene.

While virtually all cases of NF and variants have had excellent prognoses, the two cases of individuals with an USP6-PPP6R3 fusion gene in their NF tumor cells had less favorable prognoses: their tumors were locally invasive, repeatedly relapsed after surgical removal, and grew progressively larger over 2 and 10 years of observations.

== Treatment ==
Some cases of NF have regressed after being partially biopsied, suggesting that a watchful waiting approach may be appropriate after biopsy in some cases. The most common and generally accepted first-line treatment for cases of NF, craniofacial fasciitis, and intravascular fasciitis tumors is surgical removal. In almost all cases this removal is curative, and tumor recurrences are uncommon, even in cases where the tumor is only partially removed. Furthermore, tumor recurrences are typically cured by simple re-excisions. NF cases have also been successfully treated with corticosteroid drugs (e.g. triamcinolone) injected directly into the tumor. This treatment has been most often used for patients with recurrent tumors. Some studies, however, have suggested reevaluating the diagnosis in recurrent NF tumors to ensure the diagnosis is correct. Surgical and corticosteroid interventions may need to be performed promptly in order to prevent a cranial tumor from expanding into the skull's interior or an intravascular tumor from compromising blood flood flow.

== Prognosis ==
Two cases of NF in which tumor cells expressed a USP6-PPP6R3 fusion gene had highly aggressive, locally invasive, repeatedly recurrent, and progressively enlarging tumors over 2 and ten years. One case developed multiple metastases that were partially controlled with radiation therapy. The other case was treated by wide surgical resection of the tumor; this case did not have metastatic disease and one year after the wide resection had no recurrences.

== See also ==
- Leiomyosarcoma
- List of cutaneous conditions
- Inflammatory myofibroblastic tumour
