= RAB2B =

Protein-coding gene in the species Homo sapiens

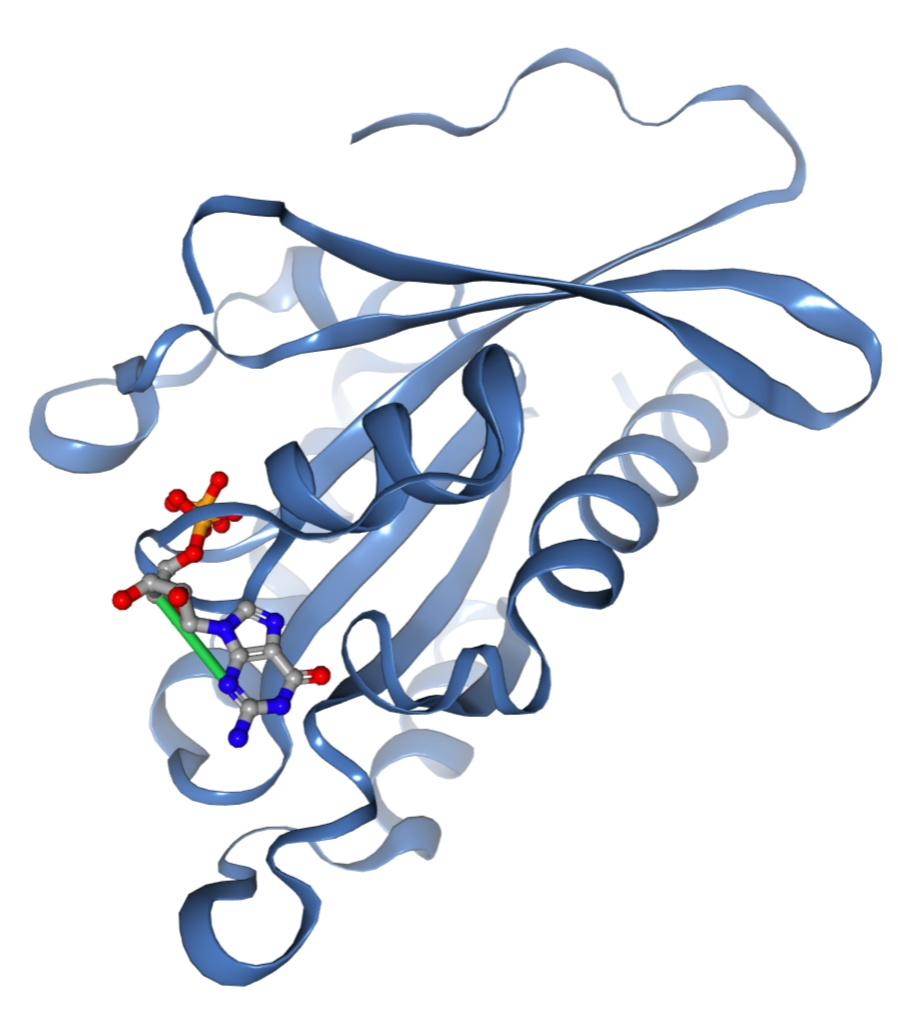

Identifiers
- Aliases: RAB2B, member RAS oncogene family, RAB protein-GTP binding protein- RAS protein
- External IDs: OMIM: 607466; MGI: 1923588; GeneCards: RAB2B
Available structures
PDB	Ortholog search: PDBe RCSB
PDB	List of PDB id codes 2A5J
Enzyme activity
EC #	BRENDA	ExPASy	KEGG	MetaCyc
3.6.5.2	↗	↗	↗	↗

Gene location (Human)
Chr.	Chromosome 14 (human)
Band	14q11.2	Start	21,459,020 bp
Band	14q11.2	End	21,476,960 bp

Gene location (Mouse)
Chr.	Chromosome 14 (mouse)
Band	14|14 C2	Start	52,499,216 bp
Band	14|14 C2	End	52,517,002 bp
RNA expression pattern
Bgee	Human / Mouse (ortholog); Top expressed in: pancreatic ductal cell; mucosa of ileum; Achilles tendon; secondary oocyte; trabecular bone; bone marrow; ganglionic eminence; skin of thigh; skin of arm; islet of Langerhans / Top expressed in: fossa; substantia nigra; internal carotid artery; external carotid artery; motor neuron; trigeminal ganglion; condyle; sciatic nerve; epithelium of lens; ureter; More reference expression data
BioGPS	n/a
Gene ontology
Molecular function	nucleotide binding; GTP binding; protein binding; GTPase activity
Cellular component	plasma membrane; Golgi apparatus; extracellular exosome; endoplasmic reticulum membrane; endoplasmic reticulum; membrane; Golgi membrane; presynapse
Biological process	protein transport; positive regulation of exocytosis; vesicle-mediated transport; transport; intracellular protein transport; Rab protein signal transduction
Sources:Amigo / QuickGO
Orthologs
Databases	NCBI: entry; OMA: entry
Species	Human	Mouse
Entrez	84932	76338
Ensembl	ENSG00000129472	ENSMUSG00000022159
UniProt	Q8WUD1	P59279
RefSeq (mRNA)	NM_001163380; NM_032846	NM_172601
RefSeq (protein)	NP_001156852; NP_116235	NP_766189
Location (UCSC)	Chr 14: 21.46 – 21.48 Mb	Chr 14: 52.5 – 52.52 Mb
PubMed search
- Wikidata
View/Edit Human	View/Edit Mouse

Ras-related protein Rab-2B is a protein that in humans is encoded by the RAB2B gene.

RAB2B is required for protein transport from the endoplasmic reticulum to the Golgi complex. It belongs to the small GTPase superfamily, specifically to the RAB protein family. Small GTPases are a type of hydrolase enzymes that can attach to a GTP to form a GDP. This process makes small GTPases active when bonded to a GTP and inactive when bonded to a GDP. Inside this small GTPase superfamily we can find the RAS subfamily. This family is divided into 5 groups: Ras, Rho, Ran, Rab and Arf GTPases. RAB2B’s main function is regulating vesicle transport and membrane fusion.

== Structure ==
RAB2B is a human protein whose gene is located in the fourteenth chromosome. It has a core made of basic elements such as oxygen, carbon, nitrogen and phosphorus. Its secondary structure contains eight alpha helix and six beta strands. Moreover, it has attached a magnesium ion and a GDP.

Mature RAB2B contains three post-translational modifications, a phosphoserine is found in the location 202 instead of a normal serine, and two lipidations can be found in locations 215-216. It has a motif domain between the amino acids 35 and 43.

Due to the alternative splicing, two isoforms of this same protein exist. Isoform 1 is the canonical sequence, meaning it is the most common one, having a molecular weight of 24,214 Da. Isoform 2 consists just of 151 amino acids, having a mass of 16,667 Da.

== Function ==
Small GTPases of the RAB superfamily are recognized as key players of the protein machinery involved in vesicular transport and organelle dynamics in eukaryotic cells. RAB2B follows mainly exocytic pathways, from the endoplasmic reticulum to Golgi complex. RAB proteins are involved in docking and fusion of transport vesicles with their target membranes. These proteins associate with effector proteins (GARIL4 and GARIL5) to create complexes.

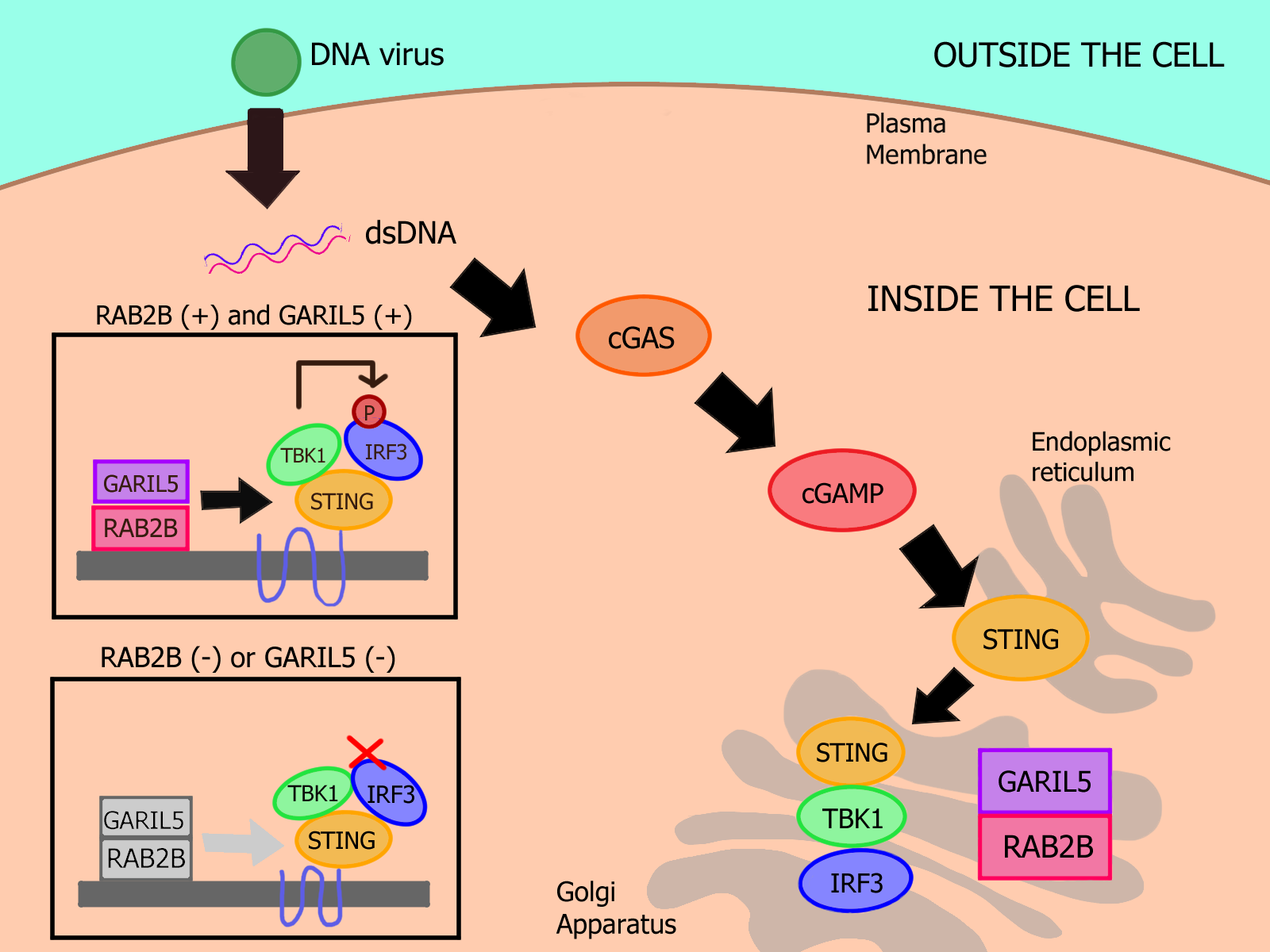
Representation of how RAB2B acts during an antiviral response and the elements it interacts with

In order to do its biological function, RAB2B has to switch from the GDP form to the GTP form, and this is possible thanks to the catalysation of GEF proteins, which are guanine exchange factors. On the other hand, when RAB2B are inactive in the cytosol, the GDP form is maintained due to the interaction with GDI proteins, which are GDP dissociation proteins.

Studies have also shown that RAB2B affects the IFN antiviral response which is induced by cytosolic DNA. Because of this, RAB2B deficiency allows for vaccinia virus to replicate itself. After DNA stimulation, RAB2B attaches itself on the Golgi apparatus, along with stimulator of interferon genes (STING), the downstream signal mediator of cGAS. In order for RAB2B to adhere to the Golgi apparatus, RAB2B’s GTP-binding activity is required, as well as for the recruitment of GARIL5, so the RAB2B-GARIL5 complex can be formed. It is also shown that GARIL5 deficiency affects the IFN antiviral response, indicating that the entire RAB2B-GARIL5 complex regulates the cGAS-STING signalling axis, thus promoting IFN responses against cytosolic DNA (DNA viruses).

RAB2B isoform knockdown affects the morphology of the Golgi complex in mammals, inducing its fragmentation. Even though these RAB family proteins are highly homologous to each other (RAB2A and RAB2B have 85.8% amino acid identity), the knockdown of any of them (from RAB1A to RAB8A) causes Golgi complex to disperse through the cell's cytoplasm. Because of this, the RAB2B-GARIL5 complex stops functioning properly, affecting the IFN response and enhancing the replication of many viruses, as seen previously.

== Tissue distribution ==
The expression pattern of the human RAB2B gene reveals a transcript in kidney, prostate, lung, thymus, and colon, and a lower expression level in placenta, pancreas and skeletal muscle. Moreover, it is shown that the transcript is over-expressed in colon adenocarcinoma, as well as pancreatic cancer. This observation entails that this protein could have a close relationship with colon tumours.
