= RABIF =

Protein-coding gene in humans

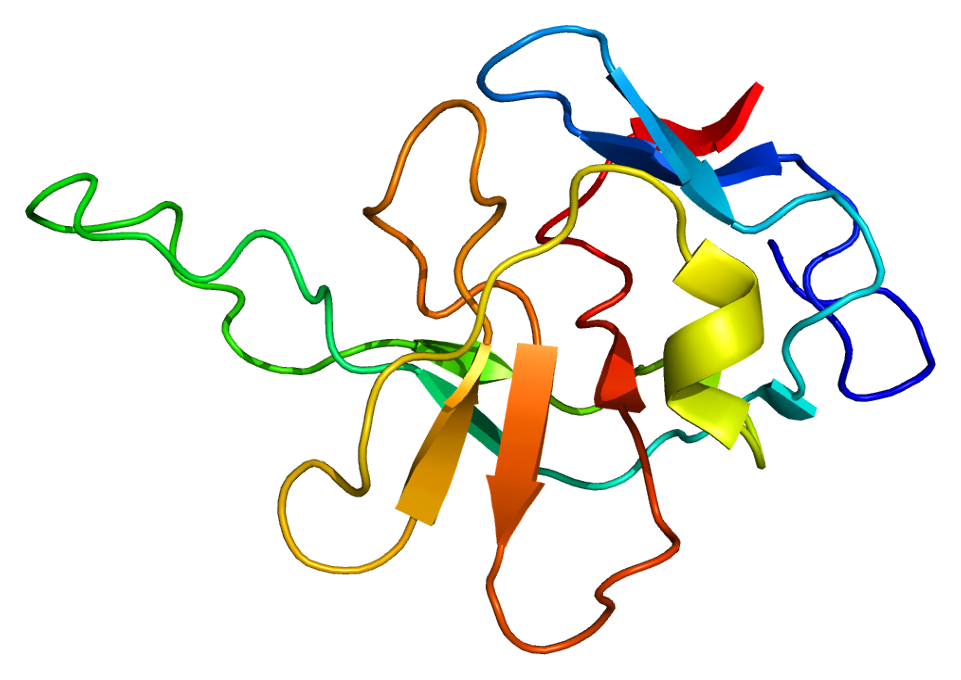

Identifiers
- Aliases: RABIF, MSS4, RASGFR3, RASGRF3, RAB interacting factor
- External IDs: OMIM: 603417; MGI: 2138605; GeneCards: RABIF
Available structures
| PDB | Ortholog search: PDBe RCSB |
| PDB | List of PDB id codes 1FWQ, 2FU5 |

Gene location (Human)
| Chr. | Chromosome 1 (human) |
| Band | 1q32.1 | Start | 202,878,282 bp |
| Band | 1q32.1 | End | 202,889,149 bp |

Gene location (Mouse)
| Chr. | Chromosome 1 (mouse) |
| Band | 1|1 E4 | Start | 134,422,386 bp |
| Band | 1|1 E4 | End | 134,436,512 bp |
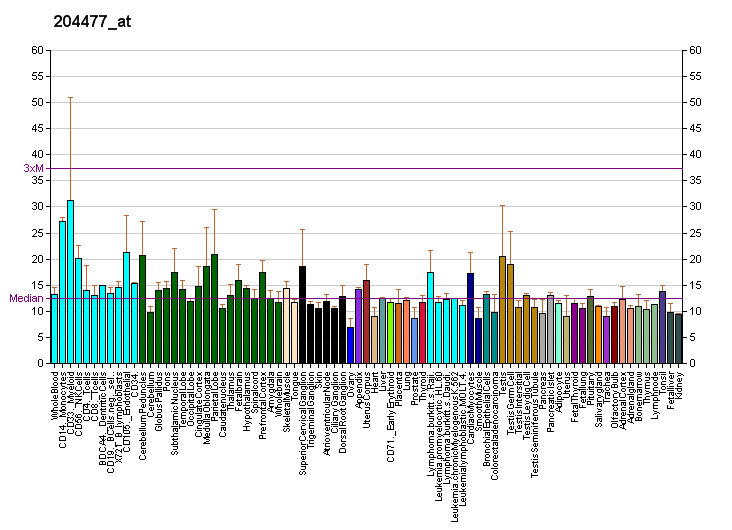

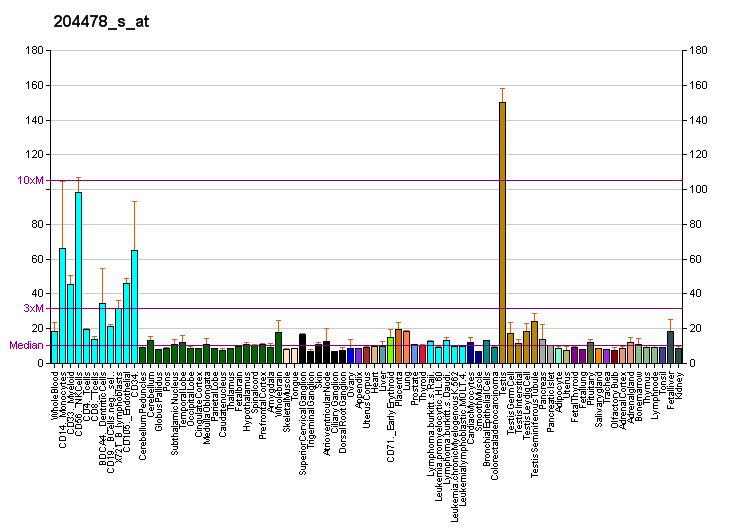
RNA expression pattern
| Bgee | Human / Mouse (ortholog); Top expressed in: sperm; hair follicle; Brodmann area 10; gingival epithelium; epithelium of esophagus; endothelial cell; amniotic fluid; gonad; testicle; pancreatic epithelial cell / Top expressed in: skin of external ear; interventricular septum; superior cervical ganglion; external carotid artery; dermis; granulocyte; anterior horn of spinal cord; pituitary gland; zygote; secondary oocyte; More reference expression data |
| BioGPS | More reference expression data |
Gene ontology
| Molecular function | zinc ion binding; protein binding; metal ion binding; guanyl-nucleotide exchange factor activity |
| Cellular component | cytosol; membrane |
| Biological process | protein transport; small GTPase mediated signal transduction; membrane fusion; post-Golgi vesicle-mediated transport |
Sources:Amigo / QuickGO
Orthologs
| Databases | NCBI: entry; OMA: entry |
| Species | Human | Mouse |
| Entrez | 5877 | 98710 |
| Ensembl | ENSG00000183155 | ENSMUSG00000042229 |
| UniProt | P47224 | Q91X96 |
| RefSeq (mRNA) | NM_002871 | NM_145510 |
| RefSeq (protein) | NP_002862 | NP_663485 |
| Location (UCSC) | Chr 1: 202.88 – 202.89 Mb | Chr 1: 134.42 – 134.44 Mb |
| PubMed search |
- Wikidata
| View/Edit Human | View/Edit Mouse |

Guanine nucleotide exchange factor MSS4 is a protein that in humans is encoded by the RABIF gene.

== Function ==
The Sec4/Rab-related small GTP-binding proteins are involved in the regulation of intracellular vesicular transport. Mss4 stimulates GTP-GDP exchange in Sec4 and Rab and binds to a subset of genetically related Rab proteins.
