= RAB13 =

Protein-coding gene in humans

Identifiers
- Aliases: RAB13, GIG4, member RAS oncogene family
- External IDs: OMIM: 602672; MGI: 1927232; GeneCards: RAB13
Enzyme activity
EC #	BRENDA	ExPASy	KEGG	MetaCyc
3.6.5.2	↗	↗	↗	↗

Gene location (Human)
Chr.	Chromosome 1 (human)
Band	1q21.3	Start	153,981,617 bp
Band	1q21.3	End	153,986,358 bp

Gene location (Mouse)
Chr.	Chromosome 3 (mouse)
Band	3 F1|3 39.21 cM	Start	90,121,002 bp
Band	3 F1|3 39.21 cM	End	90,133,692 bp
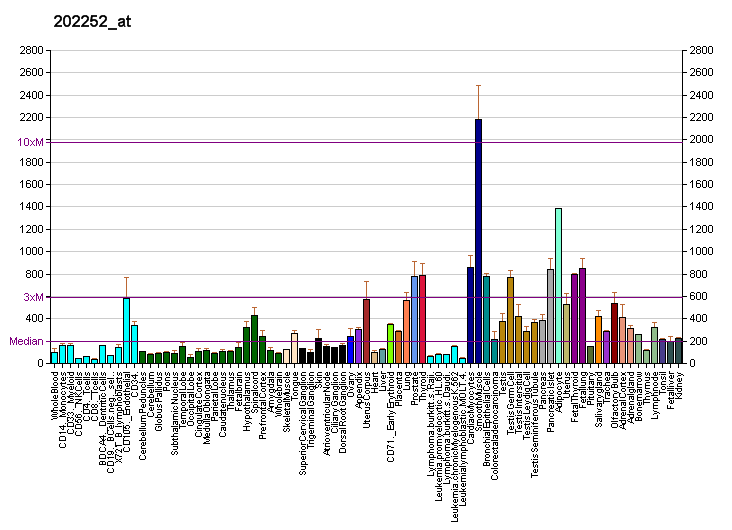
RNA expression pattern
Bgee	Human / Mouse (ortholog); Top expressed in: stromal cell of endometrium; gastric mucosa; Descending thoracic aorta; left coronary artery; right adrenal cortex; left adrenal cortex; fundus; prostate; human kidney; subcutaneous adipose tissue / Top expressed in: yolk sac; molar; lens; otic vesicle; utricle; efferent ductule; external carotid artery; tail of embryo; epithelium of small intestine; epiblast; More reference expression data
BioGPS	More reference expression data
Gene ontology
Molecular function	nucleotide binding; protein kinase A catalytic subunit binding; GTP binding; protein binding; GTPase activity
Cellular component	recycling endosome; endosome; Golgi apparatus; cell projection; lateral plasma membrane; membrane; cell-cell junction; bicellular tight junction; insulin-responsive compartment; plasma membrane; endocytic vesicle; recycling endosome membrane; trans-Golgi network; neuron projection; extracellular exosome; cytoplasmic vesicle; lamellipodium; cytosol; cell junction; cytoplasmic vesicle membrane
Biological process	trans-Golgi network to recycling endosome transport; establishment of Sertoli cell barrier; protein localization to cell leading edge; endosomal transport; bicellular tight junction assembly; endothelial cell chemotaxis; endocytic recycling; cellular response to insulin stimulus; protein kinase A signaling; protein transport; neuron projection development; cortical actin cytoskeleton organization; post-translational protein modification; transport; protein localization to plasma membrane; intracellular protein transport; Rab protein signal transduction
Sources:Amigo / QuickGO
Orthologs
Databases	NCBI: entry; OMA: entry
Species	Human	Mouse
Entrez	5872	68328
Ensembl	ENSG00000143545	ENSMUSG00000027935
UniProt	P51153	Q9DD03
RefSeq (mRNA)	NM_001272038; NM_002870	NM_001293741; NM_026677
RefSeq (protein)	NP_001258967; NP_002861	NP_001280670; NP_080953
Location (UCSC)	Chr 1: 153.98 – 153.99 Mb	Chr 3: 90.12 – 90.13 Mb
PubMed search
- Wikidata
View/Edit Human	View/Edit Mouse

Ras-related protein Rab-13 is a protein that in humans is encoded by the RAB13 gene.

The RAB13 gene is a member of the Rab family of small G proteins and plays a role in regulating membrane trafficking between trans-Golgi network (TGN) and recycling endosomes (RE).
