= TBC1D12 =

Protein-coding gene in the species Homo sapiens

Identifiers
- Aliases: TBC1D12, Tbc1 domain family, member 12, TBC1 domain family member 12
- External IDs: MGI: 2384803; GeneCards: TBC1D12

Gene location (Human)
Chr.	Chromosome 10 (human)
Band	10q23.33	Start	94,402,541 bp
Band	10q23.33	End	94,536,332 bp

Gene location (Mouse)
Chr.	Chromosome 19 (mouse)
Band	19|19 C3	Start	38,825,023 bp
Band	19|19 C3	End	38,908,367 bp
RNA expression pattern
Bgee	Human / Mouse (ortholog); Top expressed in: C1 segment; corpus callosum; inferior olivary nucleus; inferior ganglion of vagus nerve; internal globus pallidus; subthalamic nucleus; substantia nigra; dorsal motor nucleus of vagus nerve; tibia; jejunal mucosa / Top expressed in: molar; spermatocyte; otolith organ; trigeminal ganglion; utricle; deep cerebellar nuclei; suprachiasmatic nucleus; calvaria; ventral tegmental area; superior colliculus; More reference expression data
BioGPS	n/a
Gene ontology
Molecular function	GTPase activator activity
Cellular component	autophagosome; recycling endosome; intracellular anatomical structure
Biological process	regulation of vesicle fusion; regulation of autophagosome assembly; intracellular protein transport; activation of GTPase activity
Sources:Amigo / QuickGO
Orthologs
Databases	NCBI: entry; OMA: entry
Species	Human	Mouse
Entrez	23232	209478
Ensembl	ENSG00000108239	ENSMUSG00000048720
UniProt	O60347	Q6A039
RefSeq (mRNA)	NM_015188	NM_145952; NM_001362424
RefSeq (protein)	NP_056003	NP_666064; NP_001349353
Location (UCSC)	Chr 10: 94.4 – 94.54 Mb	Chr 19: 38.83 – 38.91 Mb
PubMed search
- Wikidata
View/Edit Human	View/Edit Mouse

TBC1D12 is a protein with a conserved TBC domain that in humans is encoded by the TBC1D12 gene.
