= TBC1D1 =

Protein-coding gene in the species Homo sapiens

Identifiers
- Aliases: TBC1D1, TBC, TBC1, TBC1 domain family member 1
- External IDs: OMIM: 609850; MGI: 1889508; GeneCards: TBC1D1
Available structures
| PDB | Ortholog search: PDBe RCSB |
| PDB | List of PDB id codes 3QYE |

Gene location (Human)
| Chr. | Chromosome 4 (human) |
| Band | 4p14 | Start | 37,891,084 bp |
| Band | 4p14 | End | 38,139,175 bp |

Gene location (Mouse)
| Chr. | Chromosome 5 (mouse) |
| Band | 5 C3.1|5 32.8 cM | Start | 64,313,648 bp |
| Band | 5 C3.1|5 32.8 cM | End | 64,508,829 bp |
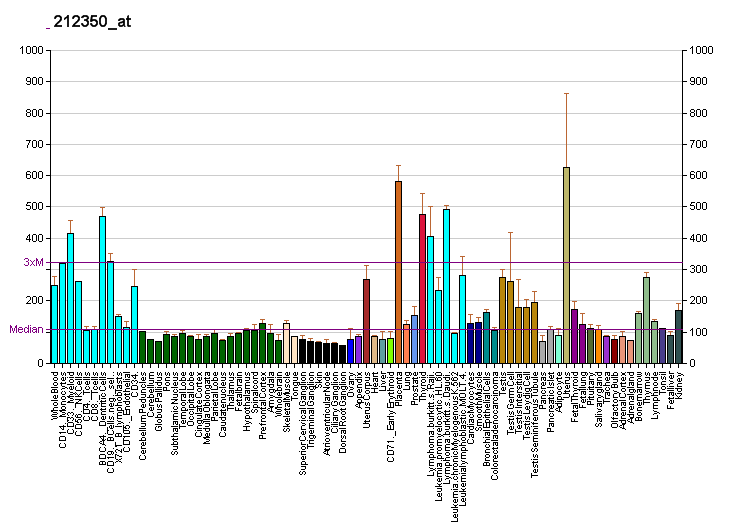
RNA expression pattern
| Bgee | Human / Mouse (ortholog); Top expressed in: ventricular zone; body of uterus; muscle layer of sigmoid colon; right coronary artery; ganglionic eminence; popliteal artery; tibial arteries; gastric mucosa; left coronary artery; ascending aorta / Top expressed in: muscle of thigh; spermatocyte; zygote; retinal pigment epithelium; choroid plexus of fourth ventricle; granulocyte; secondary oocyte; right kidney; spermatid; plantaris muscle; More reference expression data |
| BioGPS | More reference expression data |
Gene ontology
| Molecular function | protein binding; GTPase activator activity |
| Cellular component | cytosol; nucleus; endomembrane system; intracellular anatomical structure |
| Biological process | regulation of cilium assembly; membrane organization; regulation of protein localization; activation of GTPase activity; regulation of vesicle fusion; intracellular protein transport |
Sources:Amigo / QuickGO
Orthologs
| Databases | NCBI: entry; OMA: entry |
| Species | Human | Mouse |
| Entrez | 23216 | 57915 |
| Ensembl | ENSG00000065882 | ENSMUSG00000029174 |
| UniProt | Q86TI0 | Q60949 |
| RefSeq (mRNA) | NM_001253912; NM_001253913; NM_001253914; NM_001253915; NM_015173 NM_001396959 | NM_001289514; NM_019636; NM_001310611 |
| RefSeq (protein) | NP_001240841; NP_001240842; NP_001240843; NP_001240844; NP_055988 | NP_001276443; NP_001297540; NP_062610 |
| Location (UCSC) | Chr 4: 37.89 – 38.14 Mb | Chr 5: 64.31 – 64.51 Mb |
| PubMed search |
- Wikidata
| View/Edit Human | View/Edit Mouse |

TBC1 domain family member 1 is a protein that in humans is encoded by the TBC1D1 gene.

TBC1D1 is the founding member of a family of proteins sharing a 180- to 200-amino acid TBC domain presumed to have a role in regulating cell growth and cell differentiation. These proteins share significant homology with TRE2 (USP6), yeast Bub2, and CDC16 (White et al., 2000).[supplied by OMIM]
