= PPP6R3 =

Identifiers
- Aliases: PPP6R3, C11orf23, PP6R3, SAP190, SAPL, SAPLa, SAPS3, protein phosphatase 6 regulatory subunit 3
- External IDs: OMIM: 610879; MGI: 1921807; GeneCards: PPP6R3

Gene location (Mouse)
Chr.	Chromosome 19 (mouse)
Band	19 A|19 3.21 cM	Start	3,504,928 bp
Band	19 A|19 3.21 cM	End	3,625,749 bp
Gene ontology
Molecular function	protein phosphatase binding; protein binding
Cellular component	plasma membrane; nucleus; nucleoplasm; Golgi membrane; cytoplasm; cytosol
Biological process	regulation of phosphoprotein phosphatase activity; COPII vesicle coating
Sources:Amigo / QuickGO
Orthologs
Databases	NCBI: entry; OMA: entry
Species	Human	Mouse
Entrez	55291	52036
Ensembl	ENSG00000110075	ENSMUSG00000024908
UniProt	Q5H9R7	Q922D4
RefSeq (mRNA)	NM_001164160; NM_001164161; NM_001164162; NM_001164163; NM_001164164 NM_018312	NM_001164159; NM_028999; NM_029456; NM_001360429; NM_001360430
RefSeq (protein)	NP_001157632; NP_001157633; NP_001157634; NP_001157635; NP_001157636 NP_060782; NP_001339276; NP_001339277; NP_001339279; NP_001339280; NP_001339281; NP_001339282; NP_001339283; NP_001339284; NP_001339285; NP_001339286; NP_001339287; NP_001339288; NP_001339289; NP_001339290; NP_001339291; NP_001339292; NP_001339293; NP_001339294; NP_001339295; NP_001339297; NP_001339298; NP_001339299; NP_001339300; NP_001339301; NP_001339302; NP_001339303; NP_001339304; NP_001339305; NP_001339306; NP_001339307; NP_001339308; NP_001339309	NP_001157631; NP_083275; NP_083732; NP_001347358; NP_001347359
Location (UCSC)	n/a	Chr 19: 3.5 – 3.63 Mb
PubMed search
- Wikidata
View/Edit Human	View/Edit Mouse

Serine/threonine-protein phosphatase 6 regulatory subunit 3 is a protein that in humans is encoded by the gene PPP6R3 (also termed C11orf23, PP6R3, SAP190, SAPL, SAPLa, and SAPS3). PPP6R3 is expressed in all tissues tested in humans. It encodes protein phosphatase 6 regulatory subunit 3 (PP6RS3). PP6RS3 is the function-regulating subunit of protein phosphatase 6 (PPP6C). PPP6C is a component of a signaling pathway that regulates various cell functions including cell division, the repair of damaged DNA, inflammatory responses, messenger mRNA splicing, and the stability of chromosomes.

Two cases of nodular fasciitis have malignant tumors in which the neoplastic cells expressed a PPP6R3 gene merged to the USP6 (i.e. ubiquitin carboxyl-terminal hydrolase 6) gene to form an USP-PPP6R3 fusion gene. In both of these cases, the USP-PPP6R3 fusion genes was considered to contribute to these tumors malignancy.
