= RAB17 =

Protein-coding gene in the species Homo sapiens

Identifiers
- Aliases: RAB17, member RAS oncogene family
- External IDs: OMIM: 602206; MGI: 104640; GeneCards: RAB17
Enzyme activity
EC #	BRENDA	ExPASy	KEGG	MetaCyc
3.6.5.2	↗	↗	↗	↗

Gene location (Human)
Chr.	Chromosome 2 (human)
Band	2q37.3	Start	237,574,322 bp
Band	2q37.3	End	237,601,614 bp

Gene location (Mouse)
Chr.	Chromosome 1 (mouse)
Band	1 D|1 45.84 cM	Start	90,885,855 bp
Band	1 D|1 45.84 cM	End	90,897,383 bp
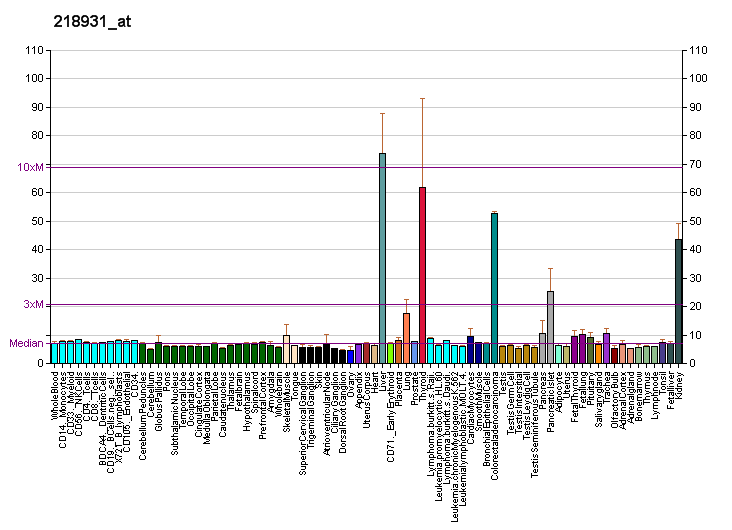
RNA expression pattern
Bgee	Human / Mouse (ortholog); Top expressed in: right lobe of liver; renal medulla; body of pancreas; left lobe of thyroid gland; right lobe of thyroid gland; human kidney; mucosa of transverse colon; right uterine tube; mucosa of ileum; jejunal mucosa / Top expressed in: submandibular gland; Paneth cell; jejunum; medullary collecting duct; ileum; vestibular membrane of cochlear duct; duodenum; proximal tubule; parotid gland; crypt of lieberkuhn of small intestine; More reference expression data
BioGPS	More reference expression data
Gene ontology
Molecular function	nucleotide binding; GDP binding; GTP binding; protein binding; GTPase activity
Cellular component	recycling endosome; endosome; cell projection; membrane; melanosome; plasma membrane; endocytic vesicle; intracellular anatomical structure; soma; recycling endosome membrane; dendrite; basolateral plasma membrane; early endosome; apical plasma membrane; extracellular exosome
Biological process	regulation of endocytosis; regulation of filopodium assembly; regulation of synapse assembly; filopodium assembly; regulation of dendrite development; transcytosis; establishment of melanosome localization; melanosome transport; endocytic recycling; protein transport; immunoglobulin transcytosis in epithelial cells mediated by polymeric immunoglobulin receptor; cilium assembly; transport; intracellular protein transport; Rab protein signal transduction; small GTPase mediated signal transduction
Sources:Amigo / QuickGO
Orthologs
Databases	NCBI: entry; OMA: entry
Species	Human	Mouse
Entrez	64284	19329
Ensembl	ENSG00000124839	ENSMUSG00000026304
UniProt	Q9H0T7	P35292
RefSeq (mRNA)	NM_022449	NM_001159725; NM_008998
RefSeq (protein)	NP_071894; NP_071894.1	NP_001153197; NP_033024
Location (UCSC)	Chr 2: 237.57 – 237.6 Mb	Chr 1: 90.89 – 90.9 Mb
PubMed search
- Wikidata
View/Edit Human	View/Edit Mouse

Ras-related protein Rab-17 is a protein that in humans is encoded by the RAB17 gene.

In melanocytic cells RAB17 gene expression may be regulated by MITF.
