= MIR22HG =

Non-coding RNA in the species Homo sapiens

Identifiers
- Aliases: MIR22HG, C17orf91, MIR22 host gene
- External IDs: GeneCards: MIR22HG

Gene location (Human)
Chr.	Chromosome 17 (human)
Band	17p13.3	Start	1,711,447 bp
Band	17p13.3	End	1,717,174 bp
RNA expression pattern
Bgee	Human / Mouse (ortholog); Top expressed in: gastric mucosa; left uterine tube; right adrenal cortex; left adrenal cortex; gallbladder; right coronary artery; placenta; left coronary artery; apex of heart; duodenum / n/a; More reference expression data
BioGPS	n/a
Orthologs
Databases	NCBI: entry; OMA: entry
Species	Human	Mouse
Entrez	84981	n/a
Ensembl	ENSG00000186594; ENSG00000282800	n/a
UniProt	Q0VDD5	n/a
RefSeq (mRNA)	NM_001001870; NM_032895	n/a
RefSeq (protein)	n/a	n/a
Location (UCSC)	Chr 17: 1.71 – 1.72 Mb	n/a
PubMed search		n/a
- Wikidata
View/Edit Human

MIR22HG (MIR22 host gene), also known as C17orf91, MGC14376, MIRN22, hsa-mir-22, and miR-22 is a human gene that encodes a noncoding RNA (ncRNA).This RNA molecule is not translated into a protein but nonetheless may have important functions.

MIR22HG ncRNA is greater than 200 nucleotides in length and therefore informally classified as a long non-coding RNA, i.e. lncRNA. The MIR22HG gene is located at band 13.3 on the short (or "p") arm of chromosome 17. It is expressed in each of the 27 human tissues tested.

== Function ==
Many lncRNAs regulate diverse processes including cellular metabolism, proliferation, movement, differentiation (i.e. change of a cell from one type to another, usually more mature, cell type), apoptosis (i.e. programmed cell death), and the expression of various genes through chromatin remodeling, genomic imprinting, modulating the actions of other RNAs, and various other ways. The normal actions and functions of the MIR22HG gene are complex and have not been fully elucidated, but its primary function may be as a tumor suppressor gene. It is involved in the regulation of several signaling pathways including Wnt/β-catenin, epithelial-mesenchymal transition (EMT), notch, and STAT3.

== Clinical significance ==
When overexpressed, it acts as a tumor suppressor gene in many cancer types but in a few cancer types it acts as an oncogene, i.e. a tumor promoter gene: MIR22HG gene's impact on various cancers is strictly dependent on the type of cancer in which it operates.

The roles or the MIR22HG gene in cancers have generally been evaluated by: a) next-generation sequencing to quantify the levels of MIR22HG RNA in cancer samples, samples of nearby normal tissue of the same type as the cancer, and cultured cancer cells of the same type as the cancers; b) comparing MIR22HG lncRNA levels in patients with the same cancer to the severity (e.g. aggressiveness, recurrence rate, and survival rate) of their cancers; c) determining the potential mechanisms for the MIR22HG lncRNA's actions, generally by defining the effects of varying the levels of this lncRNA on various cancer-promoting or cancer-inhibiting cell signaling pathways in cultured cancer cells; and d) determining the activity of these cell signaling pathways in cancer tissues. These studies are important because they established the levels of MIR22HG lncRNA as prognosis indicators and suggest that this lncRNA and the implicated cancerous signaling pathways are therapeutic targets for treating these cancers.

=== Tumor-suppression ===
Some of the cancer types that have been associated with the MIR22HG gene and its lncRNA product acting to suppress the cancer are:

- Non-small-cell lung cancer (NSCLC): The MIR22HG gene was down-regulated (i.e. under-expressed to give low levels of this genes lncRNA) in the NSCLC tumors of individuals who had poorer prognoses. Overexpression of the MIR22HG gene in various types of NSCLC cells in culture suppressed cell proliferation and invasion and induced cell cycle arrest (i.e. blocked cell division) apparently by indirectly stimulating the production of p21, an inhibitor of cell replication.
- Thyroid cancer (TC): low levels of MIR22HG lncRNA were found in individuals with large tumor size, lymph node metastases, advanced clinical stage, shorter disease-free survival time, and poor survival times in TC. Reducing lncRNA levels using gene knockdown methods) suppressed the growth and invasiveness of TC cells in culture. Further studies suggested that these effects reflected high activity of the Hippo signaling pathway (A oncogenic pathway in TC). Increasing the levels of MIR22HR lncRNA in these cultured TC cells suppressed this pathway.
- Lung adenocarcinoma (LAC): The levels of MIR22HG RNA were lower in LAC tumors than normal lung tissues and lower levels of this lncRNA in LAC tumor tissue were associated with poor patient survival times.
- Non-small cell lung cancer (NSCLC): Low levels of MIR22HG lncRNA in NSCLC tissues were highly associated with poor patient survival times. Increasing MIR22HG lncRNA levels in cultured NSCLC cells reduced their proliferation and invasiveness. Further NSCLC cell culture studies suggested that high levels of MIR22HG lncRNA acted by suppressing the levels of p21.
- Hepatocellular carcinoma (HCC): low levels of MIR22HG lncRNA in HCC tumors were associated with short overall survival and poor disease-free survival times. The suppression of lncRNA production suppressed the growth, migration and invasion of cultured HCC cells, Further culture cell studies suggested this effect was due to the increases in NCOR2 levels that were associated with decreased lncRNA levels.
- cholangiocarcinoma (CAA): Low levels of MIR22HG lncRNA in CCA tumors were associated with an advanced clinical stage, larger tumor size, lymph node metastasis, and poor survival times.
- Colorectal cancer (CRC): Low levels of MIR22HG lncRNA were found in CRC tumors compared to normal colorectal tissue. Low tumor tissue levels of this lncRNA were significantly associated with shorter patient survival times. Suppressing the levels of MIR22HG lncRNA in CRC cells increased their survival and proliferation in culture and their ability to metastasize in an animal model. Further cell culture studies suggested that low levels of MiR22HF lncRNA promote epithelial-mesenchymal transition mechanisms (that have oncogenic actions) and thereby the aggressiveness of CRC.
- Gastric cancer (GC): Low levels of MIR22HG gene expression were associated with poor 5-year overall survival times in GC patients. Forced overexpression of MIR22HG lncRNA suppressed the proliferation, invasiveness, and migration of cultured GC cells. Further GC cell culture studies suggested that the suppressive effects of high MIR22HG lncRNA levels were to its indirect effects in regulating NOTCH2 (NOTCH2 appears involved in various types of cancer).
- Prostate cancer (PC): Low MIR22HG lncRNA levels were found in PC cases that had a more aggressive and poorer prognosis as judged by Gleason scores, a shorter progression-free survival time, and an early onset of disease recurrences.
- Cancer of the cervix (CC): Higher tumor tissue levels of MIR22HG lncRNA were associated with better clinical prognoses in CC. Forced overexpression of this lncRNA increased apoptosis (i.e. programmed cell death) and inhibited the invasiveness of several CC cell lines in culture. The cell culture studies suggested that increased lncRNA worked by suppressing the levels of a potential oncogene, IGF2BP2.

Some reports have suggested that the MIR22HG gene acts as a tumor suppressor based on examining the effects of MIR22HG lncRNA levels on cultured cancer cell function and/or and tumor spread in animal models and/or the levels of MIR22HR lncRNA in cancer versus normal nearby tissues. However, these reports did not determine the relationship of MIR22HG levels in patients' cancer tissues to their prognoses. These reports include those on: osteosarcoma, cancer of the uterus endometrium, and cancer of the larynx.

=== Tumor-promotion ===
- Glioblastoma multiforme (GBM): Increased levels of MIR22HG lncRNA were associated with poor survival in GBM patients. Blocking (by Gene knockdown methods) production of this lncRNA inhibited the proliferation and invasiveness of GBM cells in culture and the growth and invasiveness of these cells in a mouse mode. Further cell culture studies suggested that MIR22HG lncRNA promoted the malignancy of GBM by stimulating the Wnt/β-catenin signalling pathways.
- Ovarian cancer (OC): Increased levels of MIR22HG lncRNA (termed C17orf91 lncRNA in published studies) were associated with shorter progression-free survival times and tended to be associated with shorter survival times in patients with OC. Suppressing the expression of MIR22HG lncRNA by using shRNA impaired the migration, invasiveness, and viability of cultured OC cells. Elevated levels of MIR22HG lncRNA were associated with increased levels of the proto-oncogene (i.e. potentially cancer-causing gene) MYC in these culture studies.

The MIR22HG gene acted as a tumor promotor in squamous cell carcinoma of the esophagus based on studies showing that suppressing its levels in various types of cultured esophagus squamous-cell carcinoma cells inhibited their proliferation, invasiveness, and ability to form colonies and also increased their apoptosis. The cell culture studies suggested that decreasing MIR22HG lncRNA levels produced these results by decreasing the expression of STAT3, c-Myc, and PTK2.
