= RAB8B =

Protein-coding gene in the species Homo sapiens

Identifiers
- Aliases: RAB8B, member RAS oncogene family
- External IDs: OMIM: 613532; MGI: 2442982; GeneCards: RAB8B
Enzyme activity
EC #	BRENDA	ExPASy	KEGG	MetaCyc
3.6.5.2	↗	↗	↗	↗

Gene location (Human)
Chr.	Chromosome 15 (human)
Band	15q22.2	Start	63,189,560 bp
Band	15q22.2	End	63,267,776 bp

Gene location (Mouse)
Chr.	Chromosome 9 (mouse)
Band	9|9 C	Start	66,750,946 bp
Band	9|9 C	End	66,826,969 bp
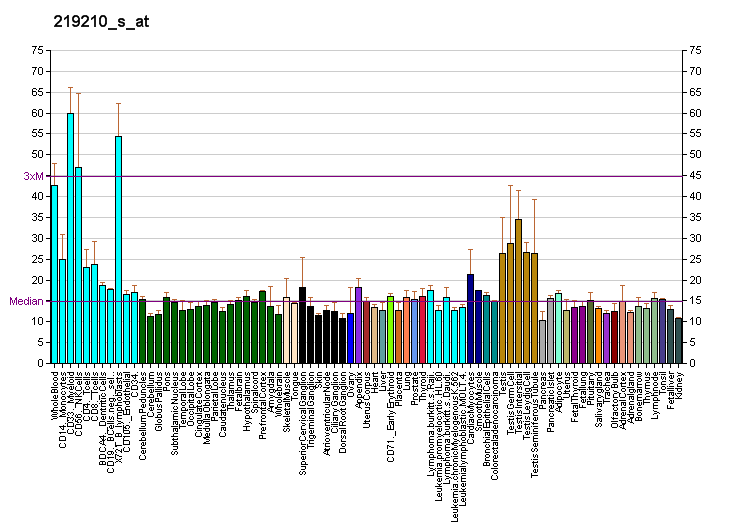
RNA expression pattern
Bgee	Human / Mouse (ortholog); Top expressed in: sperm; Achilles tendon; superficial temporal artery; secondary oocyte; trabecular bone; ventricular zone; germinal epithelium; monocyte; vena cava; ganglionic eminence / Top expressed in: stroma of bone marrow; mesenteric lymph nodes; blood; tibiofemoral joint; primitive streak; fetal liver hematopoietic progenitor cell; granulocyte; gastrula; medial ganglionic eminence; calvaria; More reference expression data
BioGPS	More reference expression data
Gene ontology
Molecular function	protein binding; nucleotide binding; signaling receptor binding; GTP binding; TPR domain binding; GDP binding; GTPase activity
Cellular component	mitochondrion; peroxisomal membrane; cell tip; membrane; phagocytic vesicle membrane; perinuclear region of cytoplasm; cytoplasmic vesicle; phagocytic vesicle; extracellular exosome; nucleoplasm; nuclear body; intracellular membrane-bounded organelle; recycling endosome membrane; endosome; plasma membrane; synaptic vesicle; secretory granule membrane; trans-Golgi network transport vesicle; presynapse
Biological process	vesicle docking involved in exocytosis; protein secretion; positive regulation of cell projection organization; protein import into peroxisome membrane; antigen processing and presentation; adherens junction organization; positive regulation of corticotropin secretion; protein transport; cilium assembly; protein localization to plasma membrane; regulation of exocytosis; transport; intracellular protein transport; Rab protein signal transduction; cellular response to insulin stimulus; Golgi vesicle fusion to target membrane
Sources:Amigo / QuickGO
Orthologs
Databases	NCBI: entry; OMA: entry
Species	Human	Mouse
Entrez	51762	235442
Ensembl	ENSG00000166128	ENSMUSG00000036943
UniProt	Q92930	P61028
RefSeq (mRNA)	NM_016530	NM_173413
RefSeq (protein)	NP_057614	NP_775589
Location (UCSC)	Chr 15: 63.19 – 63.27 Mb	Chr 9: 66.75 – 66.83 Mb
PubMed search
- Wikidata
View/Edit Human	View/Edit Mouse

Ras-related protein Rab-8B is a protein that in humans is encoded by the RAB8B gene.
