= RAB6B =

Protein-coding gene in the species Homo sapiens

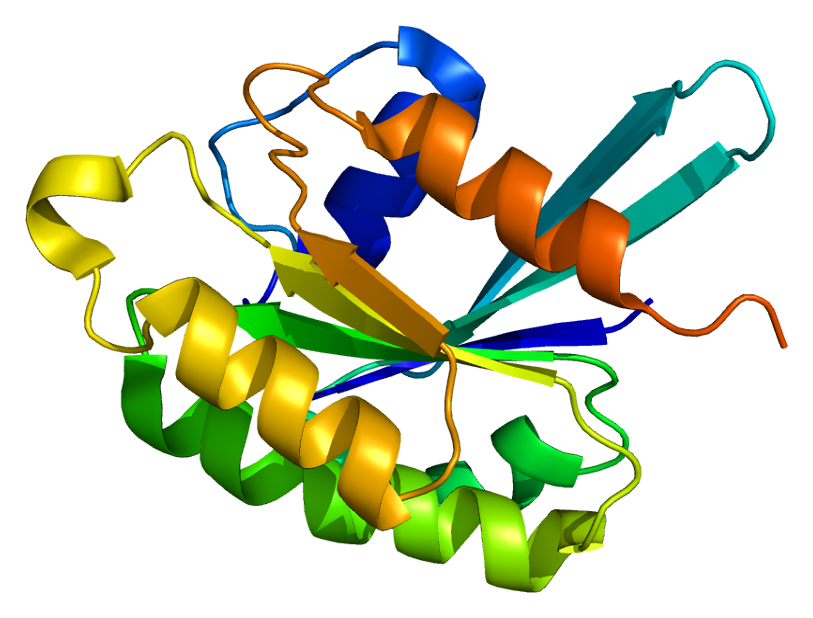

Identifiers
- Aliases: RAB6B, member RAS oncogene family
- External IDs: OMIM: 615852; MGI: 107283; GeneCards: RAB6B
Available structures
PDB	Ortholog search: PDBe RCSB
PDB	List of PDB id codes 2E9S, 2FE4, 2FFQ
Enzyme activity
EC #	BRENDA	ExPASy	KEGG	MetaCyc
3.6.5.2	↗	↗	↗	↗

Gene location (Human)
Chr.	Chromosome 3 (human)
Band	3q22.1	Start	133,824,235 bp
Band	3q22.1	End	133,895,882 bp

Gene location (Mouse)
Chr.	Chromosome 9 (mouse)
Band	9 F1|9 54.88 cM	Start	102,988,986 bp
Band	9 F1|9 54.88 cM	End	103,062,475 bp
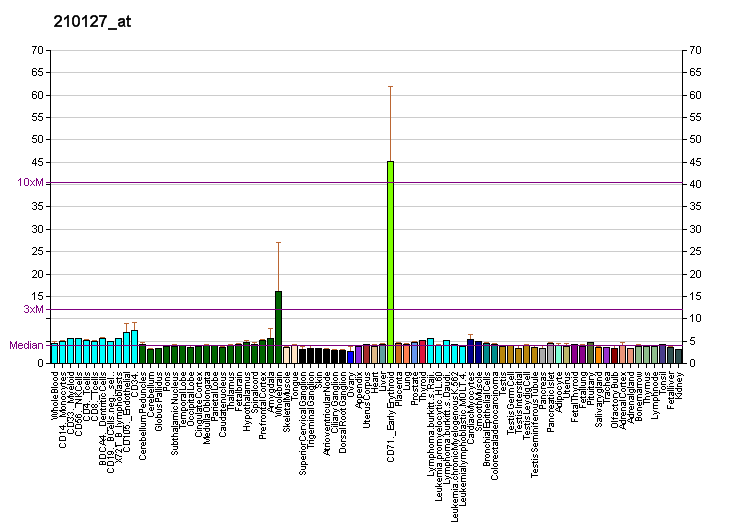

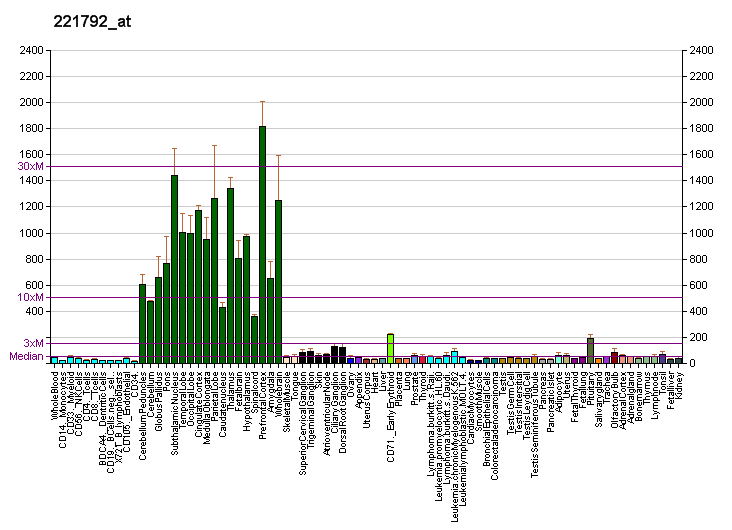
RNA expression pattern
Bgee	Human / Mouse (ortholog); Top expressed in: lateral nuclear group of thalamus; frontal pole; Brodmann area 10; middle temporal gyrus; pons; pars compacta; Brodmann area 46; orbitofrontal cortex; superior frontal gyrus; superior vestibular nucleus / Top expressed in: substantia nigra; trigeminal ganglion; medial dorsal nucleus; piriform cortex; prefrontal cortex; primary motor cortex; medial geniculate nucleus; pontine nuclei; lateral geniculate nucleus; temporal lobe; More reference expression data
BioGPS	More reference expression data
Gene ontology
Molecular function	nucleotide binding; GTP binding; myosin V binding; protein binding; GTPase activity
Cellular component	Golgi membrane; membrane; cytoplasmic vesicle; endoplasmic reticulum-Golgi intermediate compartment; cytosol; Golgi apparatus; presynapse; intracellular anatomical structure
Biological process	retrograde vesicle-mediated transport, Golgi to endoplasmic reticulum; protein transport; intra-Golgi vesicle-mediated transport; retrograde transport, endosome to Golgi; vesicle-mediated transport; intracellular protein transport; Rab protein signal transduction; small GTPase mediated signal transduction
Sources:Amigo / QuickGO
Orthologs
Databases	NCBI: entry; OMA: entry
Species	Human	Mouse
Entrez	51560	270192
Ensembl	ENSG00000154917	ENSMUSG00000032549
UniProt	Q9NRW1	P61294
RefSeq (mRNA)	NM_016577; NM_001363953	NM_173781
RefSeq (protein)	NP_057661; NP_001350882	NP_776142
Location (UCSC)	Chr 3: 133.82 – 133.9 Mb	Chr 9: 102.99 – 103.06 Mb
PubMed search
- Wikidata
View/Edit Human	View/Edit Mouse

Ras-related protein Rab-6B is a protein that in humans is encoded by the RAB6B gene.
