= RAB6C =

Protein-coding gene in the species Homo sapiens

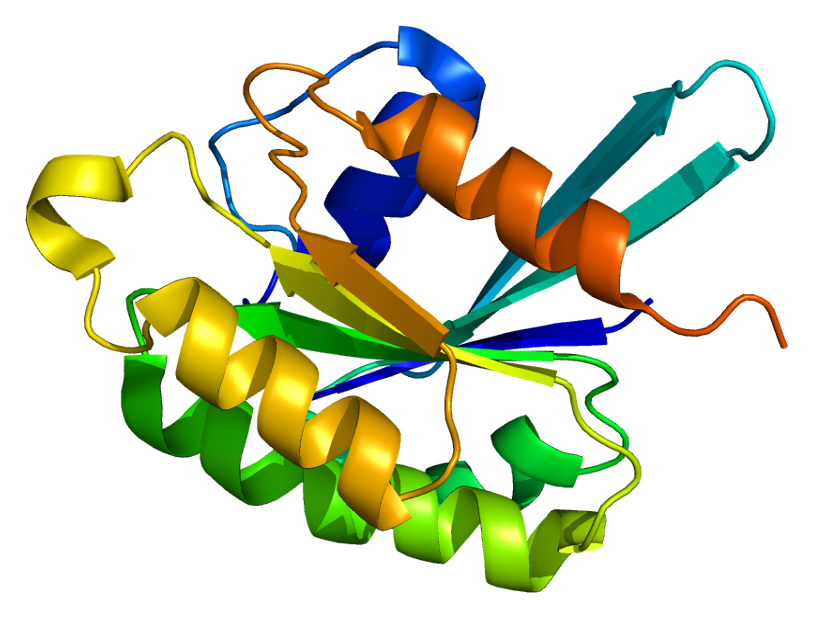

Identifiers
- Aliases: RAB6C, WTH3, member RAS oncogene family
- External IDs: OMIM: 612909; GeneCards: RAB6C
Enzyme activity
EC #	BRENDA	ExPASy	KEGG	MetaCyc
3.6.5.2	↗	↗	↗	↗

Gene location (Human)
Chr.	Chromosome 2 (human)
Band	2q21.1	Start	129,979,666 bp
Band	2q21.1	End	129,982,738 bp
RNA expression pattern
Bgee	Human / Mouse (ortholog); Top expressed in: testicle; endometrium; primary visual cortex; superior frontal gyrus; prefrontal cortex; hippocampus proper; Brodmann area 9; corpus callosum; putamen; gonad / n/a; More reference expression data
BioGPS	n/a
Gene ontology
Molecular function	nucleotide binding; GTP binding; GTPase activity
Cellular component	cytoplasm; centrosome; intracellular anatomical structure; cytoskeleton; nucleus; microtubule organizing center; cytosol; Golgi apparatus
Biological process	regulation of centrosome duplication; retrograde transport, endosome to Golgi; intra-Golgi vesicle-mediated transport; retrograde vesicle-mediated transport, Golgi to endoplasmic reticulum; mitotic cell cycle; small GTPase mediated signal transduction; intracellular protein transport; Rab protein signal transduction
Sources:Amigo / QuickGO
Orthologs
Databases	NCBI: entry; OMA: entry
Species	Human	Mouse
Entrez	84084	n/a
Ensembl	ENSG00000222014	n/a
UniProt	Q9H0N0	n/a
RefSeq (mRNA)	NM_032144	n/a
RefSeq (protein)	NP_115520	n/a
Location (UCSC)	Chr 2: 129.98 – 129.98 Mb	n/a
PubMed search		n/a
- Wikidata
View/Edit Human

Ras-related protein Rab-6C is a protein that in humans is encoded by the RAB6C gene.
