= Rab (G-protein) =

Family of GTP-binding proteins

The Rab family of proteins is a member of the Ras superfamily of small G proteins. Approximately 70 types of Rabs have now been identified in humans. Rab proteins generally possess a GTPase fold, which consists of a six-stranded beta sheet which is flanked by five alpha helices.

Rab GTPases regulate many steps of membrane trafficking, including vesicle formation, vesicle movement along actin and tubulin networks, and membrane fusion. These processes make up the route through which cell surface proteins are trafficked from the Golgi to the plasma membrane and are recycled. Surface protein recycling returns proteins to the surface whose function involves carrying another protein or substance inside the cell, such as the transferrin receptor, or serves as a means of regulating the number of a certain type of protein molecules on the surface.

== Function ==
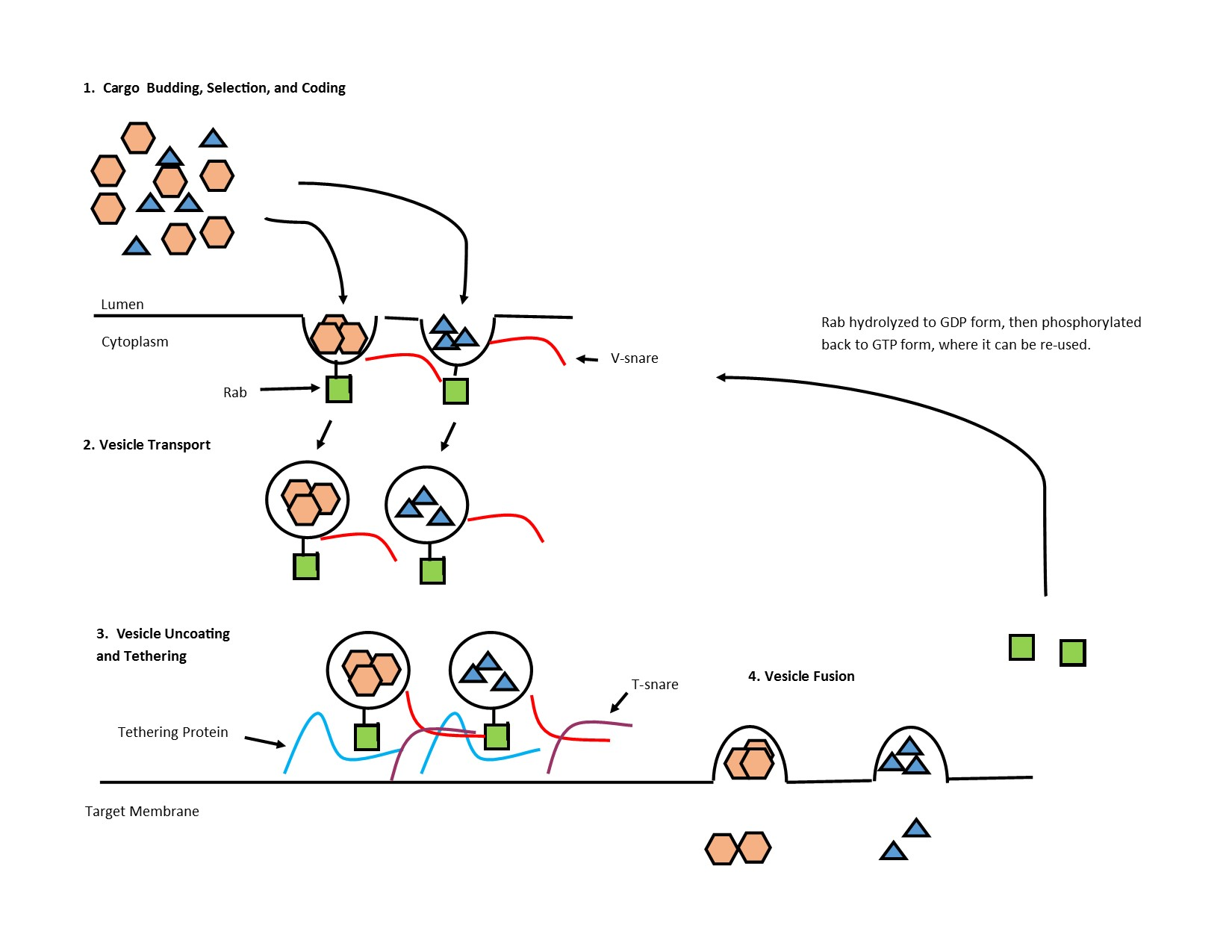
The four steps of Rab protein vesicle transport (listed in text)

Rab proteins are peripheral membrane proteins, anchored to a membrane via a lipid group covalently linked to an amino acid. Specifically, Rabs are anchored via prenyl groups on two cysteines in the C-terminus. Rab escort proteins (REPs) deliver newly synthesized and prenylated Rab to its destination membrane by binding the hydrophobic, insoluble prenyl groups and carrying Rab through the cytoplasm. The lipid prenyl groups can then insert into the membrane, anchoring Rab at the cytoplasmic face of a vesicle or the plasma membrane. Because Rab proteins are anchored to the membrane through a flexible C-terminal region, they can be thought of as a 'balloon on a string'.

Rabs switch between two conformations, an inactive form bound to GDP (guanosine diphosphate), and an active form bound to GTP (guanosine triphosphate). A guanine nucleotide exchange factor (GEF) catalyzes the conversion from GDP-bound to GTP-bound form, thereby activating the Rab. The inherent GTP hydrolysis of Rabs can be enhanced by a GTPase-activating protein (GAP) leading to Rab inactivation. REPs carry only the GDP-bound form of Rab, and Rab effectors, proteins with which Rab interacts and through which it functions, only bind the GTP-bound form of Rab. Rab effectors are very heterogeneous, and each Rab isoform has many effectors through which it carries out multiple functions. The specific binding of the effector to the Rab protein allows the Rab protein to be effective, and conversely, the conformation shift of the Rab protein to the inactive state leads to effector dissociation from the Rab protein.

Effector proteins have one of four different functions.

1. Cargo budding, selection, and coating
2. Vesicle transport
3. Vesicle uncoating and tethering
4. Vesicle fusion

After membrane fusion and effector dissociation, Rab is recycled back to its membrane of origin. A GDP dissociation inhibitor (GDI) binds the prenyl groups of the inactive, GDP-bound form of Rab, inhibits the exchange of GDP for GTP (which would reactivate the Rab) and delivers Rab to its original membrane.

== Clinical significance ==
Rab proteins and their functions are essential to proper organelle function, and as such, when any deviation is introduced to the Rab protein cycle, physiological disease states ensue.

=== Choroideremia ===
Choroideremia is caused by a loss-of-function mutation in the CHM gene which codes for Rab escort protein (REP-1). REP-1 and REP-2 (a REP-1 like protein) both help with the prenylation and transport of Rab proteins. Rab27 has been found to preferentially depend on REP-1 for prenylation, which could be the underlying cause of choroideremia.

=== Intellectual disability ===
Mutations in the GDI1 gene, which encodes a guanosine nucleotide dissociation inhibitor, have been shown to lead to X-linked nonspecific intellectual disability. In a study done on mice, carriers for a deletion of the GDI1 gene have shown marked abnormalities in short-term memory formation and social interaction patterns. It is noted that the social and behavioral patterns exhibited in mice that are carriers of the GDI1 protein are similar to those observed in humans with the same deletion. The loss of the GDI1 gene has been shown through brain extracts of the mutant mice to lead to the accumulation of the Rab4 and Rab5 proteins, thus inhibiting their function.

=== Cancer/carcinogenesis ===
Evidence shows that overexpression of Rab GTPases have a striking relationship with carcinogenesis, such as in prostate cancer. There are many mechanisms by which Rab protein dysfunction has been shown to cause cancer. To name a few, elevated expression of the oncogenic Rab1, along with Rab1A proteins, promote the growth of tumors, often with a poor prognosis. The overexpression of Rab23 has been linked to gastric cancer. In addition to directly causing cancer, dysregulation of Rab proteins has also been linked to progression of already existent tumors, and contributing to their malignancy.

=== Parkinson's disease ===
Mutations of the Rab39b protein have been linked to X-linked intellectual disability and also to a rare form of Parkinson's disease.

== Types of Rab proteins ==
There are approximately 70 different Rabs that have been identified in humans thus far. They are mostly involved in vesicle trafficking. Their complexity can be understood if thought of as address labels for vesicle trafficking, defining the identity and routing of vesicles. Shown in parentheses are the equivalent names in the model organisms Saccharomyces cerevisiae and Aspergillus nidulans.

Name	Subcellular location
RAB1 (Ypt1, RabO)	Golgi complex
RAB2A	ER, cis-Golgi network
RAB2B	
RAB3A	Secretory and synaptic vesicles
RAB3B	
RAB4A	Recycling endosomes
RAB4B	
RAB5A	Clathrin-coated vesicles, plasma membranes
RAB5C (Vps21, RabB)	Early endosomes
RAB6A (Ypt6, RabC)	Golgi and trans-Golgi network
RAB6B	
RAB6C	
RAB6D	
RAB7 (Ypt7, RabS)	Late endosomes, vacuoles
RAB8A	Basolateral secretory vesicles
RAB8B	
RAB9A	Late endosome, trans-golgi network
RAB9B	
RAB11A (Ypt31, RabE)	Recycling endosomes, post-Golgi exocytic carriers
RAB13	Golgi, endosome, cytosol, plasma membrane
RAB14	Early endosomes
RAB17	Endosome
RAB18	Lipid droplets, golgi, endoplasmic reticulum
RAB20	Golgi, mitochondria, early phagosome, early endosome
RAB23	Plasma membrane
RAB25	Small-scale transport, promoter for tumor development
RAB27	Extracellular vesicles, endosome
RAB29	Recruits LRRK2 to TGN
RAB39A	Binds Caspase-1 in inflammasome

=== Other Rab proteins ===
- RABIF
