= USP6 =

Protein-coding gene in the species Homo sapiens

Identifiers
- Aliases: USP6, HRP1, TRE17, TRE2, TRESMCR, Tre-2, USP6-short, ubiquitin specific peptidase 6
- External IDs: OMIM: 604334; GeneCards: USP6
Enzyme activity
EC #	BRENDA	ExPASy	KEGG	MetaCyc
3.4.19.12	↗	↗	↗	↗

Gene location (Human)
Chr.	Chromosome 17 (human)
Band	17p13.2	Start	5,116,032 bp
Band	17p13.2	End	5,175,034 bp
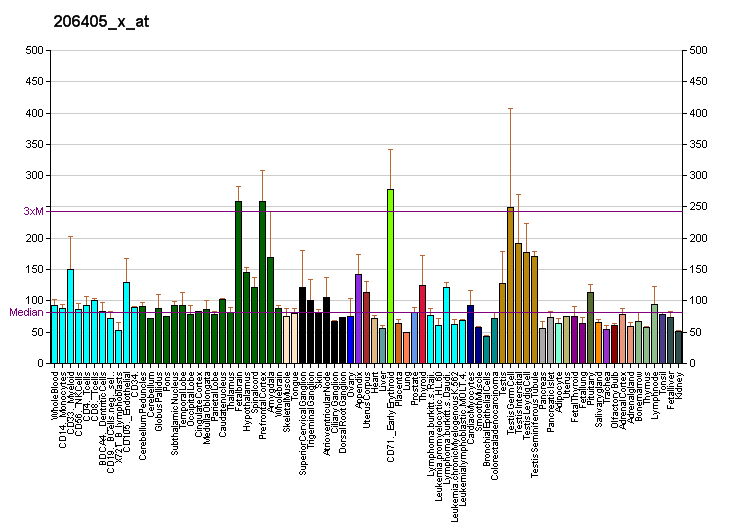
RNA expression pattern
Bgee	Human / Mouse (ortholog); Top expressed in: Brodmann area 23; sperm; dorsal motor nucleus of vagus nerve; Region I of hippocampus proper; inferior olivary nucleus; glutes; Skeletal muscle tissue of biceps brachii; middle temporal gyrus; subthalamic nucleus; endothelial cell / n/a; More reference expression data
BioGPS	More reference expression data
Gene ontology
Molecular function	thiol-dependent deubiquitinase; peptidase activity; cysteine-type endopeptidase activity; cysteine-type peptidase activity; protein binding; hydrolase activity; nucleic acid binding; GTPase activator activity; calmodulin binding
Cellular component	cytoplasm; recycling endosome; endosome; plasma membrane; lysosome; membrane
Biological process	protein deubiquitination; regulation of vesicle-mediated transport; ubiquitin-dependent protein catabolic process; proteolysis; intracellular protein transport; regulation of vesicle fusion; activation of GTPase activity
Sources:Amigo / QuickGO
Orthologs
Databases	NCBI: entry; OMA: entry
Species	Human	Mouse
Entrez	9098	n/a
Ensembl	ENSG00000129204	n/a
UniProt	P35125	n/a
RefSeq (mRNA)	NM_001304284; NM_004505; NM_005152	n/a
RefSeq (protein)	NP_001291213; NP_004496	n/a
Location (UCSC)	Chr 17: 5.12 – 5.18 Mb	n/a
PubMed search		n/a
- Wikidata
View/Edit Human

Ubiquitin carboxyl-terminal hydrolase 6 (USB6), also termed TRE17 and Tre-2, is a deubiquitinating enzyme that in humans is encoded by the hominid (i.e. found only in primates) USP6 gene located at band 13.2 on the short (i.e. "p") arm of chromosome 17 (notated as 17p13.2). Deubiquitinating enzymes (DUBs) are enzymes that act within cells to remove ubiquitins from various functionally important proteins. Ubiquitin enzymes add ubiquitin to these proteins and thereby regulate their cellular location, alter their activity, and/or promote their degradation. By deubiquitinating these proteins, DUBs counter the effects of the ubiquinating enzymes and contribute to regulating the actions of the targeted proteins. In normal adult tissues, USP6 is highly expressed in testicle tissue, modestly expressed in ovarian tissue, and absent or minimally expressed in other tissues. It is also highly expressed in fetal brain tissue. The specific functions of USP6 are poorly defined primarily because its presence is restricted to primates: there are no available animal models to determine the effects of its deletion, although some studies suggest that UPSP6 contributes to normal brain development. In all events, USP6 has gained wide interest because of its abnormally increased expression by the neoplastic cells in various tumors derived from mesenchymal tissue.

The USP6 gene associated with tumors is part of a fusion gene. Fusion genes are abnormal and potentially tumor-inducing genes formed by mergers between parts of two different genes as a result of large scale gene mutations such as chromosomal translocations, interstitial deletions, or inversions. For example, the USP6-COL1A1 fusion gene is formed by a translocation between part of the USP6 gene located at band 13.2 on the p arm of chromosome 17 and the COL1A1 gene located at band 21.33 on the q arm of this same chromosome. The USP6 gene has been documented to fuse with any one of scores of other genes and in doing so (as tested in many cases) create a fusion gene that is overproduced and contains high levels of deubiquitinating activity. Studies suggest that USP6-containing fusion genes cause or at least contribute to tumor development by inappropriately activating multiple cell signaling pathways including the Wnt signaling pathway, one of the JAK-STAT signaling pathways (i.e. the Jak1-STAT3 pathway), the c-Jun signaling pathway, and the NF-κB signaling pathway. All of these pathways, when inappropriately activated, have been implicated in promoting the development of tumors and cancers. The World Health Organization, 2021, classification of Tumors of Soft Tissue suggests that USP6-containing fusion protein-associated tumors are typically benign and usually self-limited in their growth. Furthermore, high levels of USP6 activity may act to suppress rather than promote tumor development in Ewing sarcoma, a tumor which has USP-containing fusion genes in ~1/3 of cases.

Tumor types that are associated with USP6-containing fusion genes and appear to promote their development and/or growth include:

- Aneurysmal bone cysts: Found in 59% to 75%
- Fibroma of tendon sheaths: Found in 6 out of 9 (67%) tested cases. of cases.
- Giant cell reparative granuloma (GCRG): GCRG are regarded as variants of aneurysmal bone cysts that occur in sites other than the jaw. An USP6-containing fusion gene was found in 8 of 9 (89%) GCRG tumors that were located in the hands or feet.
- Nodular fasciitis: Found in close to 90% of all cases.
- Myositis ossificans and fibro-osseous pseudotumor of digits: The World Health Organization, 2021, classified these two tumors as a single entity in the family of Fibroblastic and myofibroblastic tumors. USP6-containing fusion genes has been found in 8 of 9 (89%) tested cases of these tumors.
