= RAB2A =

Protein-coding gene in the species Homo sapiens

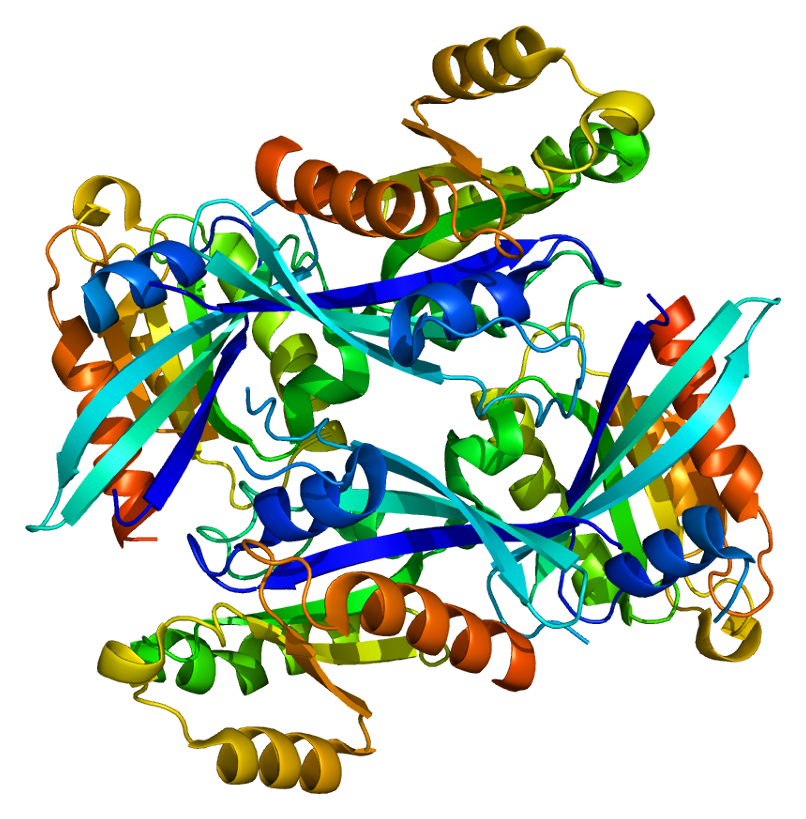

Identifiers
- Aliases: RAB2A, LHX, RAB2, member RAS oncogene family
- External IDs: OMIM: 179509; MGI: 1928750; GeneCards: RAB2A
Available structures
PDB	Ortholog search: PDBe RCSB
PDB	List of PDB id codes 1Z0A
Enzyme activity
EC #	BRENDA	ExPASy	KEGG	MetaCyc
3.6.5.2	↗	↗	↗	↗

Gene location (Human)
Chr.	Chromosome 8 (human)
Band	8q12.1-q12.2	Start	60,516,936 bp
Band	8q12.1-q12.2	End	60,623,644 bp

Gene location (Mouse)
Chr.	Chromosome 4 (mouse)
Band	4|4 A1	Start	8,535,644 bp
Band	4|4 A1	End	8,607,778 bp
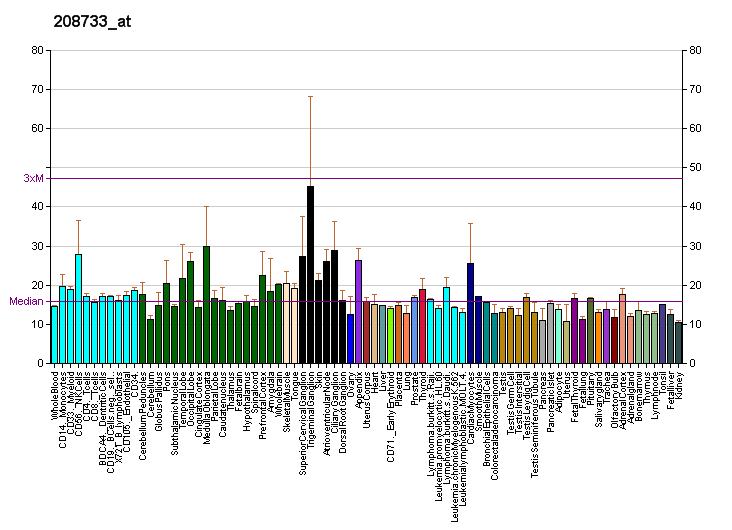

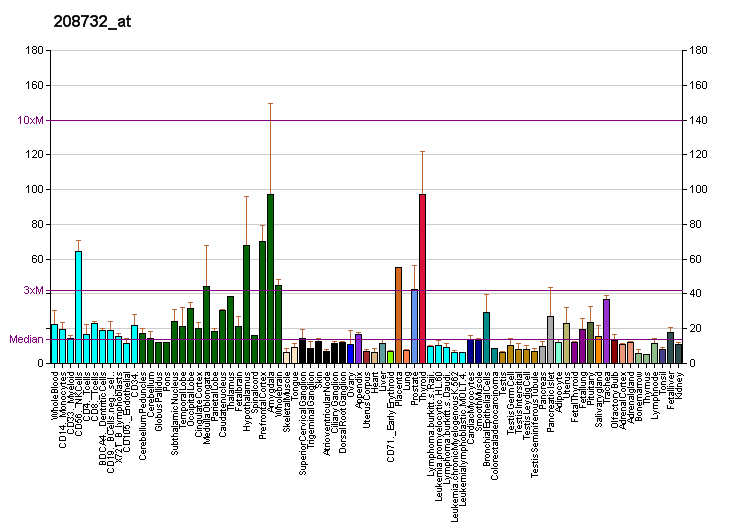

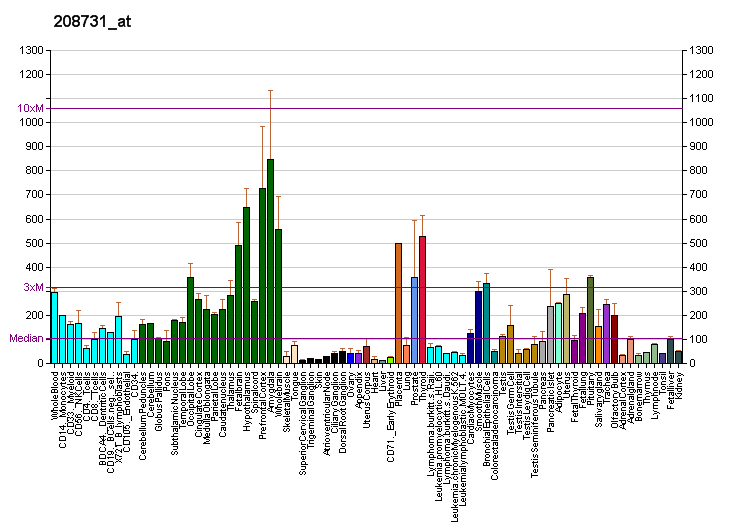
RNA expression pattern
Bgee	Human / Mouse (ortholog); Top expressed in: tendon of biceps brachii; parotid gland; pons; right ventricle; postcentral gyrus; islet of Langerhans; Skeletal muscle tissue of rectus abdominis; entorhinal cortex; superior frontal gyrus; stromal cell of endometrium / Top expressed in: dorsomedial hypothalamic nucleus; ventral tegmental area; piriform cortex; paraventricular nucleus of hypothalamus; habenula; cerebellar vermis; Region I of hippocampus proper; ventromedial nucleus; superior colliculus; mammillary body; More reference expression data
BioGPS	More reference expression data
Gene ontology
Molecular function	nucleotide binding; GDP binding; GTP binding; protein binding; GTPase activity
Cellular component	endoplasmic reticulum membrane; membrane; melanosome; Golgi membrane; lysosomal membrane; endoplasmic reticulum; endoplasmic reticulum-Golgi intermediate compartment membrane; extracellular exosome; nucleus; cytosol; Golgi apparatus; intracellular anatomical structure
Biological process	Golgi organization; endoplasmic reticulum to Golgi vesicle-mediated transport; protein transport; vesicle-mediated transport; post-translational protein modification; transport; intracellular protein transport; Rab protein signal transduction; small GTPase mediated signal transduction
Sources:Amigo / QuickGO
Orthologs
Databases	NCBI: entry; OMA: entry
Species	Human	Mouse
Entrez	5862	59021
Ensembl	ENSG00000104388	ENSMUSG00000047187
UniProt	P61019	P53994
RefSeq (mRNA)	NM_002865; NM_001242644	NM_021518
RefSeq (protein)	NP_001229573; NP_002856	NP_067493
Location (UCSC)	Chr 8: 60.52 – 60.62 Mb	Chr 4: 8.54 – 8.61 Mb
PubMed search
- Wikidata
View/Edit Human	View/Edit Mouse

Ras-related protein Rab-2A is a protein that in humans is encoded by the RAB2A gene.

== Function ==
Members of the Rab protein family are nontransforming monomeric GTP-binding proteins of the Ras superfamily that contain 4 highly conserved regions involved in GTP binding and hydrolysis. Rabs are prenylated, membrane-bound proteins involved in vesicular fusion and trafficking. The mammalian RAB proteins show striking similarities to the S. cerevisiae YPT1 and SEC4 proteins, Ras-related GTP-binding proteins involved in the regulation of secretion.[supplied by OMIM]

== Interactions ==
RAB2A has been shown to interact with GOLGA2.
