= RASSF9 =

Protein-coding gene in the species Homo sapiens

Identifiers
- Aliases: RASSF9, P-CIP1, PAMCI, PCIP1, Ras association domain family member 9
- External IDs: OMIM: 610383; MGI: 2384307; GeneCards: RASSF9

Gene location (Human)
Chr.	Chromosome 12 (human)
Band	12q21.31	Start	85,800,703 bp
Band	12q21.31	End	85,836,409 bp

Gene location (Mouse)
Chr.	Chromosome 10 (mouse)
Band	10|10 D1	Start	102,348,083 bp
Band	10|10 D1	End	102,385,597 bp
RNA expression pattern
Bgee	Human / Mouse (ortholog); Top expressed in: mucosa of paranasal sinus; bronchial epithelial cell; germinal epithelium; olfactory zone of nasal mucosa; visceral pleura; parietal pleura; palpebral conjunctiva; epithelium of nasopharynx; gonad; testicle / Top expressed in: lumbar spinal ganglion; spermatid; endothelium of vein; tooth; molar; urethra; endothelium of artery; vasa recta; ascending aorta; aortic valve; More reference expression data
BioGPS	n/a
Gene ontology
Molecular function	protein binding; transporter activity
Cellular component	cytosol; endosome; trans-Golgi network transport vesicle membrane; extracellular exosome; recycling endosome
Biological process	protein targeting; signal transduction; endosomal transport; intracellular transport
Sources:Amigo / QuickGO
Orthologs
Databases	NCBI: entry; OMA: entry
Species	Human	Mouse
Entrez	9182	237504
Ensembl	ENSG00000198774	ENSMUSG00000044921
UniProt	O75901	Q8K342
RefSeq (mRNA)	NM_005447	NM_146240
RefSeq (protein)	NP_005438	NP_666352
Location (UCSC)	Chr 12: 85.8 – 85.84 Mb	Chr 10: 102.35 – 102.39 Mb
PubMed search
- Wikidata
View/Edit Human	View/Edit Mouse

Ras association domain-containing protein 9 (RASSF9), also known as PAM COOH-terminal interactor protein 1 (PCIP1) or peptidylglycine alpha-amidating monooxygenase COOH-terminal interactor (PAMCI) is a protein that in humans is encoded by the RASSF9 gene.

== Function ==
RASSF9 the N-terminal RASSF family member Ras association (RalGDS/AF-6) domain family (N-terminal) member 9 12q21.31, is one of two new wild type RASSF9 and RASSF10 proteins. Three proteins that interact with a fragment of the PAM cytosolic domain containing signaling switch I and II the RA1 and RA2ras complex. RASSF7, the first member of the N-terminal RASSF family is required for mitosis. RASSF9 is recently found to be involved in regulation of epidermal homeostasis.

== Regulation ==
The mutant proregion encoding PAM COOH-terminal interactor protein-1 (P-CIP1) is comparable to that of human band 4.1-like TF (blood plasma protein) as a recycling endosomal pathway in microtubule locations, does NOT bind RasGTP. Specificity of interaction may all be related to microtubule locations of the endosomal-lysosomal system localized within the centrosome with Transferrin and different Ras proteins or with that one (N-Ras), but on the other hand, it interacts with three (Ha-Ras, Ki-Ras, and Rap) residues function, blocked by a mutation that affects Ras effector function is the critical product of the t (6:11) abnormality associated with some human leukemias. Phosphatidylinositol-3-kinase make contacts with both (6:11) switch I and II regions of ras and yeast adenylyl cyclase molecules carrying these mutations are rendered unactivatable by Ras in vitro. Ras-interacting residues, are appreciably different from that of RalGDS-RBD through their C-terminal Ras-binding domains (RBD). Such outliers as afadin/AF-6 and Rin1 were found to inhibit the binding of Raf to Ras. Adenylyl cyclase molecules carrying these mutations are rendered unactivatable by Ras in vitro with the Ras-associating domain-RA, not all RA domains bind RasGTP it is a primary Ras-binding site.

== Interactions ==
- PAM Peptidyl-glycine alpha-amidating monooxygenase precursor (PAM)
- RASSF7 Ras association domain-containing protein 7 (HRAS1-related cluster protein 1)
- BLOC1S2 Biogenesis of lysosome-related organelles complex-1 subunit 2 (BLOC subunit 2)
- TF Serotransferrin precursor (Transferrin) (Beta-1-metal- binding globulin)
- RAB11A Ras-related protein Rab-11A
