= MRAS =

Protein

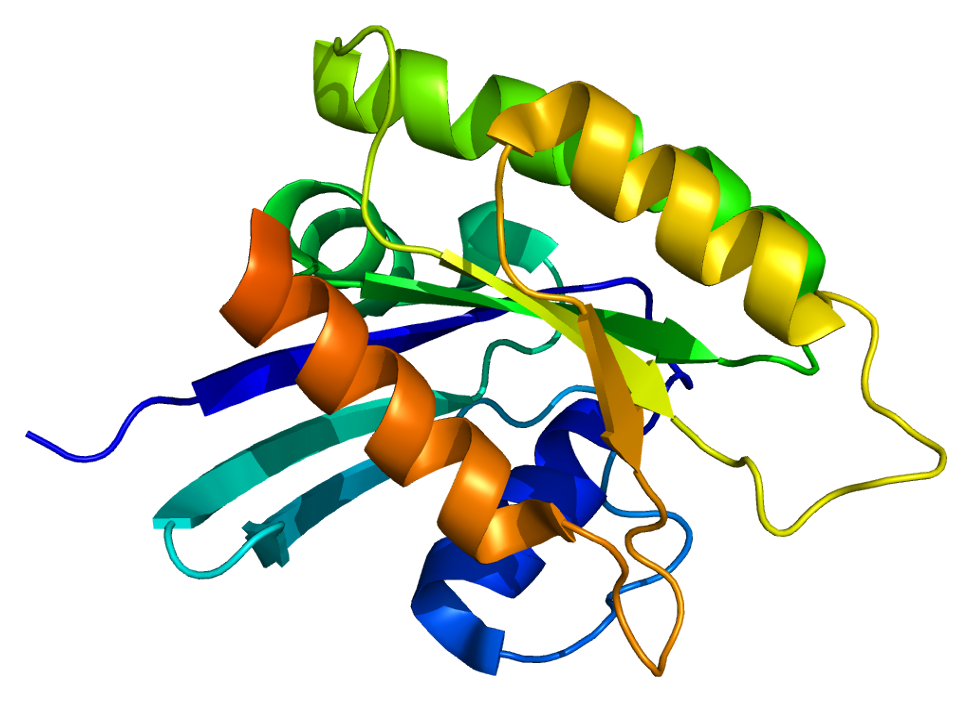

Identifiers
- Aliases: MRAS, M-RAs, R-RAS3, RRAS3, muscle RAS oncogene homolog, NS11
- External IDs: OMIM: 608435; MGI: 1100856; GeneCards: MRAS
Enzyme activity
| EC # | BRENDA | ExPASy | KEGG | MetaCyc |
|---|---|---|---|---|
| 3.6.5.2 | ↗ | ↗ | ↗ | ↗ |

Gene location (Human)
| Chr. | Chromosome 3 (human) |
| Band | 3q22.3 | Start | 138,347,648 bp |
| Band | 3q22.3 | End | 138,405,534 bp |

Gene location (Mouse)
| Chr. | Chromosome 9 (mouse) |
| Band | 9|9 E3.3 | Start | 99,267,473 bp |
| Band | 9|9 E3.3 | End | 99,319,434 bp |
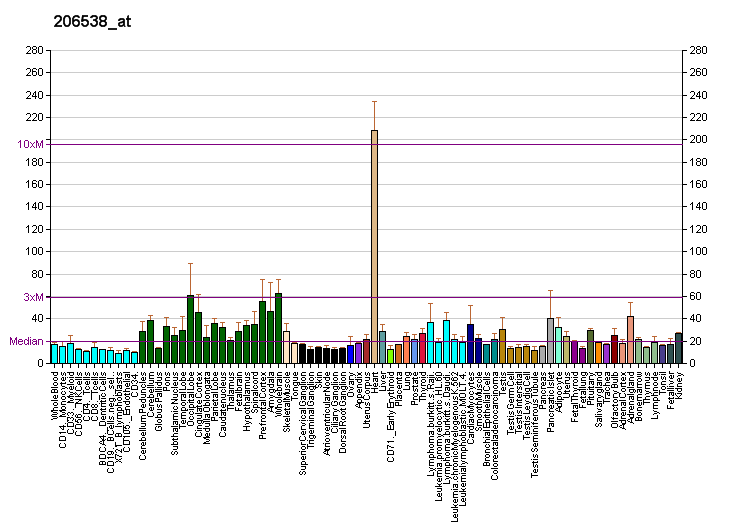
RNA expression pattern
| Bgee | Human / Mouse (ortholog); Top expressed in: external globus pallidus; internal globus pallidus; nucleus accumbens; right auricle of heart; tibial nerve; left ventricle; trigeminal ganglion; right frontal lobe; pars reticulata; middle temporal gyrus / Top expressed in: dentate gyrus of hippocampal formation granule cell; subiculum; superior frontal gyrus; primary visual cortex; olfactory tubercle; neural layer of retina; genital tubercle; yolk sac; primary motor cortex; globus pallidus; More reference expression data |
| BioGPS | More reference expression data |
Gene ontology
| Molecular function | nucleotide binding; GTP-dependent protein binding; GTP binding; protein binding; GTPase activity; GDP binding |
| Cellular component | plasma membrane; membrane; intracellular anatomical structure |
| Biological process | multicellular organism development; muscle organ development; Ras protein signal transduction; actin cytoskeleton organization; signal transduction; cellular response to leukemia inhibitory factor |
Sources:Amigo / QuickGO
Orthologs
| Databases | NCBI: entry; OMA: entry |
| Species | Human | Mouse |
| Entrez | 22808 | 17532 |
| Ensembl | ENSG00000158186 | ENSMUSG00000032470 |
| UniProt | O14807 | O08989 |
| RefSeq (mRNA) | NM_001085049; NM_001252090; NM_001252091; NM_001252092; NM_001252093 NM_012219 | NM_008624 |
| RefSeq (protein) | NP_001078518; NP_001239019; NP_001239020; NP_001239021; NP_001239022 NP_036351 | NP_032650 |
| Location (UCSC) | Chr 3: 138.35 – 138.41 Mb | Chr 9: 99.27 – 99.32 Mb |
| PubMed search |
- Wikidata
| View/Edit Human | View/Edit Mouse |

Ras-related protein M-Ras, also known as muscle RAS oncogene homolog and R-Ras3, is a protein that in humans is encoded by the MRAS gene on chromosome 3. It is ubiquitously expressed in many tissues and cell types. This protein functions as a signal transducer for a wide variety of signaling pathways, including those promoting neural and bone formation as well as tumor growth. The MRAS gene also contains one of 27 SNPs associated with increased risk of coronary artery disease.

== Structure ==
=== Gene ===
The MRAS gene resides on chromosome 3 at the band 3q22.3 and includes 10 exons. This gene produces 2 isoforms through alternative splicing.

=== Protein ===
M-Ras is a member of the small GTPase superfamily under the Ras family, which also includes Rap1, Rap2, R-Ras, and R-Ras2 (TC21). This protein spans a length of 209 residues. Its N-terminal amino acid sequence shares 60-75% identity with that in the Ras protein while its effector region is identical with that in Ras. M-Ras shares a similar structure with H-Ras and Rap2A with the exception of its switch 1 conformation when bound to guanosine 5'-(beta,gamma-imido)triphosphate (Gpp(NH)p). Of the two states M-Ras can switch between, M-Ras is predominantly found in its state 1 conformation, which does not bind Ras effectors.

== Function ==
The MRAS gene is expressed specifically in brain, heart, myoblasts, myotubes, fibroblasts, skeletal muscles, and uterus, suggesting a specific role of M-Ras in these tissue and cells. M-Ras is involved in many biological processes by activating a wide variety of proteins. For instance, it is activated by Ras guanine nucleotide exchange factors and can bind/activate some Ras protein effectors. M-Ras also weakly stimulates the mitogen-activated protein kinase (MAPK) activity and ERK2 activity, but modestly stimulates trans-activation from different nuclear response elements which bind transcription factors, such as SRF, ETS/TCF, Jun/Fos, and NF- kB/Rel. M-Ras has been found to induce Akt kinase activity in the PI3-K pathway, and it may play a role in cell survival of neural-derived cells. Moreover, M-Ras plays a crucial role in the downregulation of OCT4 and NANOG protein levels upon differentiation and has been demonstrated to modulate cell fate at early steps of development during neurogenesis. M-Ras, induced and activated by BMP-2 signaling, also participates in the osteoblastic determination, differentiation, and transdifferentiation under p38 MAPK and JNK regulation. M-Ras is involved in TNF-alpha-stimulated and Rap1-mediated LFA-1 activation in splenocytes. More generally, cells transfected with M-Ras exhibit dendritic appearances with microspikes, suggesting that M-Ras may participate in reorganization of the actin cytoskeleton. In addition, it is reported that M-Ras forms a complex with SCRIB and SHOC2, a polarity protein with tumor suppressor properties, and may play a key role in tumorigenic growth.

== Clinical significance ==
In humans, other members of the Ras subfamilies carry mutations in human cancers. Furthermore, the Ras proteins are not only involved in tumorigenesis but also in many developmental disorders. For instance, the Ras-related proteins appear to be overexpressed in human carcinomas of the oral cavity, esophagus, stomach, skin, and breast, as well as in lymphomas. More currently, Ras family members such as R-RAS, R-RAS2 and also R-RAS3 have also been implicated as main factors in triggering neural transformation, with R-RAS2 as the most significant element.

=== Clinical marker ===
A multi-locus genetic risk score study based on a combination of 27 loci, including the MRAS gene, identified individuals at increased risk for both incidence and recurrent coronary artery disease events, as well as an enhanced clinical benefit from statin therapy. The study was based on a community cohort study (the Malmo Diet and Cancer study) and four additional randomized controlled trials of primary prevention cohorts (JUPITER and ASCOT) and secondary prevention cohorts (CARE and PROVE IT-TIMI 22).

== Interactions ==
MRAS has been shown to interact with RASSF5 and RALGDS.
