= Oncolytics Biotech =

American biotechnology company

Oncolytics Biotech Inc.
- Type: Public
- Traded as: Nasdaq: ONCY
- Industry: Biopharmaceutical
- Founded: 1998 Calgary, Alberta, Canada
- Headquarters: Calgary, Alberta, United States
- Key people: Jared Kelly - Chief Executive Officer; Kirk Look - Chief Financial Officer; Tom Heineman - Chief Medical Officer; Andrew Aromando - Chief Business Officer
- Products: pelareorep, a first-in-class intravenously delivered immuno-oncolytic virus (IOV) for the treatment of solid tumors and hematological malignancies.
- Website: www.oncolyticsbiotech.com

Oncolytics Biotech Inc. is a biotech company headquartered in San Diego, California, that is developing an intravenously delivered immuno-oncolytic virus called pelareorep for the treatment of solid tumors and hematological malignancies. Pelareorep is a non-pathogenic, proprietary isolate of the unmodified reovirus that induces selective tumor lysis and promotes an inflamed tumor phenotype through innate and adaptive immune responses.

== History ==
Oncolytics Biotech Inc. was founded in Calgary in 1998 in response to discoveries made on the oncolytic potential of reovirus made at the University of Calgary during the 1990s. In June 2000, it began trading on the Toronto Stock Exchange (TSX). On October 5, 2001, it was listed on the Nasdaq.

Since its inception, Oncolytics Biotech Inc. has worked to take pelareorep, its proprietary formulation of human reovirus, through the development and regulatory requirements necessary to develop it as a potential cancer therapeutic. In 2000, Oncolytics Biotech Inc. received permission to conduct its first phase I clinical trial, which was designed to test the safety of pelareorep in a human patients. The positive results of this first study led to the rapid and continuous expansion of Oncolytics’ clinical trial program, with phase 2 studies beginning in Canada in 2001, U.S. and subsequent cross-border studies beginning in 2002, and enrollment in a multi-site phase 3 trial beginning in 2010. The company has conducted numerous clinical trials studying pelareorep in a variety of cancers, including pancreatic, breast, head and neck, prostate, lung, colorectal, bladder and ovarian cancers.

The company was issued its first Canadian patent in August 2000, and currently holds more than 415 patents worldwide, including more than 60 U.S. and 20 Canadian patents, and more than 60 applications pending worldwide.

== pelareorep ==
Pelareorep for a first-in-class, systemically administered, immuno-oncolytic virus. It was developed from preclinical research done at the University of Calgary by Jim Strong and Matt Coffey, Oncolytics' former president, chief executive officer and chief operating officer. REOLYSIN (trademarked) is the former trade name for pelareorep.

Pelareorep is a proprietary formulation of human reovirus, which is naturally found in mammalian respiratory and bowel systems. Most people have been exposed to reovirus by adulthood, but the infection does not typically produce symptoms. Reovirus was noted to be a potential cancer therapeutic when early studies suggested it reproduces well in certain cancer cell lines. It has since been shown to replicate specifically in cells that have an activated Ras pathway with very little effect in cells that do not have active Ras pathways. Activating mutations of the Ras protein and upstream elements of the Ras protein may play a role in more than two thirds of all human cancers, including most metastatic disease, which suggests that pelareorep may be an effective therapeutic for many Ras-activated tumor types and potentially for some cell proliferative disorders.

In both single-arm and randomized phase 2 clinical studies, pelareorep, in combination with various chemotherapeutic agents, has shown a trend to improve overall survival (OS) in certain indications and patient populations, while having a limited impact on objective response rate (ORR) or progression-free survival (PFS), a therapeutic profile consistent with those observed with approved immunotherapies. Based on these observations, Oncolytics believes Pelareorep has multiple components to its mechanism of action (MOA):

- Direct tumor lysis – selective viral replication in permissive cancer cells leading to tumor cell lysis;
- Innate immune response – viral replication resulting in a cascade of chemokines/cytokines causing natural killer (NK) cells to recognize and attack cancer cells; and
- Adaptive immune response – antigen presenting cells (APCs) display tumor-associated antigens (TAA) and viral-associated antigens (VAA) to educate T-cells to recognize and destroy cancer cells.

== Research and Development Collaborations ==
Oncolytics Biotech Inc. has collaborated with the National Cancer Institute (NCI), the University of Leeds, the Canadian Cancer Trials Group (CCTG) (formerly the National Cancer Institute of Canada Clinical Trials Group) and the Cancer Therapy & Research Centre at the University of Texas Health Science Center in San Antonio, among others, to conduct multiple clinical trials in the United States and United Kingdom. Oncolytics is currently collaborating with Myeloma UK and Celgene Corporation, the CCTG, the NCI and the University of Texas. In May 2018, Oncolytics Biotech collaborated with Merck & Northwestern University for the research on second-line pancreatic cancer.

== Clinical Development ==
Pelareorep has completed clinical trials in a variety of cancer types. The company's clinical development plan is based on drug combinations that can potentially boost each response of pelareorep's mechanism of action, with three development pathways: 1) chemo combinations (direct cell lysis) 2) immunotherapy combinations (adaptive immune response) and; 3) combination with (immunomodulators) IMiDs / targeted therapy (innate immune response).

As part of pelareorep's registration pathway, Oncolytics, in partnership with CCTG, is conducting a phase 2 clinical trial in metastatic breast cancer patients receiving standard weekly paclitaxel therapy. In March 2017, the company announced positive overall survival data from the open-label, randomized study where, in the intention-to-treat patient population, there was a statistically significant improvement in median overall survival from 10.4 months on the control arm to 17.4 months on the test arm. In May 2017, Oncolytics announced that the U.S. Food and Drug Administration (FDA) granted Fast Track designation for pelareorep for the treatment of metastatic breast cancer, and in September 2017, the company announced a successful End-of-Phase 2 meeting with the FDA.

Oncolytics is conducting its first study of pelareorep in combination with checkpoint inhibitors in an open-label phase 1b trial. The trial will assess the safety and dose-limiting toxicity of pelareorep in combination with pembrolizumab (KEYTRUDA) and chemotherapy in patients with advanced or metastatic pancreatic adenocarcinoma who have failed, or did not tolerate, first line treatment.

On March 16, 2017, Oncolytics announced that cancer charity Myeloma UK launched MUK eleven, a phase 1b trial studying pelareorep in combination with Celgene Corporation's immunomodulatory drugs (IMiDs), Imnovid (pomalidomide) or Revlimid (lenalidomide), as a rescue treatment in relapsing myeloma patients. The first patient was treated in September 2017.

Oncolytics is conducting two phase 2 clinical trials studying pelareorep in pancreatic cancer: in collaboration with the University of Texas, Oncolytics is studying pelareorep in combination with gemcitabine (Gemzar) in patients with advanced pancreatic cancer, and in collaboration with the NCI, Oncolytics is studying pelareorep in combination with carboplatin and paclitaxel as a first line treatment of patients with recurrent or metastatic pancreatic cancer.
