= Cysmethynil =

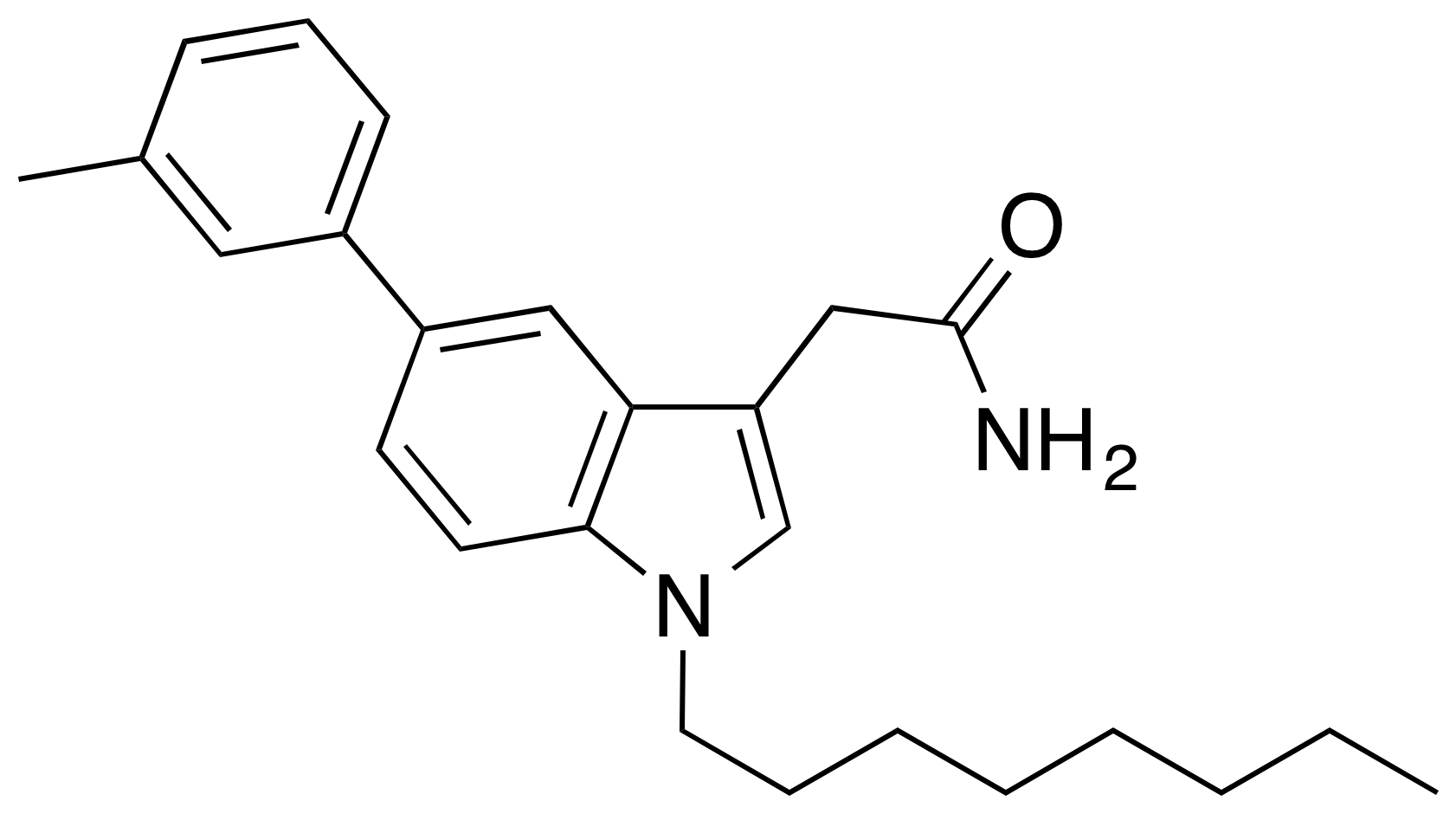

Names
- Preferred IUPAC name 2-[5-(3-Methylphenyl)-1-octyl-1H-indol-3-yl]acetamide
- Other names Cysmethynil, 2-(1-octyl-5-m-tolyl-1H-indol-3-yl)acetamide, 9J20

Identifiers
CAS Number	851636-83-4
3D model (JSmol)	Interactive image
ChemSpider	5294022
PubChem CID	6918831
UNII	R5MT8HFQ9E
CompTox Dashboard (EPA)	DTXSID90426093
- InChI: InChI=1S/C25H32N2O/c1-3-4-5-6-7-8-14-27-18-22(17-25(26)28)23-16-21(12-13-24(23)27)20-11-9-10-19(2)15-20/h9-13,15-16,18H,3-8,14,17H2,1-2H3,(H2,26,28) Key: QIXBOOVPFRZHQQ-UHFFFAOYSA-N
- SMILES: O=C(N)Cc2c1cc(ccc1n(c2)CCCCCCCC)c3cccc(c3)C

Properties
Chemical formula	C_{25}H_{32}N_{2}O
Molar mass	376.544 g·mol^{−1}
Density	1.068 g/cm^{3}
Melting point	247.08 °C (476.74 °F; 520.23 K)
Boiling point	594.156 °C (1,101.481 °F; 867.306 K) at 760 mmHg
Solubility in water	0.005429 mg/L
Vapor pressure	1.37×10^{−12} mmHg at 25 °C

Hazards
Flash point	313.134 °C (595.641 °F; 586.284 K)
- Except where otherwise noted, data are given for materials in their standard state (at 25 °C [77 °F], 100 kPa). Infobox references

Cysmethynil is a chemical compound that is reported to inhibit Icmt, a protein that methylates a Ras protein, which then triggers uncontrolled cell growth. If Icmt no longer activates Ras, cell growth and proliferatation remains under normal control. As such, this small molecule has been investigated as a treatment for cancer. In animal models containing multiple human tumor growths, treatment with cysmethynil causes autophagy in the cell and results in cell death and reduced tumor burden. In prostate cancer cells, cysmethynil inhibits Icmt such that the cell is stuck in the G1 phase, and this leads to the autophagic cell death.
