= RAPGEF2 =

Protein-coding gene in the species Homo sapiens

Identifiers
- Aliases: RAPGEF2, CNrasGEF, NRAPGEP, PDZ-GEF1, PDZGEF1, RA-GEF, RA-GEF-1, Rap-GEP, nRap GEP, Rap guanine nucleotide exchange factor 2, RAGEF
- External IDs: OMIM: 609530; MGI: 2659071; GeneCards: RAPGEF2

Gene location (Human)
Chr.	Chromosome 4 (human)
Band	4q32.1	Start	159,103,013 bp
Band	4q32.1	End	159,360,174 bp

Gene location (Mouse)
Chr.	Chromosome 3 (mouse)
Band	3|3 E3	Start	78,969,823 bp
Band	3|3 E3	End	79,193,824 bp
RNA expression pattern
Bgee	Human / Mouse (ortholog); Top expressed in: Brodmann area 23; middle temporal gyrus; endothelial cell; frontal pole; postcentral gyrus; orbitofrontal cortex; tibia; Brodmann area 10; Brodmann area 46; entorhinal cortex / Top expressed in: olfactory tubercle; subdivision of hippocampus; Region I of hippocampus proper; subiculum; piriform cortex; lateral septal nucleus; temporal lobe; primary motor cortex; amygdala; anterior amygdaloid area; More reference expression data
BioGPS	n/a
Gene ontology
Molecular function	calcium ion binding; protein binding; diacylglycerol binding; signal transducer activity; guanyl-nucleotide exchange factor activity; WW domain binding; phosphatidic acid binding; PDZ domain binding; cAMP binding; cGMP binding; beta-1 adrenergic receptor binding; GTPase activator activity
Cellular component	cell-cell junction; endocytic vesicle; synapse; integral component of plasma membrane; apical plasma membrane; bicellular tight junction; endosome; cell junction; neuron projection; soma; cytoplasm; cytosol; late endosome; membrane; plasma membrane; perinuclear region of cytoplasm; protein-containing complex; intracellular anatomical structure
Biological process	positive regulation of ERK1 and ERK2 cascade; brain-derived neurotrophic factor receptor signaling pathway; cellular response to cGMP; ventricular system development; positive regulation of protein binding; forebrain neuron development; regulation of cell junction assembly; protein localization to plasma membrane; positive regulation of neuron projection development; adenylate cyclase-activating adrenergic receptor signaling pathway; nervous system development; neuron migration; neuropeptide signaling pathway; multicellular organism development; G protein-coupled receptor signaling pathway; negative regulation of melanin biosynthetic process; cellular response to nerve growth factor stimulus; cell differentiation; positive regulation of cAMP-mediated signaling; intracellular signal transduction; cellular response to cAMP; nerve growth factor signaling pathway; regulation of cell population proliferation; Rap protein signal transduction; small GTPase mediated signal transduction; negative regulation of cell population proliferation; blood vessel development; positive regulation of dendritic cell apoptotic process; positive regulation of vasculogenesis; microvillus assembly; negative regulation of dendrite morphogenesis; regulation of synaptic plasticity; neuron projection development; establishment of endothelial intestinal barrier; positive regulation of cAMP-dependent protein kinase activity; positive regulation of neuron migration; positive regulation of protein kinase activity; establishment of endothelial barrier; signal transduction; MAPK cascade; positive regulation of GTPase activity; cAMP-mediated signaling
Sources:Amigo / QuickGO
Orthologs
Databases	NCBI: entry; OMA: entry
Species	Human	Mouse
Entrez	9693	76089
Ensembl	ENSG00000109756	ENSMUSG00000062232
UniProt	Q9Y4G8	Q8CHG7
RefSeq (mRNA)	NM_014247; NM_001351724; NM_001351725; NM_001351726; NM_001351727 NM_001351728; NM_001394067	NM_001099624; NM_001310536
RefSeq (protein)	NP_055062; NP_001338653; NP_001338654; NP_001338655; NP_001338656 NP_001338657	NP_001093094; NP_001297465
Location (UCSC)	Chr 4: 159.1 – 159.36 Mb	Chr 3: 78.97 – 79.19 Mb
PubMed search
- Wikidata
View/Edit Human	View/Edit Mouse

Rap guanine nucleotide exchange factor 2 is a protein that in humans is encoded by the RAPGEF2 gene.

RAPGEF2 is a cyclic AMP binding protein.

== Function ==
Members of the RAS subfamily of GTPases function in signal transduction as GTP/GDP-regulated switches that cycle between inactive GDP- and active GTP-bound states. Guanine nucleotide exchange factors (GEFs) such as RAPGEF2 serve as RAS activators by promoting acquisition of GTP to maintain the active GTP-bound state and are the key link between cell surface receptors and RAS activation.

== Interactions ==
RAPGEF2 has been shown to interact with RAP1A and RALGDS.
