= C25H32N2O =

The molecular formula C_{25}H_{32}N_{2}O (molar mass: 376.53 g/mol, exact mass: 376.2515 u) may refer to:

- 3-Allylfentanyl
- Cyclopentylfentanyl
- Cysmethynil
