= MiR-125 =

MicroRNA-125 (miR-125) is a highly conserved microRNA family consisting of miR-125a and miR-125b.MiR-125 can be found throughout diverse species from nematode to humans. MiR-125 family members are involved in cell differentiation, proliferation and apoptosis as a result of targeting messenger RNAs related to these cellular processes. By affecting these cellular processes, miR-125 can cause promotion or suppression of pathological processes including carcinogenesis, muscle abnormalities, neurological disorders and pathologies of the immune system. Moreover, miR-125 also plays an important role in normal immune functions and was described to affect development and function of immune cells as well as playing role in immunological host defense in response to bacterial and viral infections.

== Genome location and biogenesis ==
Each member of miR-125 family has two different variants of mature miRNAs - 5p and 3p. Both variants originate from the same pre-miRNA. MiR-125-5p variant generally shows higher expression compared to miR-125-3p. In humans, miR-125 family is composed of three homologs: hsa-miR-125a, hsa-miR-125b-1 and hsa-miR-125b-2. MiR-125a has been found to be located on chromosome 19, while paralogs of miR-125b are transcribed from two loci on chromosome 11 and chromosome 21.

== Brain ==
As a brain-enriched microRNA, miR-125b participates in neuronal differentiation but also in many diseases associated with degenerating brain tissues.

MiR-125b promotes neuronal differentiation, thus levels of this microRNA get higher during neurogenesis. MiR-125b can contribute to the process of neuronal differentiation by targeting cyclin-dependent kinase inhibitor 2A (CDKN2A), a negative regulator of the cell cycle. On the other hand, downregulation of CDKN2A correlates with chronic neurological disorders associated with astrogliosis, such as advanced Alzheimer disease.

== Muscle ==
MiR-125 family is related to cardiomyocytes and the development of heart in embryonic period of mammals. Decreased levels of miR-125 can cause abnormal development of the cardiovascular system in these early stages.

MiR-125 plays role in a variety of cardiovascular and cerebrovascular diseases, in their occurrence and development. The same family members of miR-125 can play different roles in different pathological processes. For instance, high levels of miR-125b can protect cardiomyocytes from apoptosis and inflammation. While at the same time, overexpression of miR-125 can support cardiac fibrosis by enhancing proliferation of fibroblasts and reducing their apoptosis. Significantly increased levels of miR-125b have also been found in patients with heart failure.

MiR-125b can also negatively regulate skeletal myoblast differentiation and muscle regeneration by targeting insulin-like growth factor II (IGF-II). Decreased levels of this microRNA were noted during these processes. However, overexpression of miR-125b, especially the miR-125b-5p form, can protect skeletal muscle from atrophy.

== Role in immune system ==
Targets of miR-125 are involved in regulation of hematopoiesis, inflammation and many immune cells function. Different expression levels of miR-125 are found among different types of immune cells and stages of hematopoiesis.

Principally, expression of both miR-15a and miR-125b decreases during the process of cell differentiation. Higher expression levels are found in hematopoietic stem cells (HSCs) and are associated with elevation of self-renewal and survival in these cells. Increased expression of miR-125a improves long-term multi-lineage repopulation and self-renewal of HSCs by blocking apoptosis pathways. MiR-125b can even block terminal differentiation of hematopoietic progenitors and also regulate HSC homeostasis by shifting the balance of TGFβ and Wnt signaling pathways. Additionally, miR-125b is associated with an impairment of B cell development and plays role in mainly negative regulation of T cell development.

MiR-125b can affect inflammation by targeting TNF-α, enhancing the stability of NF-κB inhibitor NKIRAS2 and also by promotion of differentiation and activation of macrophages. Increased levels of miR-125b may enhance expression of type I interferons and participate in antiviral defense. For instance, this miRNA contributes to HIV-1 latency by destabilization of HIV-1 transcript by binding to its 3' end. And miR-125a was described to interfere with transcript of hepatitis B virus. MiR-125 can also participate in regulation of immune response against bacterial infection. Upregulated levels of miR-125 can contribute to turning off the TLR signaling in the absence of microbial infection. While downregulation of this miRNA can support inflammatory response. MiR-125 was also described to suppress the development of rheumatoid arthritis by inhibition of PI3K/Akt/mTOR signalling pathway via PARP2 targeting.

== Role in carcinogenesis ==
By targeting transcripts of genes such as transcription factors, matrix-metalloproteinases, Bcl-2 family gene members, small GTPases, miR-125 dysregulation may lead to abnormal metabolism, proliferation, cell invasion and metastasis. Effects of miR-125 in cancer are cell type dependent. MiR-125 is defined either as an oncogene or as a tumor suppressor and can promote or prevent tumor growth at various stages. The tumor promoter or suppressor role of miR-125 depends on cellular context and the same target may have different functions in different cellular processes and diseases. MiR-125 cancer research is often related to hematological malignancies.

Upregulation of miR-125b occurs in patients with B-cell acute lymphoblastic leukemia, megakaryoblastic leukemia, myelodysplasia and acute myeloid leukemia. While miR-125a acts as an oncogenic miRNA in non-blood cancers, its oncogenic functions have been described in cervical cancer, colorectal cancer, nasopharyngeal carcinoma and esophageal carcinomas. On the other hand, high expression of miR-125b was shown to decrease cell proliferation and induces apoptosis. The cell ability of tumor formation may be reduced with increased levels of miR-125-b because of the PI3K/Akt/mTOR pathway targeting as was described in cervical cancer. By targeting Bcl-2 family members transcripts, miR-125 is involved in regulation of apoptosis as well. Depending on the context and expression levels, this miRNA can either protect cells from apoptosis or promote this process.

As a tumor suppressor miRNA, MiR-125 was described to occur in ovarian cancer, bladder cancer, breast cancer, hepatocellular carcinoma, melanoma, cutaneous squamous cell carcinoma, osteosarcoma, colorectal carcinoma, glioblastoma, renal cell carcinoma, thyroid cancer and prostate cancer. In terms of tumor suppressive functions and mechanisms, miR-125 family has been described to directly or indirectly silence several oncogenic pathways, such as KRAS. MiR-125 inhibits cell invasion and metastasis by targeting MMP11 and MMP13 matrix-metalloproteinases and small GTPases such as RhoA and Rac1 MiR-125 was also described to regulate angiogenesis via VEGF-A targeting.
