= Pelareorep =

Pelareorep (previously known under the trademark Reolysin) is a proprietary isolate of the unmodified human reovirus being developed as a systemically administered immuno-oncological viral agent for the treatment of solid tumors and hematological malignancies. Pelareorep is an oncolytic virus, which means that it preferentially lyses cancer cells. Pelareorep also promotes an inflamed tumor phenotype through innate and adaptive immune responses. Preliminary clinical trials indicate that it may have anti-cancer effects across a variety of cancer types (including breast, colorectal and pancreatic, as well as multiple myeloma) when administered alone and in combination with other cancer therapies.

In April 2015, the U.S. Food and Drug Administration (FDA) granted orphan drug designation to pelareorep for malignant glioma. In May 2017, the FDA granted Fast Track Designation for pelareorep in metastatic breast cancer.

Oncolytics Biotech has more than 415 patents for pelareorep issued globally, including more than 60 in the U.S. and 20 in Canada, as well as numerous patents pending worldwide.

== Mechanism of action ==
Reovirus, an acronym for Respiratory Enteric Orphan virus, generally infects mammalian respiratory and bowel systems. Most people have been exposed to reovirus by adulthood; however, the infection does not typically produce symptoms.

Reovirus was noted to be a potential cancer therapeutic when early studies on reovirus suggested it reproduces well in certain cancer cell lines. It has since been shown to replicate specifically in cells that have an activated Ras (a cellular signaling pathway that is involved in cell growth and differentiation) with very little effect in cells that do not have active Ras pathways. Reovirus replicates in and eventually kills Ras-activated tumour cells, and as cell death occurs, progeny virus particles are then free to infect surrounding cancer cells. This cycle of infection, replication and cell death is believed to be repeated until all tumour cells carrying an activated Ras pathway are destroyed. Activating mutations of the Ras protein and upstream elements of the Ras protein may play a role in more than two thirds of all human cancers, including most metastatic disease, which suggests that pelareorep may be an effective therapeutic for many Ras-activated tumor types and potentially for some cell proliferative disorders.

In both single-arm and randomized phase 2 clinical studies, pelareorep, in combination with various chemotherapeutic agents, has shown a trend to improve overall survival (OS) in certain indications and patient populations, while having a limited impact on objective response rate (ORR) or progression-free survival (PFS), a therapeutic profile consistent with those observed with approved immunotherapies. Based on these observations, Oncolytics believes pelareorep has multiple components to its mechanism of action (MOA):

- Direct tumor lysis – selective viral replication in permissive cancer cells leading to tumor cell lysis;
- Innate immune response – viral replication resulting in a cascade of chemokines/cytokines causing natural killer (NK) cells to recognize and attack cancer cells; and
- Adaptive immune response – antigen presenting cells (APCs) display tumor-associated antigens (TAA) and viral-associated antigens (VAA) to educate T-cells to recognize and destroy cancer cells.

== Clinical trials ==
Pelareorep has been evaluated in numerous clinical trials in variety of cancers, including pancreatic, breast, head and neck, prostate, lung, colorectal, bladder and ovarian cancers.

Pelareorep clinical development plan is based on drug combinations that can potentially boost each response of pelareorep's mechanism of action, with three development pathways: 1) chemo combinations (direct cell lysis) 2) immunotherapy combinations (adaptive immune response) and; 3) combination with (immunomodulators) IMiDs / targeted therapy (innate immune response).

As part of pelareorep's registration pathway, Oncolytics, in partnership with the Canadian Cancer Trials Group (CCTG) (formerly the National Cancer Institute of Canada Clinical Trials Group), is conducting a phase 2 clinical trial in metastatic breast cancer patients receiving standard weekly paclitaxel therapy. In March 2017, the company announced positive overall survival data from the open-label, randomized study where, in the intention-to-treat patient population, there was a statistically significant improvement in median overall survival from 10.4 months on the control arm to 17.4 months on the test arm. In May 2017, Oncolytics announced that the FDA granted Fast Track designation for pelareorep for the treatment of metastatic breast cancer, and in September 2017, the company announced a successful End-of-Phase 2 meeting with the FDA.

Oncolytics is conducting its first study of pelareorep in combination with a checkpoint inhibitors in an open-label phase 1b trial. The trial will assess the safety and dose-limiting toxicity of pelareorep in combination with pembrolizumab (KEYTRUDA) and chemotherapy in patients with advanced or metastatic pancreatic adenocarcinoma who have failed, or did not tolerate, first line treatment.

On March 16, 2017 Oncolytics announced that cancer charity Myeloma UK launched MUK eleven, a phase 1b trial studying pelareorep in combination with Celgene Corporation's immunomodulatory drugs (IMiDs), pomalidomide or lenalidomide, as a rescue treatment in relapsing myeloma patients. The first patient was treated in 2017.

Oncolytics is conducting two phase 2 clinical trials studying pelareorep in pancreatic cancer: in collaboration with the University of Texas, Oncolytics is studying pelareorep in combination with gemcitabine in patients with advanced pancreatic cancer, and in collaboration with the NCI, Oncolytics is studying pelareorep in combination with carboplatin and paclitaxel as a first line treatment of patients with recurrent or metastatic pancreatic cancer.

== See also ==
- Virotherapy
