= RUNDC3A =

Protein-coding gene in humans

Identifiers
- Aliases: RUNDC3A, RAP2IP, RPIP-8, RPIP8, RUN domain containing 3A
- External IDs: OMIM: 605448; MGI: 1858752; GeneCards: RUNDC3A

Gene location (Human)
Chr.	Chromosome 17 (human)
Band	17q21.31	Start	44,308,413 bp
Band	17q21.31	End	44,318,670 bp

Gene location (Mouse)
Chr.	Chromosome 11 (mouse)
Band	11|11 D	Start	102,284,229 bp
Band	11|11 D	End	102,293,381 bp
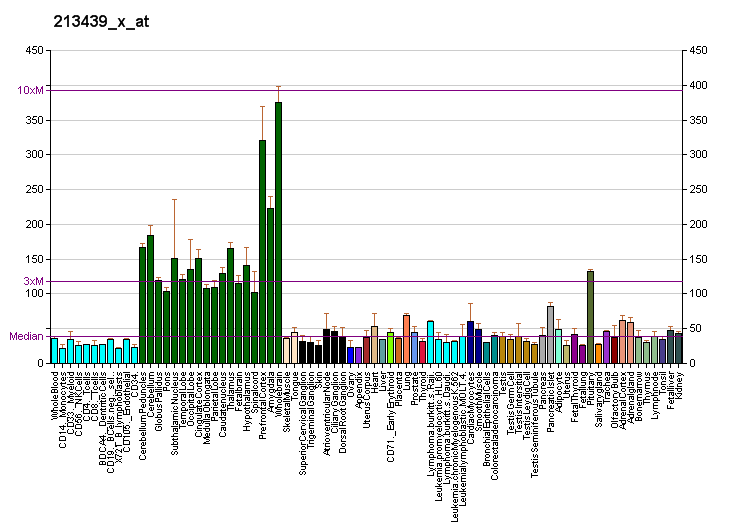
RNA expression pattern
Bgee	Human / Mouse (ortholog); Top expressed in: right frontal lobe; right hemisphere of cerebellum; cingulate gyrus; anterior cingulate cortex; prefrontal cortex; Brodmann area 9; amygdala; nucleus accumbens; caudate nucleus; hippocampus proper / Top expressed in: neural layer of retina; superior frontal gyrus; dentate gyrus of hippocampal formation granule cell; primary visual cortex; cerebellar cortex; entorhinal cortex; perirhinal cortex; CA3 field; primary motor cortex; lobe of cerebellum; More reference expression data
BioGPS	More reference expression data
Gene ontology
Molecular function	protein binding; guanylate cyclase activator activity; GTPase regulator activity; peptide hormone receptor binding
Cellular component	cytosol; plasma membrane
Biological process	small GTPase mediated signal transduction; positive regulation of guanylate cyclase activity; regulation of catalytic activity; positive regulation of cGMP-mediated signaling
Sources:Amigo / QuickGO
Orthologs
Databases	NCBI: entry; OMA: entry
Species	Human	Mouse
Entrez	10900	51799
Ensembl	ENSG00000108309	ENSMUSG00000006575
UniProt	Q59EK9	O08576
RefSeq (mRNA)	NM_001144825; NM_001144826; NM_006695	NM_001252347; NM_016759; NM_001362803; NM_001362804
RefSeq (protein)	NP_001138297; NP_001138298; NP_006686	NP_001239276; NP_058039; NP_001349732; NP_001349733
Location (UCSC)	Chr 17: 44.31 – 44.32 Mb	Chr 11: 102.28 – 102.29 Mb
PubMed search
- Wikidata
View/Edit Human	View/Edit Mouse

RUN domain-containing protein 3A is a protein that in humans is encoded by the RUNDC3A gene.

== Interactions ==
RUNDC3A has been shown to interact with RAP2A.

== See also ==
- RUN domain
