= RALGDS =

Protein-coding gene in the species Homo sapiens

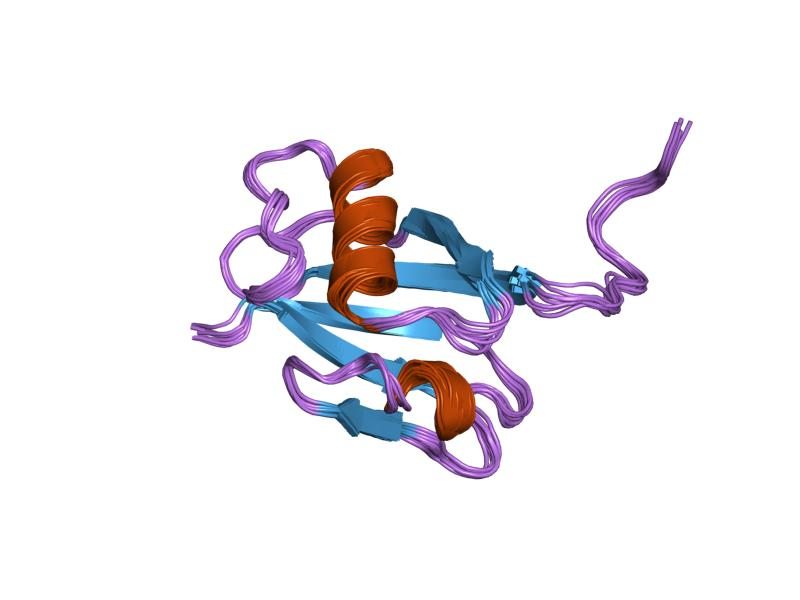

Identifiers
- Aliases: RALGDS, RGDS, RGF, RalGEF, ral guanine nucleotide dissociation stimulator
- External IDs: OMIM: 601619; MGI: 107485; GeneCards: RALGDS
Available structures
PDB	Ortholog search: PDBe RCSB
PDB	List of PDB id codes 1RAX, 2B3A, 2RGF, 3KH0

Gene location (Human)
Chr.	Chromosome 9 (human)
Band	9q34.13-q34.2	Start	133,097,720 bp
Band	9q34.13-q34.2	End	133,149,334 bp

Gene location (Mouse)
Chr.	Chromosome 2 (mouse)
Band	2|2 A3	Start	28,403,137 bp
Band	2|2 A3	End	28,443,093 bp
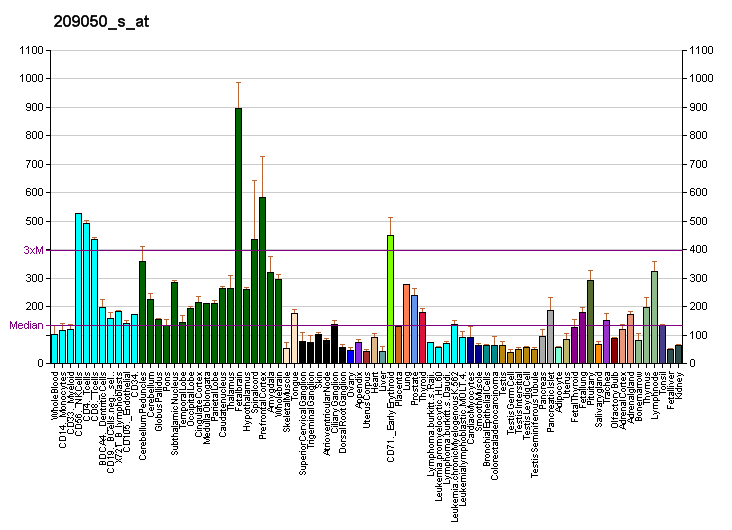

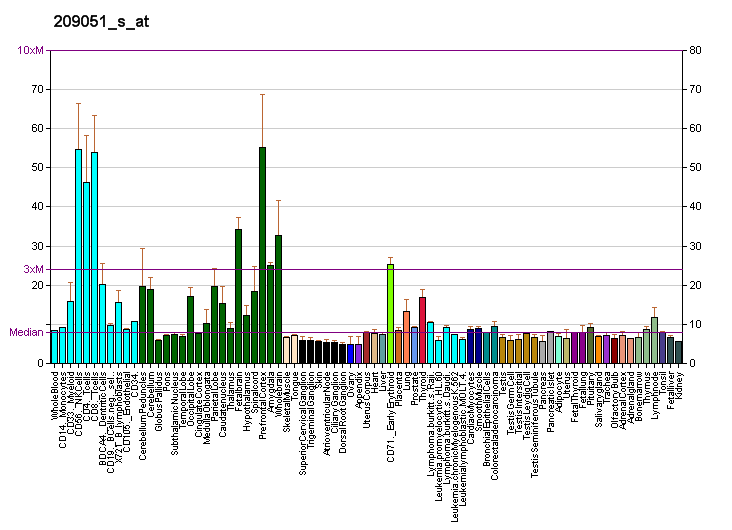
RNA expression pattern
Bgee	Human / Mouse (ortholog); Top expressed in: right hemisphere of cerebellum; pituitary gland; anterior pituitary; C1 segment; skin of abdomen; skin of leg; substantia nigra; granulocyte; amygdala; caudate nucleus / Top expressed in: lactiferous gland; entorhinal cortex; perirhinal cortex; CA3 field; genital tubercle; spermatid; primary visual cortex; superior frontal gyrus; lip; ventricular zone; More reference expression data
BioGPS	More reference expression data
Gene ontology
Molecular function	protein binding; guanyl-nucleotide exchange factor activity; GTPase regulator activity
Cellular component	cytosol; brush border; cytoplasm; nucleus
Biological process	small GTPase mediated signal transduction; Ras protein signal transduction; signal transduction; regulation of catalytic activity
Sources:Amigo / QuickGO
Orthologs
Databases	NCBI: entry; OMA: entry
Species	Human	Mouse
Entrez	5900	19730
Ensembl	ENSG00000160271	ENSMUSG00000026821
UniProt	Q12967	Q03385
RefSeq (mRNA)	NM_006266; NM_001042368; NM_001271774; NM_001271775; NM_001271776	NM_001145834; NM_001145835; NM_001145836; NM_009058
RefSeq (protein)	NP_001035827; NP_001258703; NP_001258704; NP_001258705; NP_006257	NP_001139306; NP_001139307; NP_001139308; NP_033084
Location (UCSC)	Chr 9: 133.1 – 133.15 Mb	Chr 2: 28.4 – 28.44 Mb
PubMed search
- Wikidata
View/Edit Human	View/Edit Mouse

Ral guanine nucleotide dissociation stimulator is a protein that is encoded by the RALGDS gene in humans.

== Interactions ==
RALGDS has been shown to interact with:

- Arrestin beta 1,
- Arrestin beta 2,
- HRAS,
- KRAS,
- MRAS,
- RAP1A,
- RAP2A,
- RAPGEF2, and
- RRAS.
