= RIN1 =

Protein-coding gene in the species Homo sapiens

Identifiers
- Aliases: RIN1, Ras and Rab interactor 1
- External IDs: OMIM: 605965; MGI: 2385695; GeneCards: RIN1

Gene location (Human)
Chr.	Chromosome 11 (human)
Band	11q13.2	Start	66,330,241 bp
Band	11q13.2	End	66,336,840 bp

Gene location (Mouse)
Chr.	Chromosome 19 (mouse)
Band	19|19 A	Start	5,100,509 bp
Band	19|19 A	End	5,107,099 bp
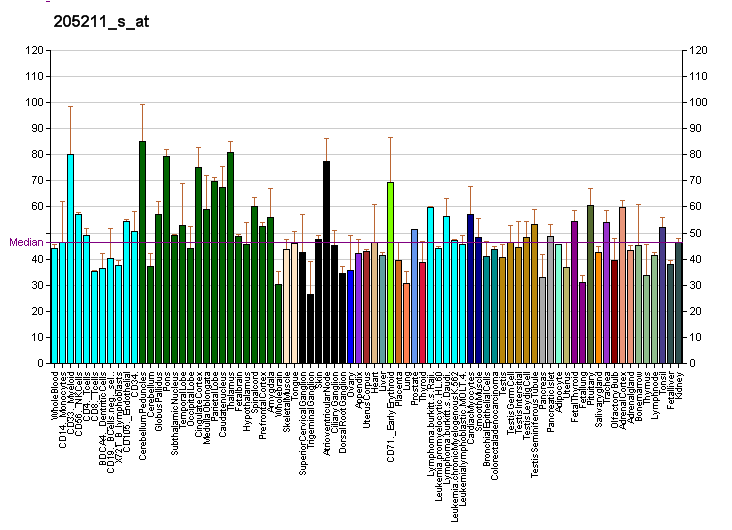
RNA expression pattern
Bgee	Human / Mouse (ortholog); Top expressed in: parotid gland; tendon of biceps brachii; olfactory bulb; right hemisphere of cerebellum; skin of leg; skin of abdomen; vena cava; nucleus accumbens; putamen; external globus pallidus / Top expressed in: nucleus accumbens; superior frontal gyrus; primary visual cortex; dentate gyrus of hippocampal formation granule cell; dorsal striatum; hippocampus proper; prefrontal cortex; olfactory tubercle; amygdala; spermatid; More reference expression data
BioGPS	More reference expression data
Gene ontology
Molecular function	protein binding; GTPase activator activity
Cellular component	cytoplasm; plasma membrane; cytoskeleton; membrane; cytosol; dendrite; soma
Biological process	positive regulation of GTPase activity; endocytosis; signal transduction; memory; associative learning; negative regulation of synaptic plasticity
Sources:Amigo / QuickGO
Orthologs
Databases	NCBI: entry; OMA: entry
Species	Human	Mouse
Entrez	9610	225870
Ensembl	ENSG00000174791	ENSMUSG00000024883
UniProt	Q13671	Q921Q7
RefSeq (mRNA)	NM_004292; NM_001363559; NM_001363560	NM_145495; NM_001374051; NM_001374052
RefSeq (protein)	NP_004283; NP_001350488; NP_001350489	NP_663470; NP_001360980; NP_001360981
Location (UCSC)	Chr 11: 66.33 – 66.34 Mb	Chr 19: 5.1 – 5.11 Mb
PubMed search
- Wikidata
View/Edit Human	View/Edit Mouse

Ras and Rab interactor 1 is a protein that in humans is encoded by the RIN1 gene.

== Interactions ==
RIN1 has been shown to interact with HRAS.

Additionally, RIN1 binds and activates ABL family tyrosine kinases.
