= RASSF5 =

Protein-coding gene in humans

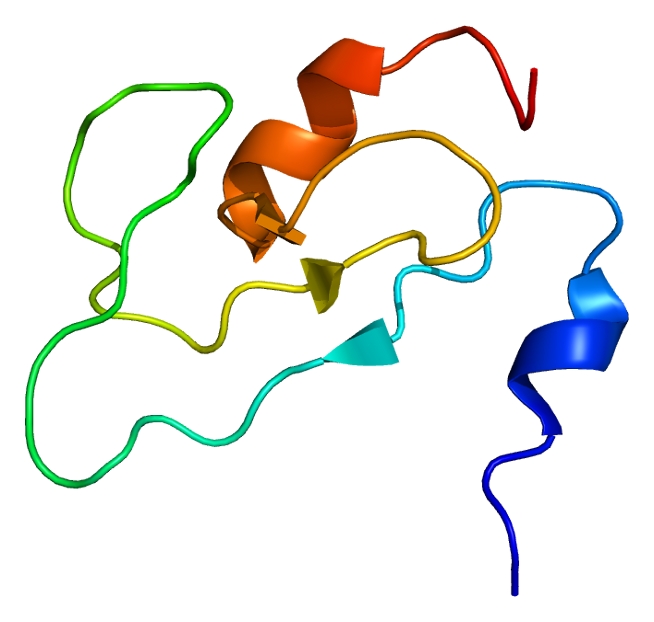

Identifiers
- Aliases: RASSF5, Maxp1, NORE1, NORE1A, NORE1B, RAPL, RASSF3, Ras association domain family member 5
- External IDs: OMIM: 607020; MGI: 1926375; GeneCards: RASSF5
Available structures
PDB	Ortholog search: PDBe RCSB
PDB	List of PDB id codes 4LGD, 4OH8

Gene location (Human)
Chr.	Chromosome 1 (human)
Band	1q32.1	Start	206,507,531 bp
Band	1q32.1	End	206,589,448 bp

Gene location (Mouse)
Chr.	Chromosome 1 (mouse)
Band	1 E4|1 56.91 cM	Start	131,104,147 bp
Band	1 E4|1 56.91 cM	End	131,172,995 bp
RNA expression pattern
Bgee	Human / Mouse (ortholog); Top expressed in: skin of arm; blood; granulocyte; thymus; mucosa of ileum; lymph node; monocyte; bone marrow; appendix; nasal epithelium / Top expressed in: granulocyte; thymus; primary oocyte; mesenteric lymph nodes; spleen; secondary oocyte; blood; motor neuron; zygote; endocardial cushion; More reference expression data
BioGPS	n/a
Gene ontology
Molecular function	protein binding; metal ion binding; identical protein binding
Cellular component	cytoplasm; microtubule; cytoskeleton; nucleus
Biological process	intracellular signal transduction; positive regulation of protein ubiquitination; signal transduction; negative regulation of cell population proliferation; regulation of protein localization to nucleus; apoptotic process; regulation of apoptotic process
Sources:Amigo / QuickGO
Orthologs
Databases	NCBI: entry; OMA: entry
Species	Human	Mouse
Entrez	83593	54354
Ensembl	ENSG00000266094	ENSMUSG00000026430
UniProt	Q8WWW0	Q5EBH1
RefSeq (mRNA)	NM_182665; NM_031437; NM_182663; NM_182664	NM_018750; NM_001311094; NM_001313731
RefSeq (protein)	NP_872604; NP_872605; NP_872606	NP_001298023; NP_001300660; NP_061220
Location (UCSC)	Chr 1: 206.51 – 206.59 Mb	Chr 1: 131.1 – 131.17 Mb
PubMed search
- Wikidata
View/Edit Human	View/Edit Mouse

Ras association domain-containing protein 5 is a protein that in humans is encoded by the RASSF5 or F5 gene.

== Function ==
This gene is a member of the Ras association domain family. It functions as a tumor suppressor, and is inactivated in a variety of cancers. The encoded protein localizes to centrosomes and microtubules, and associates with the GTP-activated forms of Ras, Rap1, and several other Ras-like small GTPases. The protein regulates lymphocyte adhesion and suppresses cell growth in response to activated Rap1 or Ras. Multiple transcript variants encoding different isoforms have been found for this gene.

== Interactions ==
RASSF5 has been shown to interact with RRAS, RAP2A, MRAS and RASSF1.
