= Rap1 =

Protein family

RAP1A, member of RAS oncogene family

Identifiers
- Symbol: RAP1A
- NCBI gene: 5906
- HGNC: 9855
- OMIM: 179520
- RefSeq: NM_002884
- UniProt: P62834

Other data
- Locus: Chr. 1 p13.3
Search for
- Structures: Swiss-model
- Domains: InterPro

RAP1B, member of RAS oncogene family

Identifiers
- Symbol: RAP1B
- NCBI gene: 5908
- HGNC: 9857
- OMIM: 179530
- RefSeq: NM_001010942
- UniProt: P61224

Other data
- Locus: Chr. 12 q14
Search for
- Structures: Swiss-model
- Domains: InterPro

Rap1 (Ras-proximate-1 or Ras-related protein 1) is a small GTPase, which are small cytosolic proteins that act like cellular switches and are vital for effective signal transduction. There are two isoforms of the Rap1 protein, each encoded by a separate gene, RAP1A and RAP1B. Rap1 belongs to Ras-related protein family.

GTPases are inactive when in their GDP-bound form, and become active when they bind to GTP. GTPase activating proteins (GAPs) and guanine nucleotide exchange factors (GEFs) regulate small GTPases, with GAPs promoting the GDP-bound (inactive) form, and GEFs promoting the GTP-bound (active) form. When bound to GTP, small GTPases regulate myriad cellular processes. These proteins are divided into families depending on their protein structure, and the most well studied is the Ras superfamily, of which Rap1 is a member. Whereas Ras is known for its role in cell proliferation and survival, Rap1 is predominantly involved in cell adhesion and cell junction formation. Ras and Rap are regulated by different sets of guanine nucleotide exchange factors and GTPase-activating proteins, thus providing one level of specificity.

== Effectors ==
=== RAPL ===
The identification of Rap1 effector proteins has provided important insights into mechanisms by which Rap1 regulates T-cell receptor (TCR) signaling to integrins. A constitutively active Rap1 construct, Rap1G12V, was used as a bait in a yeast two-hybrid screen to identify RAPL as a Rap1-binding protein.

Overexpression of RAPL enhances LFA-1 clustering and adhesion, and RAPL-deficient lymphocytes and dendritic cells exhibit impaired adhesion and migration. RAPL is also an integrin-associated protein as RAPL polarizes to the immunological synapse following antigen stimulation of T cells, colocalizes with LFA-1 following TCR or chemokine stimulation, and co-immunoprecipitates with LFA-1 in a Rap1-dependent manner (108). This interaction between RAPL and LFA-1 is dependent on lysine residues at positions 1097 and 1099 in the juxtamembrane region of the αL-subunit cytoplasmic domain. This is a functionally significant region of the αL cytoplasmic domain as deletion of the adjacent GFFKR motif results in a constitutively active LFA-1 integrin (124, 125). While lysines 1097 and 1099 are critical for Rap1-dependent activation of LFA-1, the β2-subunit cytoplasmic domain appears to be dispensable for activation of LFA-1 by Rap1 (126). Mutation of these lysine residues to alanine impairs the ability of LFA-1 to redistribute to the leading edge induced by Rap1 activation or overexpression of RAPL. Because RAPL localizes to the leading edge properly in cells expressing this mutant LFA-1, this finding suggests that RAPL may play a critical role in localizing LFA-1 to discrete regions of the plasma membrane. In T-cells, the immune cell adaptor SKAP1 couples the TCR to the formation of a complex between Rap1 and RapL for T-cell adhesion.

=== Mst1 ===
The serine–threonine kinase Mst1, a member of a family of kinases homologous to the Ste20 kinase in yeast, has recently been identified as a RAPL effector. TCR-mediated activation of Mst1 is dependent on RAPL, and TCR-mediated adhesion to ICAM-1 and antigen-dependent conjugate formation are impaired following RNAi-mediated knockdown of Mst1 expression. Although Rap1 and RAPL have been shown to regulate both LFA-1 affinity and clustering, overexpression of Mst1 only enhances LFA-1 clustering. This finding suggests that LFA-1 clustering is critical for TCR signaling to integrins that is mediated by Rap1. It also implies the existence of Mst1-independent mechanisms by which Rap1 regulates LFA-1 affinity.

=== PKD ===
A striking feature of Rap1 and the Rap1-associated signaling proteins PKD, RAPL, and Mst1 is their localization to membranes where integrins are found. This provides a mechanism by which Rap1 can act directly on integrins and modulate integrin affinity and/or clustering. PKD, RAPL, and Mst1 have also all been proposed to play a role in movement of receptors to the plasma membrane. PKD-dependent regulation of vesicular transport requires PKD kinase activity, while PKD-dependent regulation of TCR signaling to integrins does not appear to require PKD kinase activity. Thus, PKD may play a distinct role in regulating Rap1-dependent integrin regulation. For example, the PKD-dependent association of Rap1 with C3G suggests that PKD may be critical for localizing Rap1 not only with integrins but also with Rap1 GEFs. The PKD–Rap1 interaction may thus be central to the subsequent activation of Rap1 and triggering of downstream effectors such as RAPL and Mst1.

=== RIAM ===
An additional Rap1 effector provides a link between Rap1 and the actin cytoskeleton. RIAM (Rap1–GTP-interacting adapter molecule) is a broadly expressed adaptor protein that contains an RA (Ras association)-like domain, a PH domain, and several proline-rich sequences. Like RAPL, RIAM interacts preferentially with active Rap1, and overexpression of RIAM enhances integrin-mediated adhesion. In addition, knockdown of RIAM inhibits adhesion induced by active Rap1 and inhibits the localization of active Rap1 at the plasma membrane. The ability of RIAM to associate with profilin, Ena/VASP proteins, and talin suggests that RIAM promotes Rap1-dependent integrin activation through effects on the actin cytoskeleton, particularly the interaction of talin with integrin cytoplasmic tails. Given the known role of talin in regulating integrin affinity, RIAM may provide an Mst1-independent mechanism by which Rap1 regulates integrin affinity.

== Ligands ==
Activators

- CalDAG-GEFI - endogenous protein activator of Rap1

Inhibitors

- Metformin, the widely used medication for diabetes, has been found to act via inhibition of Rap1 in the ventromedial hypothalamic nucleus of the brain.
- RASA3 - endogenous protein inhibitor of Rap1
