= Neuroblastoma RAS viral oncogene homolog =

Protein found in humans

NRAS
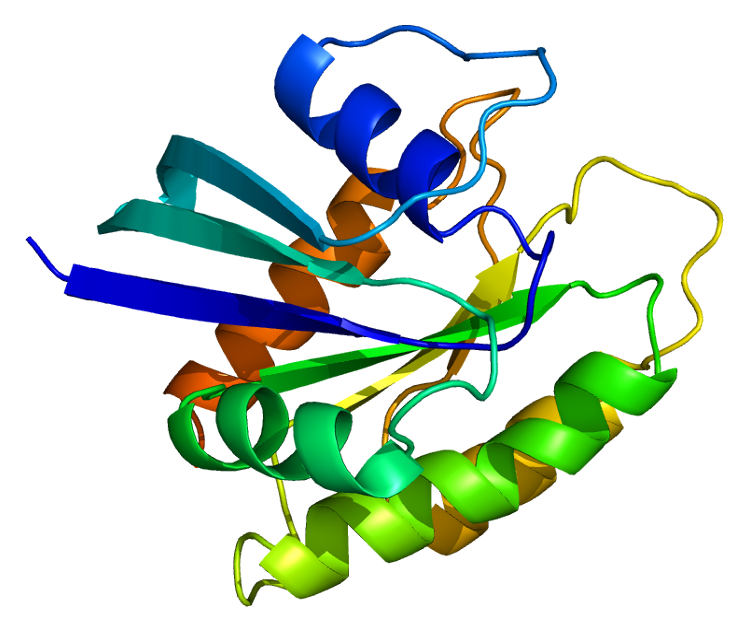

Identifiers
- Aliases: NRAS, ALPS4, CMNS, N-ras, NCMS, NRAS1, NS6, Neuroblastoma RAS viral oncogene homolog, NRAS proto-oncogene, GTPase
- External IDs: OMIM: 164790; MGI: 97376; GeneCards: NRAS
Available structures
| PDB | Ortholog search: PDBe RCSB |
| PDB | List of PDB id codes 3CON, 2N9C |
Enzyme activity
| EC # | BRENDA | ExPASy | KEGG | MetaCyc |
|---|---|---|---|---|
| 3.6.5.2 | ↗ | ↗ | ↗ | ↗ |

Gene location (Human)
| Chr. | Chromosome 1 (human) |
| Band | 1p13.2 | Start | 114,704,469 bp |
| Band | 1p13.2 | End | 114,716,771 bp |

Gene location (Mouse)
| Chr. | Chromosome 3 (mouse) |
| Band | 3 F2.2|3 45.25 cM | Start | 102,965,601 bp |
| Band | 3 F2.2|3 45.25 cM | End | 102,975,230 bp |
RNA expression pattern
| Bgee | Human / Mouse (ortholog); Top expressed in: gingival epithelium; epithelium of nasopharynx; secondary oocyte; amniotic fluid; mucosa of colon; mucosa of sigmoid colon; germinal epithelium; skin of thigh; ganglionic eminence; parietal pleura / Top expressed in: tail of embryo; genital tubercle; zygote; lactiferous gland; sciatic nerve; yolk sac; ventricular zone; corneal stroma; epithelium of lens; medial ganglionic eminence; More reference expression data |
| BioGPS | n/a |
Gene ontology
| Molecular function | nucleotide binding; protein-containing complex binding; GTP binding; GTPase activity; protein binding |
| Cellular component | Golgi apparatus; membrane; Golgi membrane; plasma membrane; extracellular exosome; tertiary granule membrane |
| Biological process | epidermal growth factor receptor signaling pathway; stimulatory C-type lectin receptor signaling pathway; MAPK cascade; axon guidance; Fc-epsilon receptor signaling pathway; Ras protein signal transduction; leukocyte migration; signal transduction; ERBB2 signaling pathway; neutrophil degranulation; positive regulation of endothelial cell proliferation |
Sources:Amigo / QuickGO
Orthologs
| Databases | NCBI: entry; OMA: entry |
| Species | Human | Mouse |
| Entrez | 4893 | 18176 |
| Ensembl | ENSG00000213281 | ENSMUSG00000027852 |
| UniProt | P01111 | P08556 |
| RefSeq (mRNA) | NM_002524 | NM_010937; NM_001368638 |
| RefSeq (protein) | NP_002515 | n/a |
| Location (UCSC) | Chr 1: 114.7 – 114.72 Mb | Chr 3: 102.97 – 102.98 Mb |
| PubMed search |
- Wikidata
| View/Edit Human | View/Edit Mouse |

NRAS is an enzyme that in humans is encoded by the NRAS gene. It was discovered by a small team of researchers led by Robin Weiss at the Institute of Cancer Research in London. It was the third RAS gene to be discovered, and was named NRAS, for its initial identification in human neuroblastoma cells.

== Function ==
The N-ras proto-oncogene is a member of the Ras gene family. It is mapped on chromosome 1, and it is activated in HL60, a promyelocytic leukemia line. The order of nearby genes is as follows: centromere—CD2—NGFB—NRAS—tel.

The mammalian Ras gene family consists of the Harvey and Kirsten Ras genes (HRAS and KRAS), an inactive pseudogene of each (c-Hras2 and c-Kras1) and the N-Ras gene. They differ significantly only in the C-terminal 40 amino acids. These Ras genes have GTP/GDP binding and GTPase activity, and their normal function may be as G-like regulatory proteins involved in the normal control of cell growth.

The N-Ras gene specifies two main transcripts of 2 kb and 4.3 kb. The difference between the two transcripts is a simple extension through the termination site of the 2 kb transcript. The N-Ras gene consists of seven exons (-I, I, II, III, IV, V, VI). The smaller 2 kb transcript contains the VIa exon, and the larger 4.3 kb transcript contains the VIb exon which is just a longer form of the VIa exon. Both transcripts encode identical proteins as they differ only the 3′ untranslated region.

== Mutations ==
Mutations which change amino acid residues 12, 13 or 61 activate the potential of N-ras to transform cultured cells and are implicated in a variety of human tumors e.g. melanoma.

=== As a drug target ===
Binimetinib (MEK162) has had a phase III clinical trial for NRAS Q61 mutant melanoma.
