= RASD2 =

Protein-coding gene in the species Homo sapiens

Identifiers
- Aliases: RASD2, MGC:4834, Rhes, TEM2, RASD family member 2
- External IDs: OMIM: 612842; MGI: 1922391; GeneCards: RASD2

Gene location (Human)
Chr.	Chromosome 22 (human)
Band	22q12.3	Start	35,540,831 bp
Band	22q12.3	End	35,553,999 bp

Gene location (Mouse)
Chr.	Chromosome 8 (mouse)
Band	8|8 C1	Start	75,940,572 bp
Band	8|8 C1	End	75,950,741 bp
RNA expression pattern
Bgee	Human / Mouse (ortholog); Top expressed in: putamen; caudate nucleus; nucleus accumbens; right frontal lobe; muscle layer of sigmoid colon; apex of heart; prefrontal cortex; Brodmann area 9; cingulate gyrus; anterior cingulate cortex / Top expressed in: superior frontal gyrus; dorsal striatum; nucleus accumbens; visual cortex; primary visual cortex; muscle of thigh; nucleus of stria terminalis; dentate gyrus of hippocampal formation granule cell; olfactory tubercle; substantia nigra; More reference expression data
BioGPS	n/a
Gene ontology
Molecular function	G-protein beta-subunit binding; nucleotide binding; GTP binding; ubiquitin conjugating enzyme binding; phosphatidylinositol 3-kinase binding; GTPase activity
Cellular component	plasma membrane; membrane
Biological process	negative regulation of protein ubiquitination; regulation of cAMP-mediated signaling; positive regulation of protein kinase B signaling; synaptic transmission, dopaminergic; positive regulation of protein sumoylation; locomotory behavior; signal transduction
Sources:Amigo / QuickGO
Orthologs
Databases	NCBI: entry; OMA: entry
Species	Human	Mouse
Entrez	23551	75141
Ensembl	ENSG00000100302	ENSMUSG00000034472
UniProt	Q96D21	P63032
RefSeq (mRNA)	NM_014310; NM_001366725; NM_001376515; NM_001376516	NM_029182
RefSeq (protein)	NP_055125; NP_001353654; NP_001363444; NP_001363445	NP_083458
Location (UCSC)	Chr 22: 35.54 – 35.55 Mb	Chr 8: 75.94 – 75.95 Mb
PubMed search
- Wikidata
View/Edit Human	View/Edit Mouse

GTP-binding protein Rhes is a protein that in humans is encoded by the RASD2 gene.

This gene encodes a Ras-related protein that is produced largely in the striatum. The product of this gene binds to GTP and possesses intrinsic GTPase activity. The gene belongs to the Ras superfamily of small GTPases. The exact function of this gene is unknown, but most striatum-specific mRNAs characterized to date encode components of signal transduction cascades.
