= RASL11B =

Protein-coding gene in the species Homo sapiens

Identifiers
- Aliases: RASL11B, RAS like family 11 member B
- External IDs: OMIM: 612404; MGI: 1916189; GeneCards: RASL11B
Enzyme activity
EC #	BRENDA	ExPASy	KEGG	MetaCyc
3.6.5.2	↗	↗	↗	↗

Gene location (Human)
Chr.	Chromosome 4 (human)
Band	4q12	Start	52,862,317 bp
Band	4q12	End	52,866,835 bp

Gene location (Mouse)
Chr.	Chromosome 5 (mouse)
Band	5|5 C3.3	Start	74,355,947 bp
Band	5|5 C3.3	End	74,360,142 bp
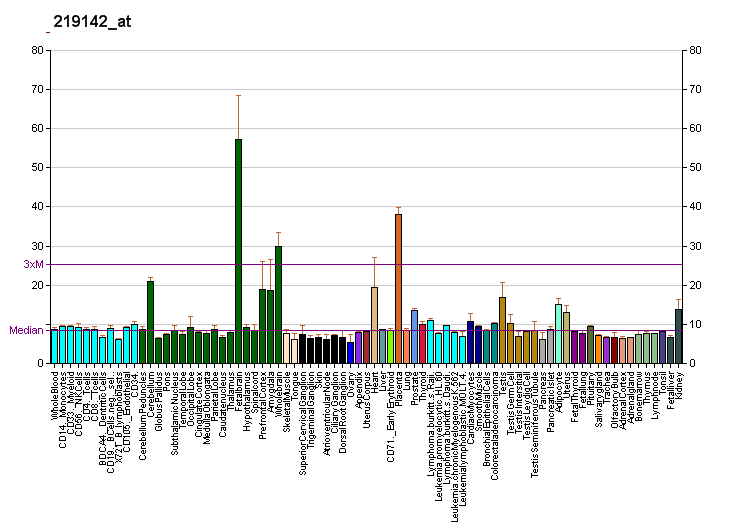
RNA expression pattern
Bgee	Human / Mouse (ortholog); Top expressed in: right ovary; left ovary; spleen; cerebellar hemisphere; right hemisphere of cerebellum; testicle; right coronary artery; ganglionic eminence; stromal cell of endometrium; prefrontal cortex / Top expressed in: transitional epithelium of urinary bladder; vas deferens; molar; endocardial cushion; lens; epithelium of lens; semi-lunar valve; medullary collecting duct; ascending aorta; Region I of hippocampus proper; More reference expression data
BioGPS	More reference expression data
Gene ontology
Molecular function	nucleotide binding; transforming growth factor beta receptor binding; GTP binding; GTPase activity
Cellular component	membrane
Biological process	negative regulation of transforming growth factor beta receptor signaling pathway; signal transduction
Sources:Amigo / QuickGO
Orthologs
Databases	NCBI: entry; OMA: entry
Species	Human	Mouse
Entrez	65997	68939
Ensembl	ENSG00000128045	ENSMUSG00000049907
UniProt	Q9BPW5	Q922H7
RefSeq (mRNA)	NM_023940	NM_026878
RefSeq (protein)	NP_076429	NP_081154
Location (UCSC)	Chr 4: 52.86 – 52.87 Mb	Chr 5: 74.36 – 74.36 Mb
PubMed search
- Wikidata
View/Edit Human	View/Edit Mouse

Ras-like protein family member 11B is a protein that in humans is encoded by the RASL11B gene.
