= RRAS =

Protein-coding gene in the species Homo sapiens

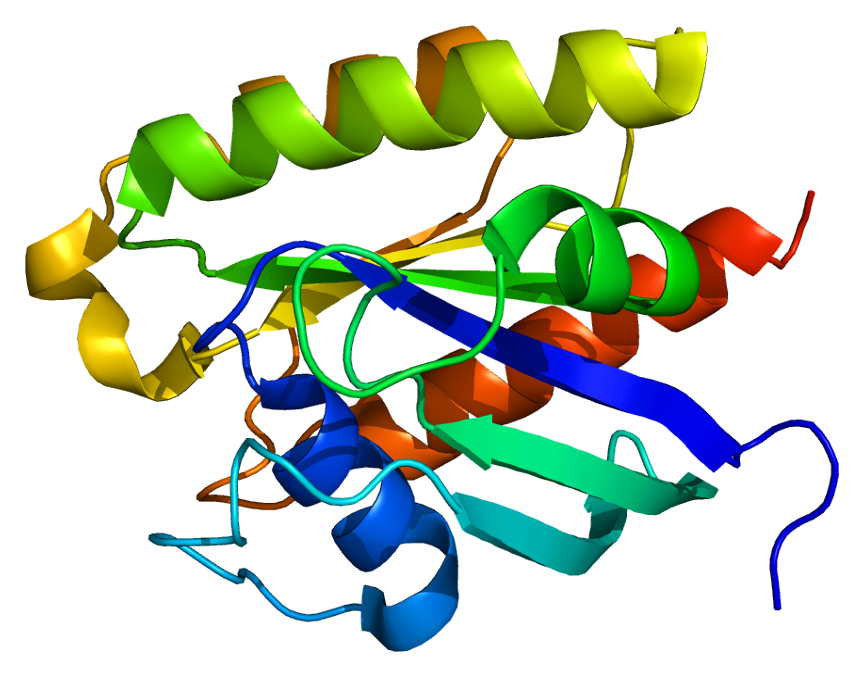

Identifiers
- Aliases: RRAS, related RAS viral (r-ras) oncogene homolog, R-Ras, RAS related
- External IDs: OMIM: 165090; MGI: 98179; GeneCards: RRAS
Available structures
PDB	Ortholog search: PDBe RCSB
PDB	List of PDB id codes 2FN4
Enzyme activity
EC #	BRENDA	ExPASy	KEGG	MetaCyc
3.6.5.2	↗	↗	↗	↗

Gene location (Human)
Chr.	Chromosome 19 (human)
Band	19q13.33	Start	49,635,292 bp
Band	19q13.33	End	49,640,143 bp

Gene location (Mouse)
Chr.	Chromosome 7 (mouse)
Band	7 B3|7 29.08 cM	Start	44,667,385 bp
Band	7 B3|7 29.08 cM	End	44,671,071 bp
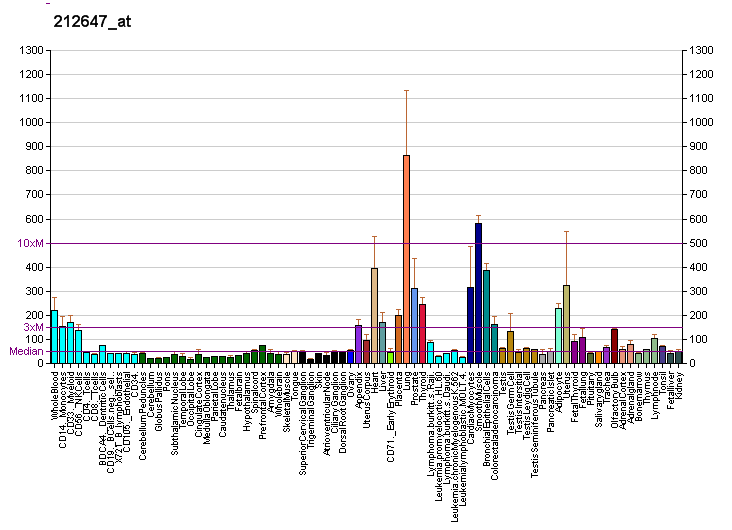
RNA expression pattern
Bgee	Human / Mouse (ortholog); Top expressed in: right coronary artery; popliteal artery; tibial arteries; thoracic aorta; ascending aorta; Descending thoracic aorta; left coronary artery; gastric mucosa; left uterine tube; muscle layer of sigmoid colon / Top expressed in: tunica media of zone of aorta; carotid body; external carotid artery; ascending aorta; right lung; white adipose tissue; right lung lobe; left lung; aortic valve; tunica adventitia of aorta; More reference expression data
BioGPS	More reference expression data
Gene ontology
Molecular function	nucleotide binding; GDP binding; protein-containing complex binding; GTP binding; protein binding; GTPase activity
Cellular component	membrane; focal adhesion; plasma membrane; extracellular exosome; intracellular anatomical structure
Biological process	positive regulation of angiogenesis; negative regulation of cell migration; regulation of protein kinase B signaling; regulation of ERK1 and ERK2 cascade; leukocyte differentiation; Ras protein signal transduction; face morphogenesis; signal transduction
Sources:Amigo / QuickGO
Orthologs
Databases	NCBI: entry; OMA: entry
Species	Human	Mouse
Entrez	6237	20130
Ensembl	ENSG00000126458	ENSMUSG00000038387
UniProt	P10301	P10833
RefSeq (mRNA)	NM_006270	NM_009101; NM_001360132; NM_001360133
RefSeq (protein)	NP_006261	NP_033127; NP_001347061; NP_001347062
Location (UCSC)	Chr 19: 49.64 – 49.64 Mb	Chr 7: 44.67 – 44.67 Mb
PubMed search
- Wikidata
View/Edit Human	View/Edit Mouse

Ras-related protein R-Ras is a protein that in humans is encoded by the RRAS gene.

== Interactions ==
RRAS has been shown to interact with:

- ARAF,
- Bcl-2,
- NCK1,
- RALGDS, and
- RASSF5.
