= RAP2A =

Protein-coding gene in the species Homo sapiens

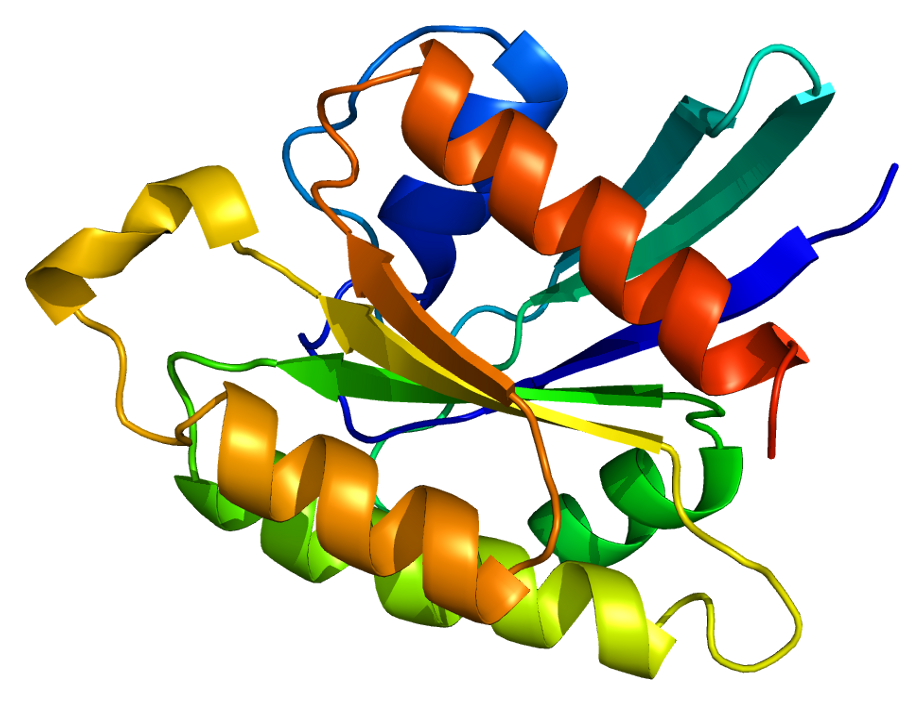

Identifiers
- Aliases: RAP2A, K-REV, KREV, RAP2, RbBP-30, member of RAS oncogene family, Rap2a
- External IDs: OMIM: 179540; MGI: 97855; GeneCards: RAP2A
Available structures
PDB	Ortholog search: PDBe RCSB
PDB	List of PDB id codes 1KAO, 2RAP, 3RAP
Enzyme activity
EC #	BRENDA	ExPASy	KEGG	MetaCyc
3.6.5.2	↗	↗	↗	↗

Gene location (Human)
Chr.	Chromosome 13 (human)
Band	13q32.1, 15q24	Start	97,434,169 bp
Band	13q32.1, 15q24	End	97,469,128 bp

Gene location (Mouse)
Chr.	Chromosome 14 (mouse)
Band	14 E4|14 64.72 cM	Start	120,715,856 bp
Band	14 E4|14 64.72 cM	End	120,744,606 bp
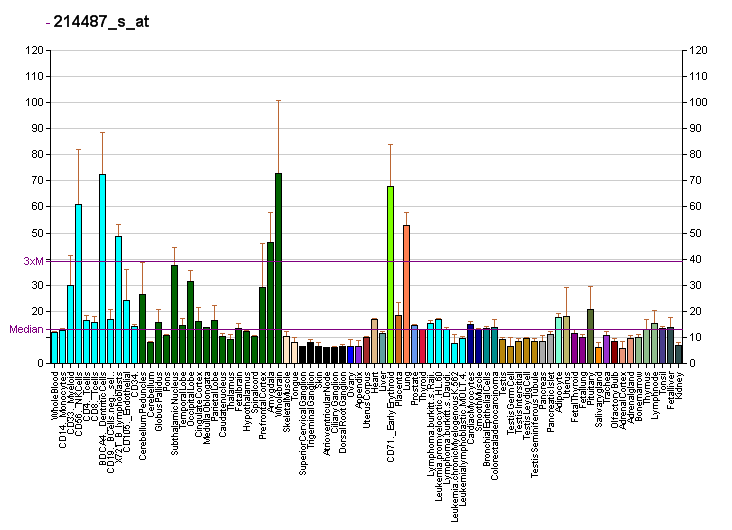

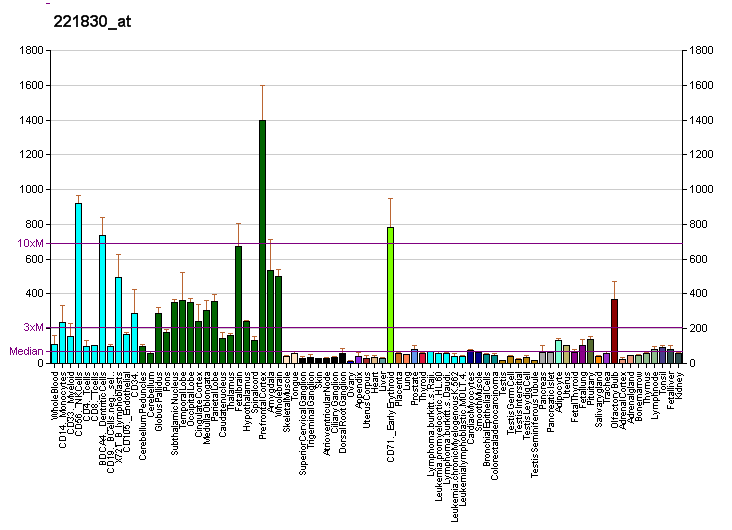
RNA expression pattern
Bgee	Human / Mouse (ortholog); Top expressed in: pons; buccal mucosa cell; internal globus pallidus; superior vestibular nucleus; subthalamic nucleus; parietal lobe; middle temporal gyrus; Brodmann area 23; inferior ganglion of vagus nerve; postcentral gyrus / Top expressed in: sciatic nerve; Region I of hippocampus proper; subiculum; left lung lobe; ventromedial nucleus; barrel cortex; anterior amygdaloid area; optic nerve; nucleus of stria terminalis; primary motor cortex; More reference expression data
BioGPS	114560/ More reference expression data
Gene ontology
Molecular function	nucleotide binding; protein binding; magnesium ion binding; GTPase activity; GTP binding; GDP binding
Cellular component	recycling endosome; cytosol; endosome; membrane; plasma membrane; recycling endosome membrane; midbody
Biological process	actin cytoskeleton reorganization; microvillus assembly; positive regulation of protein phosphorylation; establishment of protein localization; Rap protein signal transduction; regulation of dendrite morphogenesis; regulation of JNK cascade; negative regulation of cell migration; establishment of epithelial cell apical/basal polarity; positive regulation of protein autophosphorylation; protein localization to plasma membrane; signal transduction
Sources:Amigo / QuickGO
Orthologs
Databases	NCBI: entry, entry; OMA: entry
Species	Human	Mouse
Entrez	5911,114560; 5911,114560	76108
Ensembl	ENSG00000125249	ENSMUSG00000051615
UniProt	P10114; Q78P65	Q80ZJ1
RefSeq (mRNA)	NM_021033; NM_053741	NM_029519
RefSeq (protein)	NP_066361; NP_446193	NP_083795
Location (UCSC)	Chr 13: 97.43 – 97.47 Mb	Chr 14: 120.72 – 120.74 Mb
PubMed search
- Wikidata
View/Edit Human	View/Edit Mouse

Ras-related protein Rap-2a is a protein that in humans is encoded by the RAP2A gene. RAP2A is a member of the Ras-related protein family.

== Interactions ==
RAP2A has been shown to interact with RUNDC3A, RASSF5 and RALGDS.
