= NKIRAS2 =

Protein-coding gene in the species Homo sapiens

Identifiers
- Aliases: NKIRAS2, KBRAS2, kappaB-Ras2, NFKB inhibitor interacting Ras like 2
- External IDs: OMIM: 604497; MGI: 1919216; GeneCards: NKIRAS2

Gene location (Human)
Chr.	Chromosome 17 (human)
Band	17q21.2	Start	42,011,382 bp
Band	17q21.2	End	42,025,644 bp

Gene location (Mouse)
Chr.	Chromosome 11 (mouse)
Band	11|11 D	Start	100,510,070 bp
Band	11|11 D	End	100,518,433 bp
RNA expression pattern
Bgee	Human / Mouse (ortholog); Top expressed in: monocyte; ganglionic eminence; stromal cell of endometrium; gastrocnemius muscle; left ventricle; apex of heart; muscle of thigh; granulocyte; right auricle of heart; popliteal artery / Top expressed in: spermatocyte; spermatid; seminiferous tubule; granulocyte; lip; medial ganglionic eminence; right ventricle; neural tube; cornea; esophagus; More reference expression data
BioGPS	n/a
Gene ontology
Molecular function	nucleotide binding; GTP binding; GTPase activity
Cellular component	cytoplasm; membrane; cellular component
Biological process	I-kappaB kinase/NF-kappaB signaling; signal transduction
Sources:Amigo / QuickGO
Orthologs
Databases	NCBI: entry; OMA: entry
Species	Human	Mouse
Entrez	28511	71966
Ensembl	ENSG00000168256	ENSMUSG00000017837
UniProt	Q9NYR9	Q9CR56
RefSeq (mRNA)	NM_001001349; NM_001144927; NM_001144928; NM_001144929; NM_017595	NM_028024
RefSeq (protein)	NP_001001349; NP_001138399; NP_001138400; NP_001138401; NP_060065 NP_001001349.1; NP_001138399.1; NP_060065.2	NP_082300
Location (UCSC)	Chr 17: 42.01 – 42.03 Mb	Chr 11: 100.51 – 100.52 Mb
PubMed search
- Wikidata
View/Edit Human	View/Edit Mouse

NF-κB inhibitor interacting Ras-like 2 is a protein that in humans is encoded by the NKIRAS2 gene.
