= RAP1A =

Protein-coding gene in humans

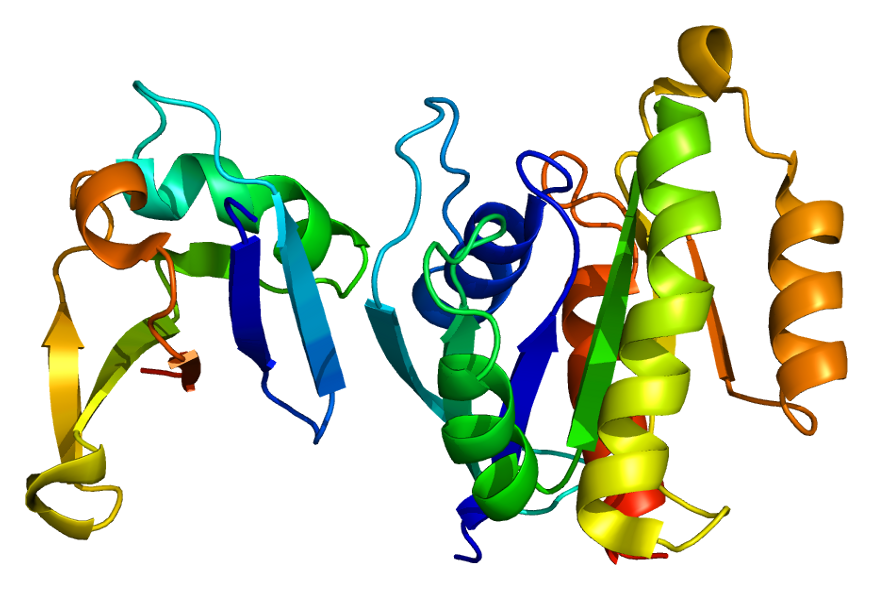

Identifiers
- Aliases: RAP1A, C21KG, G-22K, KREV-1, KREV1, RAP1, SMGP21, member of RAS oncogene family
- External IDs: OMIM: 179520; MGI: 97852; GeneCards: RAP1A
Available structures
PDB	Ortholog search: PDBe RCSB
PDB	List of PDB id codes 1C1Y, 1GUA, 3KUC, 4KVG
Enzyme activity
EC #	BRENDA	ExPASy	KEGG	MetaCyc
3.6.5.2	↗	↗	↗	↗

Gene location (Human)
Chr.	Chromosome 1 (human)
Band	1p13.2	Start	111,542,218 bp
Band	1p13.2	End	111,716,691 bp

Gene location (Mouse)
Chr.	Chromosome 3 (mouse)
Band	3 F2.2|3 46.45 cM	Start	105,634,583 bp
Band	3 F2.2|3 46.45 cM	End	105,708,652 bp
RNA expression pattern
Bgee	Human / Mouse (ortholog); Top expressed in: monocyte; tail of epididymis; superficial temporal artery; popliteal artery; tibial arteries; jejunal mucosa; muscle layer of sigmoid colon; gastric mucosa; saphenous vein; right ventricle / Top expressed in: tail of embryo; genital tubercle; jejunum; granulocyte; esophagus; stomach; thymus; placenta; dentate gyrus of hippocampal formation granule cell; duodenum; More reference expression data
BioGPS	n/a
Gene ontology
Molecular function	nucleotide binding; protein-containing complex binding; GTP binding; protein binding; GTPase activity; GDP binding
Cellular component	cytosol; endosome; membrane; myelin sheath; plasma membrane; guanyl-nucleotide exchange factor complex; neuron projection; extracellular exosome; early endosome; late endosome; cytoplasm; cell junction; perinuclear region of cytoplasm; specific granule membrane; phagocytic vesicle; glutamatergic synapse
Biological process	establishment of endothelial barrier; positive regulation of glucose import; microvillus assembly; regulation of cell junction assembly; regulation of insulin secretion; small GTPase mediated signal transduction; Rap protein signal transduction; cellular response to organic cyclic compound; nervous system development; negative regulation of synaptic vesicle exocytosis; liver regeneration; protein transport; response to antineoplastic agent; response to carbohydrate; negative regulation of collagen biosynthetic process; cellular response to glucose stimulus; signal transduction; cellular response to nerve growth factor stimulus; nerve growth factor signaling pathway; positive regulation of ERK1 and ERK2 cascade; positive regulation of protein kinase activity; positive regulation of vasculogenesis; positive regulation of GTPase activity; cellular response to cAMP; positive regulation of neuron projection development; neutrophil degranulation; positive regulation of Fc-gamma receptor signaling pathway involved in phagocytosis; regulation of neurotransmitter receptor localization to postsynaptic specialization membrane; protein localization to plasma membrane
Sources:Amigo / QuickGO
Orthologs
Databases	NCBI: entry; OMA: entry
Species	Human	Mouse
Entrez	5906	109905
Ensembl	ENSG00000116473	ENSMUSG00000068798
UniProt	P62834	P62835
RefSeq (mRNA)	NM_001010935; NM_001291896; NM_002884; NM_001370216; NM_001370217 NM_001394066	NM_145541
RefSeq (protein)	NP_001010935; NP_001278825; NP_002875; NP_001357145; NP_001357146	NP_663516
Location (UCSC)	Chr 1: 111.54 – 111.72 Mb	Chr 3: 105.63 – 105.71 Mb
PubMed search
- Wikidata
View/Edit Human	View/Edit Mouse

Ras-related protein Rap-1A is a protein that in humans is encoded by the RAP1A gene.

== Function ==
The product of this gene belongs to the family of Ras-related proteins. These proteins share approximately 50% amino acid identity with the classical RAS proteins and have numerous structural features in common. The most striking difference between RAP proteins and RAS proteins resides in their 61st amino acid: glutamine in RAS is replaced by threonine in RAP proteins. The product of this gene counteracts the mitogenic function of RAS because it can interact with RAS GAPs and RAF in a competitive manner. Two transcript variants encoding the same protein have been identified for this gene.

== Interactions ==
RAP1A has been shown to interact with:

- C-Raf,
- MLLT4,
- PDE6D,
- RALGDS,
- RAPGEF2, and
- TSC2.
