= ICMT =

Protein-coding gene in humans

Identifiers
- Aliases: ICMT, HSTE14, MST098, MSTP098, PCCMT, PCMT, PPMT, isoprenylcysteine carboxyl methyltransferase, ICMT protein, human
- External IDs: OMIM: 605851; MGI: 1888594; GeneCards: ICMT
Enzyme activity
EC #	BRENDA	ExPASy	KEGG	MetaCyc
2.1.1.100	↗	↗	↗	↗

Gene location (Human)
Chr.	Chromosome 1 (human)
Band	1p36.31	Start	6,221,193 bp
Band	1p36.31	End	6,235,972 bp

Gene location (Mouse)
Chr.	Chromosome 4 (mouse)
Band	4|4 E2	Start	152,297,227 bp
Band	4|4 E2	End	152,307,121 bp
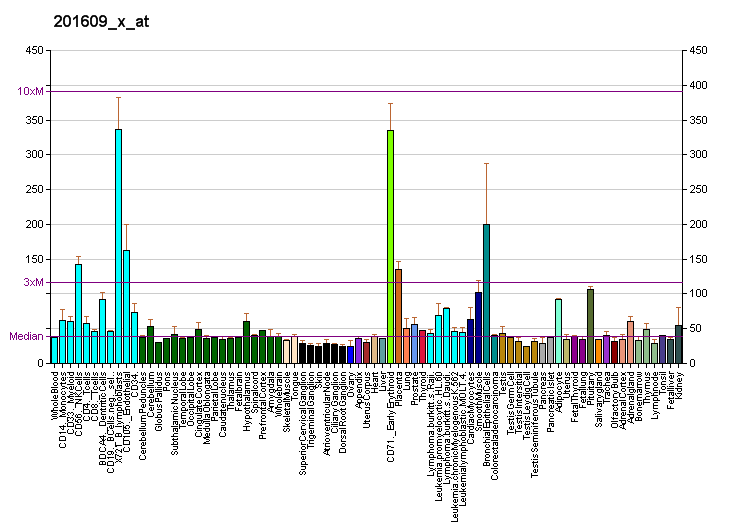

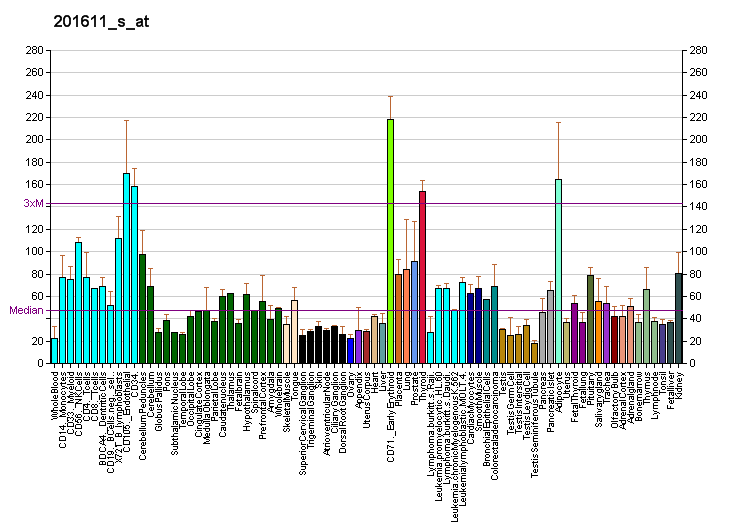

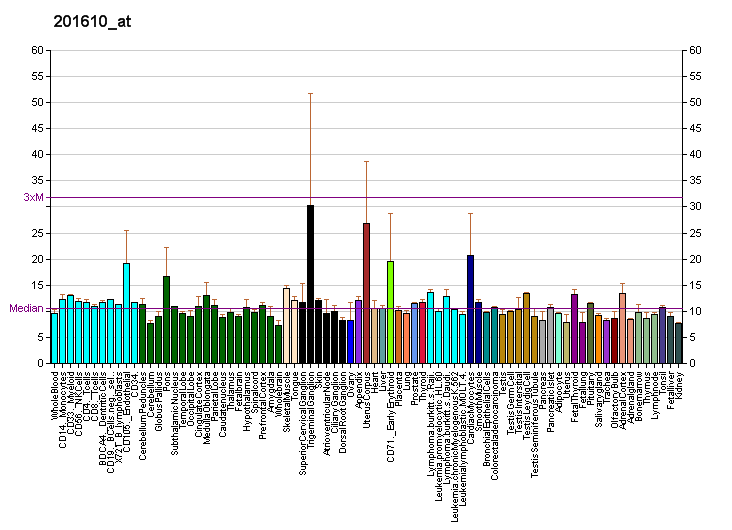
RNA expression pattern
Bgee	Human / Mouse (ortholog); Top expressed in: thoracic diaphragm; stromal cell of endometrium; body of tongue; olfactory zone of nasal mucosa; gastrocnemius muscle; islet of Langerhans; nasal epithelium; right ventricle; glutes; muscle of thigh / Top expressed in: neural layer of retina; lobe of cerebellum; cerebellar vermis; spermatocyte; lumbar spinal ganglion; spermatid; retinal pigment epithelium; lip; dentate gyrus of hippocampal formation granule cell; right kidney; More reference expression data
BioGPS	More reference expression data
Gene ontology
Molecular function	methyltransferase activity; transferase activity; protein C-terminal carboxyl O-methyltransferase activity; protein C-terminal S-isoprenylcysteine carboxyl O-methyltransferase activity
Cellular component	integral component of membrane; endoplasmic reticulum membrane; endoplasmic reticulum; membrane
Biological process	post-translational protein modification; methylation; protein targeting to membrane; C-terminal protein methylation
Sources:Amigo / QuickGO
Orthologs
Databases	NCBI: entry; OMA: entry
Species	Human	Mouse
Entrez	23463	57295
Ensembl	ENSG00000116237	ENSMUSG00000039662
UniProt	O60725	Q9EQK7
RefSeq (mRNA)	NM_012405; NM_170705	NM_133788
RefSeq (protein)	NP_036537	NP_598549
Location (UCSC)	Chr 1: 6.22 – 6.24 Mb	Chr 4: 152.3 – 152.31 Mb
PubMed search
- Wikidata
View/Edit Human	View/Edit Mouse

Protein-S-isoprenylcysteine O-methyltransferase is an enzyme that in humans is encoded by the ICMT gene.

This gene encodes the third of three enzymes that posttranslationally modify isoprenylated C-terminal cysteine residues in certain proteins and target those proteins to the cell membrane. This enzyme localizes to the endoplasmic reticulum. Alternative splicing may result in other transcript variants, but the biological validity of those transcripts has not been determined.
