= HRAS =

Protein-coding gene in humans

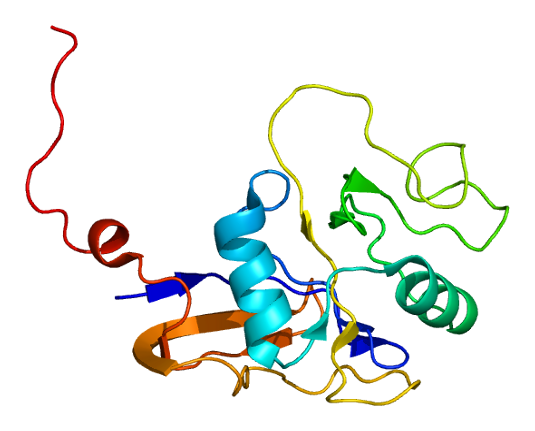

Identifiers
- Aliases: HRAS, C-BAS/HAS, C-H-RAS, C-HA-RAS1, CTLO, H-RASIDX, HAMSV, HRAS1, RASH1, p21ras, Harvey rat sarcoma viral oncogene homolog, HRas proto-oncogene, GTPase, RASK2
- External IDs: OMIM: 190020; MGI: 96224; GeneCards: HRAS
Available structures
PDB	Ortholog search: PDBe RCSB
PDB	List of PDB id codes 121P, 1AA9, 1AGP, 1BKD, 1CLU, 1CRP, 1CRQ, 1CRR, 1CTQ, 1GNP, 1GNQ, 1GNR, 1HE8, 1IAQ, 1IOZ, 1JAH, 1JAI, 1K8R, 1LF0, 1LF5, 1LFD, 1NVU, 1NVV, 1NVW, 1NVX, 1P2S, 1P2T, 1P2U, 1P2V, 1PLJ, 1PLK, 1PLL, 1Q21, 1QRA, 1RVD, 1WQ1, 1XCM, 1XD2, 1XJ0, 1ZVQ, 1ZW6, 221P, 2C5L, 2CE2, 2CL0, 2CL6, 2CL7, 2CLC, 2CLD, 2EVW, 2LCF, 2LWI, 2Q21, 2QUZ, 2RGA, 2RGB, 2RGC, 2RGD, 2RGE, 2RGG, 2UZI, 2VH5, 2X1V, 3DDC, 3I3S, 3K8Y, 3K9L, 3K9N, 3KKM, 3KKN, 3KUD, 3L8Y, 3L8Z, 3LBH, 3LBI, 3LBN, 3LO5, 3OIU, 3OIV, 3OIW, 3RRY, 3RRZ, 3RS0, 3RS2, 3RS3, 3RS4, 3RS5, 3RS7, 3RSL, 3RSO, 421P, 4DLR, 4DLS, 4DLT, 4DLU, 4DLV, 4DLW, 4DLX, 4DLY, 4DLZ, 4EFL, 4EFM, 4EFN, 4G0N, 4G3X, 4K81, 4Q21, 521P, 5P21, 621P, 6Q21, 721P, 821P, 4L9S, 4L9W, 4NYI, 4NYJ, 4NYM, 4URU, 4URV, 4URW, 4URX, 4URY, 4URZ, 4US0, 4US1, 4US2, 2N42, 2N46, 4XVQ, 4XVR, 4RSG, 5B30
Enzyme activity
EC #	BRENDA	ExPASy	KEGG	MetaCyc
3.6.5.2	↗	↗	↗	↗

Gene location (Human)
Chr.	Chromosome 11 (human)
Band	11p15.5	Start	532,242 bp
Band	11p15.5	End	537,321 bp

Gene location (Mouse)
Chr.	Chromosome 7 (mouse)
Band	7 F5|7 86.48 cM	Start	140,769,018 bp
Band	7 F5|7 86.48 cM	End	140,773,918 bp
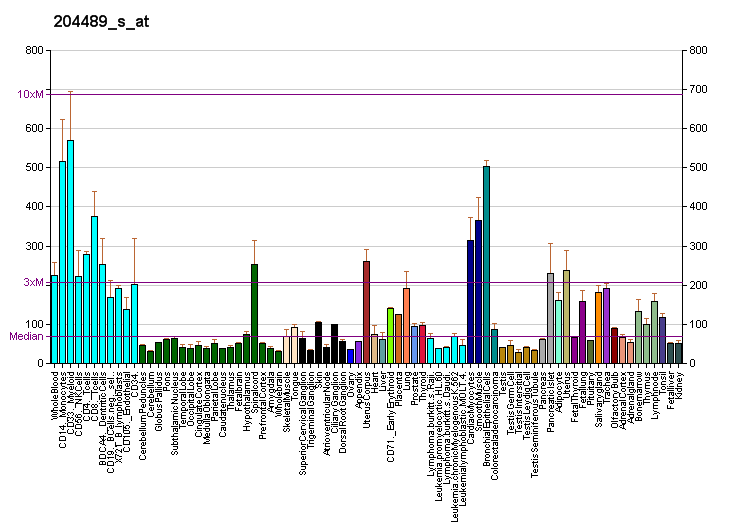

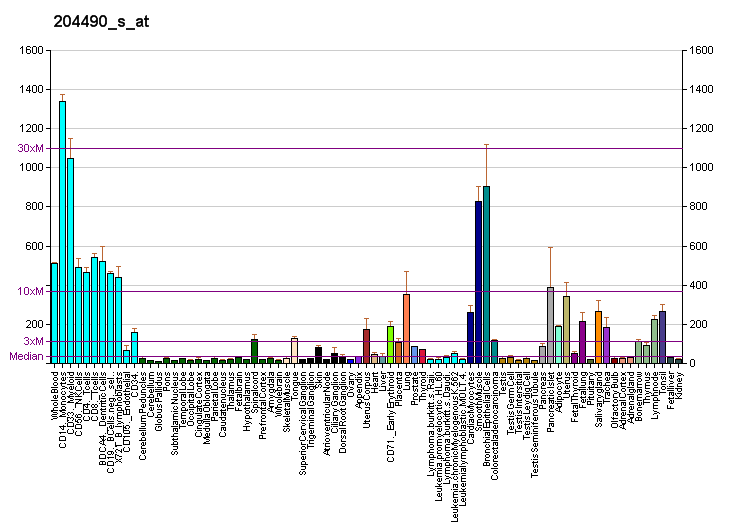

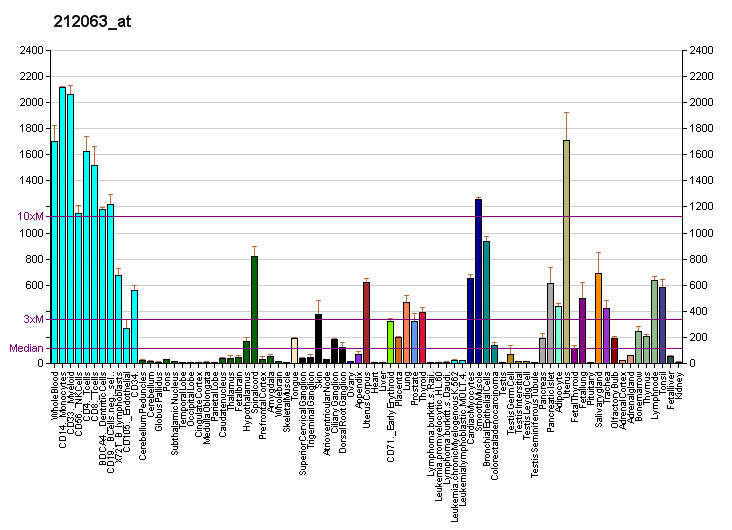
RNA expression pattern
Bgee	Human / Mouse (ortholog); Top expressed in: skin of abdomen; skin of leg; putamen; caudate nucleus; nucleus accumbens; hypothalamus; temporal lobe; amygdala; right hemisphere of cerebellum; substantia nigra / Top expressed in: dentate gyrus of hippocampal formation granule cell; lip; molar; superior frontal gyrus; esophagus; fetal liver hematopoietic progenitor cell; yolk sac; entorhinal cortex; perirhinal cortex; muscle of thigh; More reference expression data
BioGPS	More reference expression data
Gene ontology
Molecular function	nucleotide binding; protein C-terminus binding; protein binding; GTPase activity; GTP binding; GDP binding
Cellular component	cytoplasm; cytosol; Golgi apparatus; intracellular membrane-bounded organelle; membrane; Golgi membrane; plasma membrane; perinuclear region of cytoplasm; nucleus; glutamatergic synapse
Biological process	negative regulation of neuron apoptotic process; defense response to protozoan; positive regulation of protein phosphorylation; regulation of long-term neuronal synaptic plasticity; endocytosis; positive regulation of MAP kinase activity; positive regulation of miRNA metabolic process; positive regulation of epithelial cell proliferation; positive regulation of ruffle assembly; mitotic cell cycle checkpoint signaling; positive regulation of cell migration; ephrin receptor signaling pathway; positive regulation of wound healing; positive regulation of Ras protein signal transduction; positive regulation of interferon-gamma production; stimulatory C-type lectin receptor signaling pathway; positive regulation of JNK cascade; negative regulation of gene expression; MAPK cascade; intrinsic apoptotic signaling pathway; positive regulation of GTPase activity; chemotaxis; cell surface receptor signaling pathway; positive regulation of gene expression; negative regulation of GTPase activity; positive regulation of cell population proliferation; positive regulation of ERK1 and ERK2 cascade; animal organ morphogenesis; T-helper 1 type immune response; Ras protein signal transduction; cell population proliferation; T cell receptor signaling pathway; positive regulation of actin cytoskeleton reorganization; positive regulation of MAPK cascade; negative regulation of cell population proliferation; positive regulation of transcription by RNA polymerase II; signal transduction; apoptotic process; small GTPase mediated signal transduction; cellular senescence; response to isolation stress; cellular response to gamma radiation; positive regulation of DNA replication; positive regulation of phospholipase C activity; protein heterooligomerization; positive regulation of protein targeting to membrane; regulation of neurotransmitter receptor localization to postsynaptic specialization membrane
Sources:Amigo / QuickGO
Orthologs
Databases	NCBI: entry; OMA: entry
Species	Human	Mouse
Entrez	3265	15461
Ensembl	ENSG00000276536; ENSG00000174775	ENSMUSG00000025499
UniProt	P01112	Q61411
RefSeq (mRNA)	NM_001130442; NM_005343; NM_176795; NM_001318054	NM_001130443; NM_001130444; NM_008284
RefSeq (protein)	NP_001123914; NP_001304983; NP_005334; NP_789765	NP_001123915; NP_001123916; NP_032310
Location (UCSC)	Chr 11: 0.53 – 0.54 Mb	Chr 7: 140.77 – 140.77 Mb
PubMed search
- Wikidata
View/Edit Human	View/Edit Mouse

GTPase HRas, also known as the "Harvey Rat sarcoma viral oncogene homolog" and transforming protein p21, is an enzyme that in humans is encoded by the HRAS gene. The HRAS gene is located on the short (p) arm of chromosome 11 at band 15.5(11p15.5), spanning base pair 522,241 to 525,549. HRas is a small G protein in the Ras subfamily of the Ras superfamily of small GTPases. Once bound to guanosine triphosphate, H-Ras will activate a Raf kinase like c-Raf, the next step in the MAPK/ERK pathway.

The gene was initially identified as a viral oncogene in the Harvey rat sarcome virus (Harvey murine sarcoma virus, Gammaretrovirus Hamursar), hence its name. The gene carried by this virus was later discovered to closely resemble a normal cellular gene found in many animals. This led researchers to conclude that the virus had captured this cellular gene at some point in its evolutionary history. Once incorporated, the gene gave the virus the ability to disrupt normal cell growth, making it oncovirus. Incorporation of cellular genes happens regularly in retroviruses; when a key regulatory gene such as HRAS is incorporated, it may become oncogenic as the virus continues to evolve. The benign version in the cellular genome is not directly cancerous, but further mutations can turn it cancerous. As a result, the cellular version is called a proto-oncogene.

== Function ==
GTPase HRas helps regulate cell division in response to growth factor stimulation. Growth factors bind to receptors on the cell surface, which span the plasma membrane. Once activated, receptors stimulate signal transduction events in the cytoplasm, a process in which proteins and second messengers relay signals from outside the cell to the cell nucleus and instruct the cell to grow or divide. The HRAS protein is a GTPase that acts early in many signal transduction pathways and is usually associated with cell membranes due to the presence of an isoprenyl group on its C-terminus. HRAS acts as a molecular on/off switch. Once it is turned on, it recruits and activates proteins necessary for the propagation of the receptor's signal, such as c-Raf and PI 3-kinase. HRAS binds to GTP in the active state and possesses an intrinsic enzymatic activity that hydrolyses GTP to GDP and inorganic phosphate. Upon conversion of GTP to GDP, HRAS is turned off. The rate of conversion is usually slow but can be sped up dramatically by a GTPase-activating protein (GAP) class (for example, RasGAP). HRAS can in turn bind to proteins of the guanine nucleotide exchange factor (GEF) class (for example SOS1), which forces the release of bound nucleotide. Subsequently, GTP present in the cytosol binds and HRAS-GTP dissociates from the GEF, resulting in HRAS activation.

HRAS is in the Ras family, which also includes two other proto-oncogenes KRAS and NRAS. These proteins all are regulated in the same manner and appear to differ largely in their sites of action within the cell.

== Clinical significance ==
=== Costello syndrome ===
At least five inherited mutations in the HRAS gene have been identified in people with Costello syndrome. Each of these mutations changes an amino acid in a critical region of the HRAS protein. The most common mutation replaces the amino acid glycine with serine at position 12 (written as Gly12Ser or G12S). The mutations responsible for Costello syndrome lead to the production of an HRAS protein that is permanently active. Instead of triggering cell growth in response to particular signals from outside the cell, the overactive protein directs cells to grow and divide constantly. This uncontrolled cell division can result in the formation of noncancerous and cancerous tumors. Researchers are uncertain about how mutations in the HRAS gene cause the other features of Costello syndrome (such as intellectual disability, distinctive facial features, and heart problems), but many of the signs and symptoms probably result from cell overgrowth and abnormal cell development during critical periods of growth.

=== Bladder cancer ===
HRAS has been shown to be a proto-oncogene. When mutated, proto-oncogenes have the potential to cause normal cells to become cancerous. Some gene mutations are acquired during a person's lifetime and are present only in certain cells. These changes are called somatic mutations and are not inherited. Somatic mutations in the HRAS gene in bladder cells have been associated with bladder cancer. One specific mutation has been identified in a significant percentage of bladder tumors; this mutation substitutes one amino acid for another in the HRAS protein. Specifically, the mutation replaces the amino acid glycine with the amino acid valine at position 12 (written as Gly12Val, G12V, or H-RasV^{12}). The altered HRAS protein is permanently activated within the cell. This overactive protein directs the cell to grow and divide in the absence of outside signals, leading to uncontrolled cell division and the formation of a tumor. Mutations in the HRAS gene also have been associated with the progression of bladder cancer and an increased risk of tumor recurrence after treatment.

=== Other cancers ===
Somatic mutations in the HRAS gene are probably involved in the development of several other types of cancer. These mutations lead to an HRAS protein that is always active and can direct cells to grow and divide without control. Recent studies suggest that HRAS mutations are common in thyroid, salivary duct carcinoma, epithelial-myoepithelial carcinoma, and kidney cancers. A DNA copy-number gain in a segment containing HRAS has been identified as part of a genome-wide pattern, which was found to be correlated with an astrocytoma patient's outcome. The HRAS protein may also be produced at higher levels (overexpressed) in other types of cancer cells.
