= Divarasib =

Identifiers
- IUPAC name: 1-{(3S)-4-[(7M)-7-[6-amino-4-methyl-3-(trifluoromethyl)pyridin-2-yl]-6-chloro-8-fluoro-2-{[(2S)-1-methylpyrrolidin-2-yl]methoxy}quinazolin-4-yl]-3-methylpiperazin-1-yl}prop-2-en-1-one
- CAS Number: 2417987-45-0
- PubChem CID: 146624881
- DrugBank: DB17488
- ChemSpider: 115010506
- UNII: E6S21PVT91
- ChEMBL: ChEMBL5095236

Chemical and physical data
- Formula: C_{29}H_{32}ClF_{4}N_{7}O_{2}
- Molar mass: 622.07 g·mol^{−1}
- 3D model (JSmol): Interactive image
- SMILES: C[C@H]1CN(CCN1C2=NC(=NC3=C(C(=C(C=C32)Cl)C4=C(C(=CC(=N4)N)C)C(F)(F)F)F)OC[C@@H]5CCCN5C)C(=O)C=C
- InChI: InChI=1S/C29H32ClF4N7O2/c1-5-21(42)40-9-10-41(16(3)13-40)27-18-12-19(30)22(26-23(29(32,33)34)15(2)11-20(35)36-26)24(31)25(18)37-28(38-27)43-14-17-7-6-8-39(17)4/h5,11-12,16-17H,1,6-10,13-14H2,2-4H3,(H2,35,36)/t16-,17-/m0/s1; Key:ZRBPIAWWRPFDPY-IRXDYDNUSA-N

Divarasib (GDC-6036) is an experimental anticancer drug which acts as an inhibitor of the G12C mutant form of Kirsten rat sarcoma virus oncogene homologue (KRAS), an oncogene commonly present in several forms of cancer. It is in clinical trials studying its toxicity and efficacy against various types of cancer, including colorectal cancer, lung cancer and advanced solid tumors. In a phase 3 trial evaluating efficacy as second-line therapy for patients with metastatic KRAS G12C mutant non-small cell lung cancer, it demonstrated superior progression-free survival and overall survival compared with a control arm of either sotorasib or adagrasib.

== See also ==
- ACBI3
- Adagrasib
- MRTX1133
- Olomorasib
- RMC-9805
- Sotorasib
