= Olomorasib =

Clinical data
- Other names: LY3537982

Identifiers
- IUPAC name: (4M)-2-amino-4-[(4aS)-8-chloro-10-fluoro-12-oxo-3-(prop-2-enoyl)-2,3,4,4a,5,6-hexahydro-1H,12H-pyrazino[2,1-d][1,5]benzoxazocin-9-yl]-7-fluoro-1-benzothiophene-3-carbonitrile
- CAS Number: 2649788-46-3
- PubChem CID: 156472638
- ChemSpider: 115009373
- UNII: C2VJ83PSN7
- KEGG: D12853

Chemical and physical data
- Formula: C_{25}H_{19}ClF_{2}N_{4}O_{3}S
- Molar mass: 528.96 g·mol^{−1}
- 3D model (JSmol): Interactive image
- SMILES: C=CC(=O)N1CCN2[C@H](C1)CCOC3=C(C(=C(C=C3C2=O)F)C4=C5C(=C(SC5=C(C=C4)F)N)C#N)Cl
- InChI: InChI=1S/C25H19ClF2N4O3S/c1-2-18(33)31-6-7-32-12(11-31)5-8-35-22-14(25(32)34)9-17(28)20(21(22)26)13-3-4-16(27)23-19(13)15(10-29)24(30)36-23/h2-4,9,12H,1,5-8,11,30H2/t12-/m0/s1; Key:OZUPICRWMLEFCS-LBPRGKRZSA-N

Olomorasib (LY3537982) is an experimental anticancer drug which acts as an inhibitor of the G12C mutant form of Kirsten rat sarcoma virus (KRAS), an oncogene commonly present in several forms of cancer. It is in early stage clinical trials against lung and colorectal cancers and advanced solid tumors.

== See also ==
- ACBI3
- Adagrasib
- Divarasib
- MRTX1133
- Zoldonrasib
- Sotorasib
