= ACBI3 =

Experimental anticancer drug

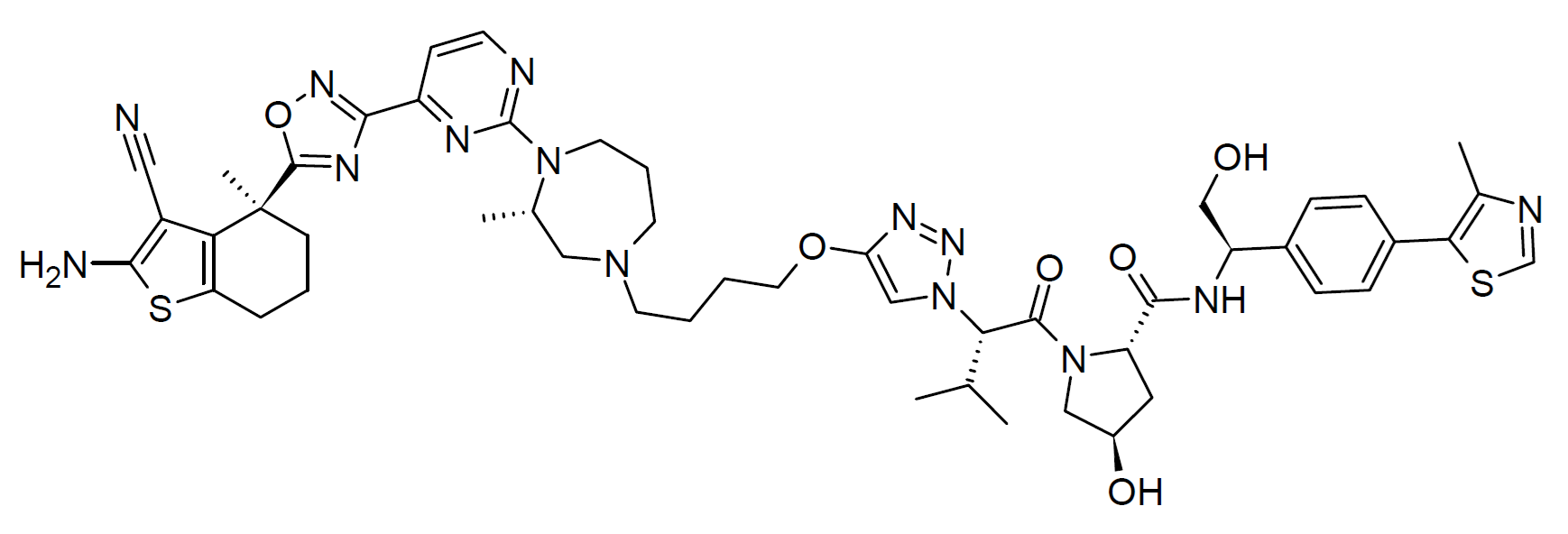

Identifiers
- IUPAC name: (2S,4R)-1-[(2S)-2-[4-[4-[(3S)-4-[4-[5-[(4S)-2-amino-3-cyano-4-methyl-6,7-dihydro-5H-1-benzothiophen-4-yl]-1,2,4-oxadiazol-3-yl]pyrimidin-2-yl]-3-methyl-1,4-diazepan-1-yl]butoxy]triazol-1-yl]-3-methylbutanoyl]-4-hydroxy-N-[(1R)-2-hydroxy-1-[4-(4-methyl-1,3-thiazol-5-yl)phenyl]ethyl]pyrrolidine-2-carboxamide
- CAS Number: 2938169-76-5
- PubChem CID: 169449364
- ChemSpider: 129422922

Chemical and physical data
- Formula: C_{50}H_{62}N_{14}O_{6}S_{2}
- Molar mass: 1019.26 g·mol^{−1}
- 3D model (JSmol): Interactive image
- SMILES: C[C@H]1CN(CCCN1C2=NC=CC(=N2)C3=NOC(=N3)[C@]4(CCCC5=C4C(=C(S5)N)C#N)C)CCCCOC6=CN(N=N6)[C@@H](C(C)C)C(=O)N7C[C@@H](C[C@H]7C(=O)N[C@@H](CO)C8=CC=C(C=C8)C9=C(N=CS9)C)O
- InChI: InChI=1S/C50H62N14O6S2/c1-29(2)42(47(68)63-25-34(66)22-38(63)46(67)55-37(27-65)32-11-13-33(14-12-32)43-31(4)54-28-71-43)64-26-40(58-60-64)69-21-7-6-18-61-19-9-20-62(30(3)24-61)49-53-17-15-36(56-49)45-57-48(70-59-45)50(5)16-8-10-39-41(50)35(23-51)44(52)72-39/h11-15,17,26,28-30,34,37-38,42,65-66H,6-10,16,18-22,24-25,27,52H2,1-5H3,(H,55,67)/t30-,34+,37-,38-,42-,50-/m0/s1; Key:DQRZNYPHOWVXPQ-YDUPODKQSA-N

ACBI3 is an experimental anticancer agent which is one of the first examples of a proteolysis targeting chimera (PROTAC) against the protein KRAS.

Being a PROTAC, it is a bifunctional molecule with two halves joined by a linker; one half binds to its target, KRAS which is a key driver in certain types of cancer, while the other half binds E3 ligase which triggers the cell's natural protein degradation mechanisms. This causes the KRAS protein to be degraded.

In early stage testing, it was able to target 13 of the 17 most common mutated forms of KRAS found in cancer cells, allowing selective targeting of a wide range of cancer types. While this particular molecule is still at an early developmental stage, it is an important proof of concept that KRAS can be targeted with a PROTAC.

== See also ==
- Adagrasib
- K-Ras(G12C) inhibitor 6
- MRTX1133
- Olomorasib
- RMC-9805
- Sotorasib
- SD36
