= BI 1701963 =

Legal status
- Legal status: Investigational

Identifiers
- CAS Number: 2752322-35-1

BI 1701963 is an investigational drug that blocks KRAS activation by binding to SOS1 proteins. The drug is thought to be effective in cancers with a KRAS mutation. It has been tested in clinical trials alone and in combination with adagrasib.
