= SIAIS562055 =

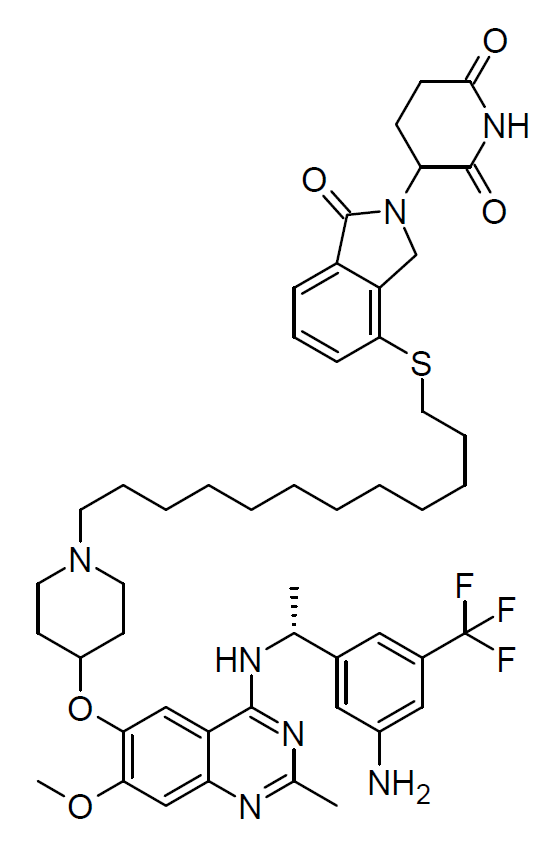

Identifiers
- IUPAC name: 3-[4-[[12-[4-[[4-[[(1R)-1-[3-amino-5-(trifluoromethyl)phenyl]ethyl]amino]-7-methoxy-2-methyl-6-quinazolinyl]oxy]-1-piperidinyl]dodecyl]thio]-1,3-dihydro-1-oxo-2H-isoindol-2-yl]-2,6-piperidinedione
- ChemSpider: 133324768

Chemical and physical data
- Formula: C_{49}H_{62}F_{3}N_{7}O_{5}S
- Molar mass: 918.13 g·mol^{−1}
- 3D model (JSmol): Interactive image
- SMILES: O=C1N(Cc2c(SCCCCCCCCCCCCN3CCC(Oc4cc5c(nc(C)nc5cc4OC)N[C@H](C)c4cc(N)cc(c4)C(F)(F)F)CC3)cccc12)C1CCC(=O)NC1=O

SIAIS562055 is an experimental anticancer drug which acts as a proteolysis targeting chimera (PROTAC) against the protein SOS1, acting by targeting this protein for destruction by cell maintenance enzymes. It was derived from the selective SOS1 inhibitor BI-3406. It is being researched for the treatment of some forms of leukemia as well as other cancers.

== See also ==
- ACBI3
- SD36
