= Zoldonrasib =

Chemical compound

Clinical data
- Pronunciation: /ˌzɒldɒnˈræsɪb/ ZOL-don-RAS-ib
- Other names: RMC-9805
- Drug class: Antineoplastic agents

Identifiers
- IUPAC name: (2S)-2-cyclopentyl-2-{(5S)-7-[(2R,3R)-3-cyclopropyl-1-methylaziridine-2-carbonyl]-2,7-diazaspiro[4.4]nonan-2-yl}-N-[(1^{2}M,2^{2}S,4S,6^{3}S)-1^{2}-{5-(4-cyclopropylpiperazin-1-yl)-2-[(1S)-1-methoxyethyl]pyridin-3-yl}-10,10-dimethyl-5,7-dioxo-1^{1}-(2,2,2-trifluoroethyl)-1^{1}H-8-oxa-1(5,3)-indola-2(4,2)-morpholina-6(1,3)-[1,2]diazinanacycloundecaphan-4-yl]acetamide
- CAS Number: 2922732-54-3
- PubChem CID: 168201327
- ChemSpider: 128942583
- UNII: XJ52BWK3XE
- KEGG: D13250

Chemical and physical data
- Formula: C_{63}H_{88}F_{3}N_{11}O_{7}
- Molar mass: 1168.462 g·mol^{−1}
- 3D model (JSmol): Interactive image
- SMILES: O=C(N1CCC[C@@H]2N1)[C@H](C[C@@H](C3)OCCN3C4=CC5=C(N(CC(F)(F)F)[C@]([C@]6=C([C@H](C)OC)N=CC(N7CCN(C8CC8)CC7)=C6)=C5CC(C)(C)COC2=O)C=C4)NC([C@@H](N9C[C@]%10(CN(C([C@@H]%11N(C)[C@@H]%11C%12CC%12)=O)CC%10)CC9)C%13CCCC%13)=O
- InChI: InChI=InChI=1S/C63H88F3N11O7/c1-39(82-5)52-47(30-44(33-67-52)72-25-23-71(24-26-72)42-14-15-42)55-48-32-61(2,3)38-84-60(81)49-11-8-20-77(69-49)58(79)50(31-45-34-73(27-28-83-45)43-16-17-51(46(48)29-43)76(55)37-63(64,65)66)68-57(78)54(40-9-6-7-10-40)74-21-18-62(35-74)19-22-75(36-62)59(80)56-53(70(56)4)41-12-13-41/h16-17,29-30,33,39-42,45,49-50,53-54,56,69H,6-15,18-28,31-32,34-38H2,1-5H3,(H,68,78)/t39?,45-,49-,50-,53+,54-,56+,62-,70?/m0/s1; Key:VKNNQJWNUPSOEK-QFVODIEJSA-N

Zoldonrasib, also known as RMC-9805, is an investigational drug that selectively targets the G12D mutation in KRAS dependent cancers. Zoldonrasib functions as molecular glue that forms a non-covalent ligand-mediated protein-protein interaction between cyclophilin A and GTP-bound RAS. Subsequent covalent modification of the mutant Asp12 residue affords selectivity over wild-type RAS.

As of 2025, zoldonrasib is in a phase 1/1b clinical trial for the treatment of KRAS G12D-mutant solid tumors. Preliminary data indicated that KRAS G12D–mutant PDAC patients dosed at 1200 mg daily or 600 mg twice daily achieved a 30% objective response rate (n = 12) and 80% disease control rate (n = 32).

== See also ==
- ACBI3
- Adagrasib
- MRTX1133
- Olomorasib
- Sotorasib
- Daraxonrasib
