= Opnurasib =

Chemical compound

Identifiers
- IUPAC name: 1-[6-[4-(5-Chloro-6-methyl-1H-indazol-4-yl)-5-methyl-3-(1-methylindazol-5-yl)pyrazol-1-yl]-2-azaspiro[3.3]heptan-2-yl]prop-2-en-1-one
- CAS Number: 2653994-08-0
- PubChem CID: 156501355
- ChemSpider: 115007151
- UNII: Q3W0H3V1LQ
- KEGG: D13038
- ChEMBL: ChEMBL5077861

Chemical and physical data
- Formula: C_{29}H_{28}ClN_{7}O
- Molar mass: 526.04 g·mol^{−1}
- 3D model (JSmol): Interactive image
- SMILES: CC1=CC2=C(C=NN2)C(=C1Cl)C3=C(N(N=C3C4=CC5=C(C=C4)N(N=C5)C)C6CC7(C6)CN(C7)C(=O)C=C)C
- InChI: InChI=1S/C29H28ClN7O/c1-5-24(38)36-14-29(15-36)10-20(11-29)37-17(3)25(26-21-13-31-33-22(21)8-16(2)27(26)30)28(34-37)18-6-7-23-19(9-18)12-32-35(23)4/h5-9,12-13,20H,1,10-11,14-15H2,2-4H3,(H,31,33); Key:AZUYLZMQTIKGSC-UHFFFAOYSA-N

Opnurasib (JDQ-443) is a small-molecule covalent KRASG12C inhibitor developed for non-small-cell lung cancer.
