= MRTX1133 =

Chemical compound

Clinical data
- Drug class: Antineoplastic agents
- ATC code: L01XX77 (WHO)

Identifiers
- IUPAC name: 4-(4-(3,8-Diazabicyclo[3.2.1]octan-3-yl)-8-fluoro-2-(((2R,7aS)-2-fluorohexahydro-1H-pyrrolizin-7a-yl)methoxy)pyrido[4,3-d]pyrimidin-7-yl)-5-ethynyl-6-fluoronaphthalen-2-ol
- CAS Number: 2621928-55-8
- PubChem CID: 156124857
- ChemSpider: 114876735
- UNII: DU32DM9CHD
- ChEBI: CHEBI:746962
- ChEMBL: ChEMBL4858364
- PDB ligand: 6IC (PDBe, RCSB PDB)

Chemical and physical data
- Formula: C_{33}H_{31}F_{3}N_{6}O_{2}
- Molar mass: 600.646 g·mol^{−1}
- 3D model (JSmol): Interactive image
- SMILES: C#CC1=C(C=CC2=CC(=CC(=C21)C3=NC=C4C(=C3F)N=C(N=C4N5CC6CCC(C5)N6)OC[C@@]78CCCN7C[C@@H](C8)F)O)F
- InChI: InChI=InChI=1S/C33H31F3N6O2/c1-2-23-26(35)7-4-18-10-22(43)11-24(27(18)23)29-28(36)30-25(13-37-29)31(41-15-20-5-6-21(16-41)38-20)40-32(39-30)44-17-33-8-3-9-42(33)14-19(34)12-33/h1,4,7,10-11,13,19-21,38,43H,3,5-6,8-9,12,14-17H2/t19-,20?,21?,33+/m1/s1; Key:SCLLZBIBSFTLIN-IFMUVJFISA-N

MRTX1133 is an investigational drug that targets the G12D mutation in KRAS dependent cancers. MRTX1133 was in a phase 1/2 clinical trial for the treatment of solid tumors, however the study was terminated in Q1 2025. MRTX1133 is considered to be harmful from direct skin or eye exposure other than transient irritation. It may cause irritation of the respiratory system if inhaled.

== See also ==
- ACBI3
- Adagrasib
- Daraxonrasib
- Olomorasib
- Zoldonrasib
- Sotorasib
