= BAY-293 =

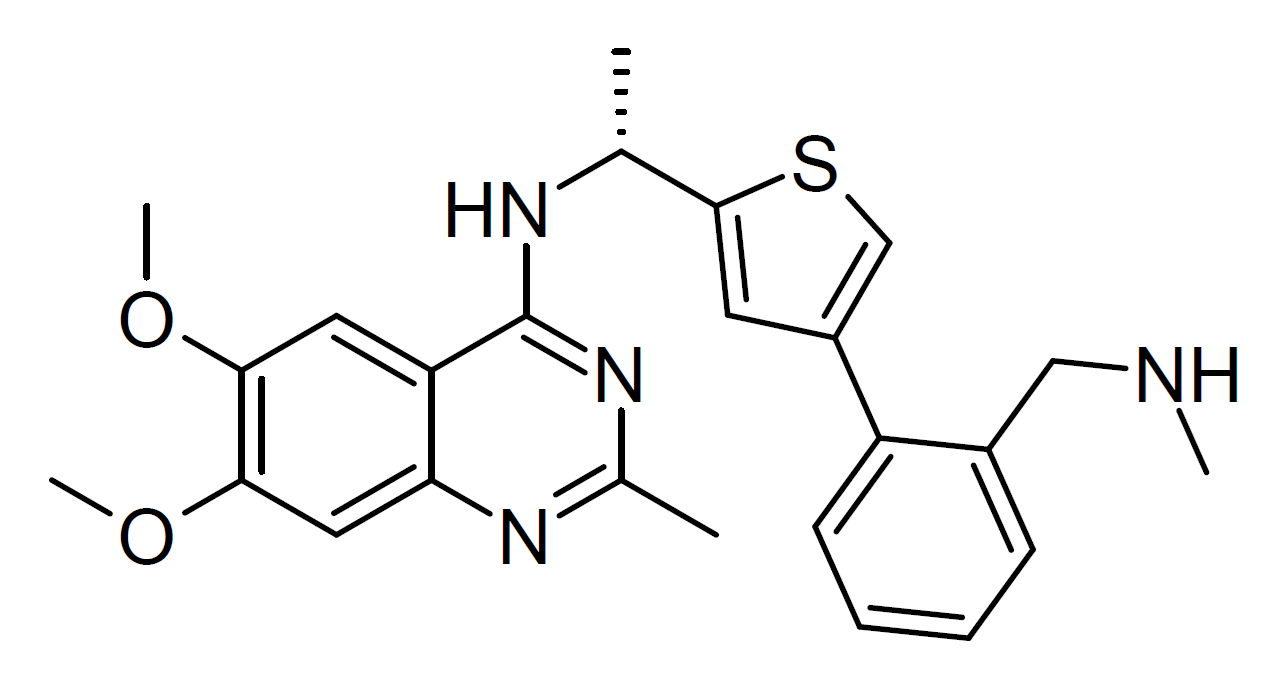

Clinical data
- Drug class: SOS1 inhibitor

Identifiers
- IUPAC name: 6,7-dimethoxy-2-methyl-N-[(1R)-1-[4-[2-(methylaminomethyl)phenyl]thiophen-2-yl]ethyl]quinazolin-4-amine
- CAS Number: 2244904-70-7
- PubChem CID: 137322663
- IUPHAR/BPS: 10480
- ChemSpider: 72380155
- ChEBI: CHEBI:232851
- ChEMBL: ChEMBL4535474
- PDB ligand: AXH (PDBe, RCSB PDB)

Chemical and physical data
- Formula: C_{25}H_{28}N_{4}O_{2}S
- Molar mass: 448.59 g·mol^{−1}
- 3D model (JSmol): Interactive image
- SMILES: CC1=NC2=CC(=C(C=C2C(=N1)N[C@H](C)C3=CC(=CS3)C4=CC=CC=C4CNC)OC)OC
- InChI: InChI=1S/C25H28N4O2S/c1-15(24-10-18(14-32-24)19-9-7-6-8-17(19)13-26-3)27-25-20-11-22(30-4)23(31-5)12-21(20)28-16(2)29-25/h6-12,14-15,26H,13H2,1-5H3,(H,27,28,29)/t15-/m1/s1; Key:WEGLOYDTDILXDA-OAHLLOKOSA-N

BAY-293 is the first drug reported to act as an inhibitor of the guanine nucleotide exchange factor protein SOS1. It acts by preventing SOS1 from binding to its target protein KRAS. It has potential applications in the treatment of cancer, and has been widely used in cancer research.

== See also ==
- BI-3406
