= Gabunamine =

Names
- IUPAC name Methyl (1S,15S,17S,18S)-17-ethyl-7-[(1R,12R,14R,15E)-15-ethylidene-18-methoxycarbonyl-10,17-diazatetracyclo[12.3.1.0^{3,11}.0^{4,9}]octadeca-3(11),4,6,8-tetraen-12-yl]-6-methoxy-3,13-diazapentacyclo[13.3.1.02,10.04,9.013,18]nonadeca-2(10),4,6,8-tetraene-1-carboxylate

Identifiers
CAS Number	66086-99-5
3D model (JSmol)	Interactive image
ChEBI	CHEBI:5238
ChemSpider	10128227
KEGG	C09193
PubChem CID	11953928
- InChI: InChI=1S/C42H50N4O5/c1-6-23-14-22-19-42(41(48)51-5)38-26(12-13-46(21-22)39(23)42)28-16-29(35(49-3)18-33(28)45-38)30-15-27-24(7-2)20-43-34(36(27)40(47)50-4)17-31-25-10-8-9-11-32(25)44-37(30)31/h7-11,16,18,22-23,27,30,34,36,39,43-45H,6,12-15,17,19-21H2,1-5H3/b24-7-/t22-,23-,27-,30+,34+,36?,39-,42+/m0/s1 Key: PIUQMWWFBLVDEE-WNZMBYOVSA-N
- SMILES: CC[C@H]1C[C@H]2C[C@@]3([C@H]1N(C2)CCC4=C3NC5=CC(=C(C=C45)[C@H]6C[C@@H]\7C([C@@H](CC8=C6NC9=CC=CC=C89)NC/C7=C/C)C(=O)OC)OC)C(=O)OC

Properties
Chemical formula	C_{42}H_{50}N_{4}O_{5}
Molar mass	690.885 g·mol^{−1}
- Except where otherwise noted, data are given for materials in their standard state (at 25 °C [77 °F], 100 kPa). Infobox references

Gabunamine is a bisindole isolate of Tabernaemontana with anticancer activity.
