= VUBI1 =

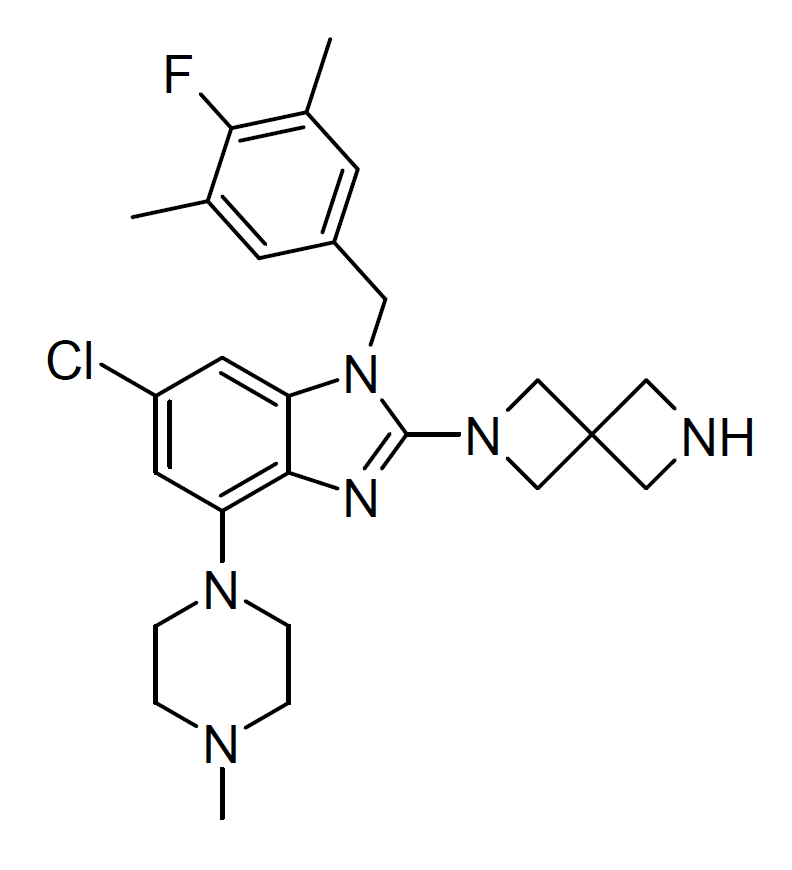

Clinical data
- Drug class: SOS1 activator

Identifiers
- IUPAC name: 6-chloro-2-(2,6-diazaspiro[3.3]heptan-2-yl)-1-[(4-fluoro-3,5-dimethylphenyl)methyl]-4-(4-methylpiperazin-1-yl)benzimidazole
- CAS Number: 2245237-53-8
- PubChem CID: 134814234

Chemical and physical data
- Formula: C_{26}H_{32}ClFN_{6}
- Molar mass: 483.03 g·mol^{−1}
- 3D model (JSmol): Interactive image
- SMILES: CC1=CC(=CC(=C1F)C)CN2C3=C(C(=CC(=C3)Cl)N4CCN(CC4)C)N=C2N5CC6(C5)CNC6
- InChI: InChI=1S/C26H32ClFN6/c1-17-8-19(9-18(2)23(17)28)12-34-22-11-20(27)10-21(32-6-4-31(3)5-7-32)24(22)30-25(34)33-15-26(16-33)13-29-14-26/h8-11,29H,4-7,12-16H2,1-3H3; Key:JWZAQUXBYYOGFA-UHFFFAOYSA-N

VUBI1 is a drug that acts as an activator of the guanine nucleotide exchange factor protein SOS1, increasing the rate at which it catalyzes the exchange of GDP for GTP on its target protein KRAS. While inhibitors of SOS1 have been more widely researched for the treatment of cancer, under some conditions increasing SOS1 activity can also have an anti-cancer effect by destructive overactivation of cellular signaling processes, so SOS1 activators are also of potential clinical interest, as well as being used for the study of the SOS1-KRAS intercellular pathway.
