= Glesatinib =

Chemical compound

Clinical data
- Routes of administration: By mouth
- ATC code: None

Legal status
- Legal status: Investigational

Identifiers
- IUPAC name: N-[(3-Fluoro-4-{[2-(5-{[(2-methoxyethyl)amino]methyl}-2-pyridinyl)thieno[3,2-b]pyridin-7-yl]oxy}phenyl)carbamothioyl]-2-(4-fluorophenyl)acetamide
- CAS Number: 936694-12-1
- PubChem CID: 25181472
- ChemSpider: 52084900
- UNII: 7Q29OXD98N
- KEGG: D11136
- CompTox Dashboard (EPA): DTXSID601337113

Chemical and physical data
- Formula: C_{31}H_{27}F_{2}N_{5}O_{3}S_{2}
- Molar mass: 619.71 g·mol^{−1}
- 3D model (JSmol): Interactive image
- SMILES: COCCNCc1ccc(nc1)c2cc3c(s2)c(ccn3)Oc4ccc(cc4F)NC(=S)NC(=O)Cc5ccc(cc5)F
- InChI: InChI=1S/C31H27F2N5O3S2/c1-40-13-12-34-17-20-4-8-24(36-18-20)28-16-25-30(43-28)27(10-11-35-25)41-26-9-7-22(15-23(26)33)37-31(42)38-29(39)14-19-2-5-21(32)6-3-19/h2-11,15-16,18,34H,12-14,17H2,1H3,(H2,37,38,39,42); Key:YRCHYHRCBXNYNU-UHFFFAOYSA-N

Glesatinib (MGCD265) is an experimental anti-cancer drug.

It is in phase 2 clinical trials for non-small cell lung cancer (NSCLC).

It is a spectrum selective tyrosine kinase inhibitor "for the treatment of non-small cell lung cancer (NSCLC) patients with genetic alterations of MET".

== See also ==
- Mirati Therapeutics
