= Garsorasib =

Clinical data
- Trade names: 安方宁
- Other names: D-1553

Legal status
- Legal status: Rx in China

Identifiers
- IUPAC name: 7-(2-Amino-6-fluorophenyl)-1-(4,6-dicyclopropylpyrimidin-5-yl)-4-[(2S,5R)-2,5-dimethyl-4-prop-2-enoylpiperazin-1-yl]-6-fluoropyrido[2,3-d]pyrimidin-2-one
- CAS Number: 2559761-14-5
- PubChem CID: 155332312
- ChemSpider: 115010420
- UNII: P491NE9G6Z
- ChEMBL: ChEMBL5095066

Chemical and physical data
- Formula: C_{32}H_{32}F_{2}N_{8}O_{2}
- Molar mass: 598.659 g·mol^{−1}
- 3D model (JSmol): Interactive image
- SMILES: C[C@@H]1CN([C@H](CN1C(=O)C=C)C)C2=NC(=O)N(C3=NC(=C(C=C32)F)C4=C(C=CC=C4F)N)C5=C(N=CN=C5C6CC6)C7CC7
- InChI: InChI=1S/C32H32F2N8O2/c1-4-24(43)40-13-17(3)41(14-16(40)2)30-20-12-22(34)28(25-21(33)6-5-7-23(25)35)38-31(20)42(32(44)39-30)29-26(18-8-9-18)36-15-37-27(29)19-10-11-19/h4-7,12,15-19H,1,8-11,13-14,35H2,2-3H3/t16-,17+/m1/s1; Key:DKFRWZJCNPETGI-SJORKVTESA-N

Garsorasib is a pharmaceutical drug used for cancer treatment. It is a selective inhibitor of the enzyme KRAS that has the G12C mutation.

In China, it is approved for the treatment of advanced non-small cell lung cancer (NSCLC) carrying the KRAS G12C mutation in patients who have received at least one systemic treatment.
