= BI-3406 =

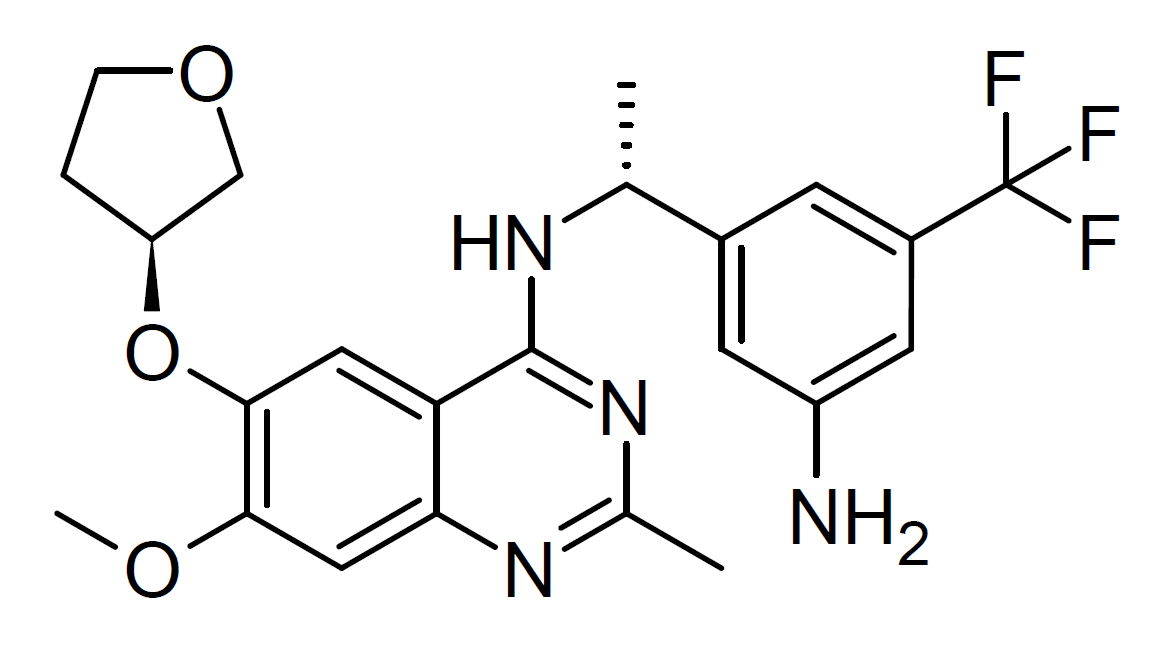

Clinical data
- Drug class: SOS1 inhibitor

Identifiers
- IUPAC name: N-[(1R)-1-[3-amino-5-(trifluoromethyl)phenyl]ethyl]-7-methoxy-2-methyl-6-[(3S)-oxolan-3-yl]oxyquinazolin-4-amine
- CAS Number: 2230836-55-0
- PubChem CID: 138911318
- ChemSpider: 78317621
- UNII: P49LSH4TMF
- ChEMBL: ChEMBL4519023
- PDB ligand: L7H (PDBe, RCSB PDB)

Chemical and physical data
- Formula: C_{23}H_{25}F_{3}N_{4}O_{3}
- Molar mass: 462.473 g·mol^{−1}
- 3D model (JSmol): Interactive image
- SMILES: CC1=NC2=CC(=C(C=C2C(=N1)N[C@H](C)C3=CC(=CC(=C3)N)C(F)(F)F)O[C@H]4CCOC4)OC
- InChI: InChI=1S/C23H25F3N4O3/c1-12(14-6-15(23(24,25)26)8-16(27)7-14)28-22-18-9-21(33-17-4-5-32-11-17)20(31-3)10-19(18)29-13(2)30-22/h6-10,12,17H,4-5,11,27H2,1-3H3,(H,28,29,30)/t12-,17+/m1/s1; Key:XVFDNRYZXDHTHT-PXAZEXFGSA-N

BI-3406 is a drug that acts as an inhibitor of the guanine nucleotide exchange factor protein SOS1, and prevents it from binding to its target protein KRAS. It has potential applications in the treatment of cancer, and has been widely used in cancer research either in combination with other drugs or as a lead compound for the development of related compounds.

== See also ==
- BAY-293
