= RASSF2 =

Protein-coding gene in the species Homo sapiens

Identifiers
- Aliases: RASSF2, CENP-34, RASFADIN, Ras association domain family member 2
- External IDs: OMIM: 609492; MGI: 2442060; GeneCards: RASSF2

Gene location (Human)
Chr.	Chromosome 20 (human)
Band	20p13	Start	4,780,023 bp
Band	20p13	End	4,823,608 bp

Gene location (Mouse)
Chr.	Chromosome 2 (mouse)
Band	2|2 F2	Start	131,831,335 bp
Band	2|2 F2	End	131,872,178 bp
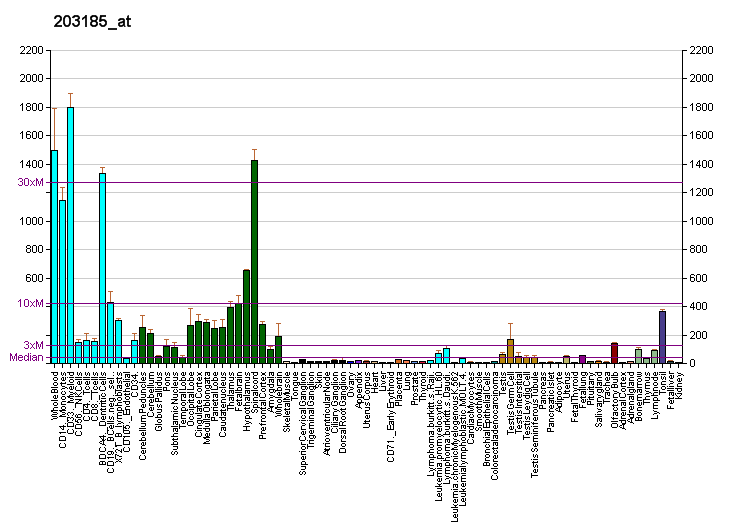
RNA expression pattern
Bgee	Human / Mouse (ortholog); Top expressed in: inferior ganglion of vagus nerve; subthalamic nucleus; C1 segment; external globus pallidus; medulla oblongata; corpus callosum; pars reticulata; superior vestibular nucleus; internal globus pallidus; middle frontal gyrus / Top expressed in: meninges; granulocyte; thymus; stroma of bone marrow; mesenteric lymph nodes; lumbar subsegment of spinal cord; spleen; blood; optic nerve; uterus; More reference expression data
BioGPS	More reference expression data
Gene ontology
Molecular function	protein binding; protein kinase activity
Cellular component	cytoplasm; nucleus; chromosome, centromeric region; kinetochore; chromosome; nucleoplasm; Golgi apparatus; cytosol; plasma membrane; protein-containing complex
Biological process	positive regulation of JNK cascade; positive regulation of protein autophosphorylation; skeletal system development; regulation of osteoclast differentiation; negative regulation of peptidyl-serine phosphorylation; regulation of osteoblast differentiation; regulation of NIK/NF-kappaB signaling; homeostasis of number of cells; bone remodeling; ossification; negative regulation of NIK/NF-kappaB signaling; epidermal growth factor receptor signaling pathway via I-kappaB kinase/NF-kappaB cascade; positive regulation of apoptotic process; signal transduction; positive regulation of protein kinase activity; protein stabilization; cell cycle; protein phosphorylation; regulation of apoptotic process
Sources:Amigo / QuickGO
Orthologs
Databases	NCBI: entry; OMA: entry
Species	Human	Mouse
Entrez	9770	215653
Ensembl	ENSG00000101265	ENSMUSG00000027339
UniProt	P50749	Q8BMS9
RefSeq (mRNA)	NM_014737; NM_170774; NM_170773	NM_175445; NM_001362866
RefSeq (protein)	NP_055552; NP_739580	NP_780654; NP_001349795
Location (UCSC)	Chr 20: 4.78 – 4.82 Mb	Chr 2: 131.83 – 131.87 Mb
PubMed search
- Wikidata
View/Edit Human	View/Edit Mouse

Ras association domain-containing protein 2 is a protein that in humans is encoded by the RASSF2 gene.

This gene encodes a protein that contains a Ras association domain. Similar to its cattle and sheep counterparts, this gene is located near the prion gene. Two alternatively spliced transcripts encoding the same isoform have been reported.

== Interactions ==
RASSF2 has been shown to interact with KRAS.
