= Sitravatinib =

Chemical compound

Clinical data
- ATC code: L01EX26 (WHO)

Identifiers
- IUPAC name: N-(3-Fluoro-4-{[2-(5-{[(2-methoxyethyl)amino]methyl}-2-pyridinyl)thieno[3,2-b]pyridin-7-yl]oxy}phenyl)-N′-(4-fluorophenyl)-1,1-cyclopropanedicarboxamide
- CAS Number: 1123837-84-2
- ChemSpider: 52083477
- UNII: CWG62Q1VTB
- KEGG: D11140
- CompTox Dashboard (EPA): DTXSID801100124

Chemical and physical data
- Formula: C_{33}H_{29}F_{2}N_{5}O_{4}S
- Molar mass: 629.68 g·mol^{−1}
- 3D model (JSmol): Interactive image
- SMILES: COCCNCc1ccc(nc1)c2cc3c(s2)c(ccn3)Oc4ccc(cc4F)NC(=O)C5(CC5)C(=O)Nc6ccc(cc6)F
- InChI: InChI=1S/C33H29F2N5O4S/c1-43-15-14-36-18-20-2-8-25(38-19-20)29-17-26-30(45-29)28(10-13-37-26)44-27-9-7-23(16-24(27)35)40-32(42)33(11-12-33)31(41)39-22-5-3-21(34)4-6-22/h2-10,13,16-17,19,36H,11-12,14-15,18H2,1H3,(H,39,41)(H,40,42); Key:WLAVZAAODLTUSW-UHFFFAOYSA-N

Sitravatinib (MGCD516) is an experimental drug for the treatment of cancer. It is a small molecule inhibitor of multiple tyrosine kinases.

Sitravatinib is being developed by Mirati Therapeutics.

Ongoing phase II trials include a trial for liposarcoma, a combination trial for non-small cell lung cancer, and a combination trial with nivolumab for renal cell carcinoma. Sitravatinib is being evaluated in ongoing trials in patients with advanced non-small cell lung cancer, including in a combination trial with nivolumab in those who are resistant to checkpoint inhibitor therapy, and certain patients who are naïve to checkpoint inhibitor therapy.
