= Calderasib =

Investigational drug

Clinical data
- Other names: MK-1084

Identifiers
- IUPAC name: (5P,17aM)-20-chloro-2-[(2S,5R)-2,5-dimethyl-4-(prop-2-enoyl)piperazin-1-yl]-14,17-difluoro-6-(propan-2-yl)-11,12-dihydro-4H-1,18-ethenopyrido[4,3-e]pyrimido[1,6-g][1,4,7,9]benzodioxadiazacyclododecin-4-one
- PubChem CID: 156295589
- UNII: YQF4ART47C
- ChEMBL: ChEMBL4875422

Chemical and physical data
- Formula: C_{32}H_{31}ClF_{2}N_{6}O_{4}
- Molar mass: 637.08 g·mol^{−1}
- 3D model (JSmol): Interactive image
- SMILES: C[C@@H]1CN([C@H](CN1C(=O)C=C)C)C2=NC(=O)N3C4=C(C=CN=C4C(C)C)OCCOC5=C(C=CC(=C5C6=C(C=C2C3=N6)Cl)F)F
- InChI: InChI=InChI=1S/C32H31ClF2N6O4/c1-6-24(42)39-14-18(5)40(15-17(39)4)30-19-13-20(33)27-25-21(34)7-8-22(35)29(25)45-12-11-44-23-9-10-36-26(16(2)3)28(23)41(31(19)37-27)32(43)38-30/h6-10,13,16-18H,1,11-12,14-15H2,2-5H3/t17-,18+/m1/s1; Key:BBIVCWWQPMOKAC-MSOLQXFVSA-N

Calderasib is an investigational new drug that is being developed by Merck Sharp & Dohme for the treatment of solid tumors. It targets tumors that express G12C mutated KRAS protein.

It has been awarded a breakthrough therapy designation by the U.S. Food and Drug Administration.
