= Werner H. Kirsten =

Werner H. Kirsten

Werner H. Kirsten (October 29, 1925 in Leipzig — December 24, 1992 in Hyde Park, Chicago) was a German-American pathologist and cancer researcher, known as the discoverer and namesake of a cancer-causing virus, the Kirsten Rat Sarcoma Virus, (Note: also known as Kirsten Mouse Sarcoma Virus and Kirsten Murine Sarcoma Virus) and consequently of the KRAS oncogene.

== Early life and education ==
Werner H. Kirsten was born in Leipzig in 1925.

He attended the Universität Frankfurt am Main, graduating summa cum laude with an MD in 1953. He subsequently worked at the Senckenberg Institute of Pathology and the Paul Ehrlich Institute in Frankfurt.

== Career ==
In 1955, Kirsten moved to Chicago to pursue an internship and a residency. In 1956, he joined the Pathology Department at the University of Chicago. In 1960, he was granted American citizenship. He became an assistant professor in 1961, and — in the wake of his 1967 discovery of the sarcomavirus — a full professor in 1968. In 1972, he was promoted to head of the department of pathology.

In 1986, he left the university and joined the National Cancer Institute as associate director of their facility in Frederick, Maryland. In 1988, he was promoted to director, a position he retained until his death.

== Personal life and death ==
Kirsten was married to Inger Nielsen, with whom he had three sons, Christian, Olaf and Thomas. He died age 67 on December 24, 1992, in Hyde Park, Chicago.

== Legacy ==
The Werner H. Kirsten Student Internship Program is a one-year internship for high school seniors in which they can immerse themselves into research and administrative management in a health care environment.
