= Elisrasib =

Investigational drug

Clinical data
- Other names: D3S-001

Identifiers
- IUPAC name: [(2S)-4-[(7S)-7-[3-amino-2-fluoro-5-methyl-6-(trifluoromethyl)phenyl]-2-{[(2R,7aS)-2-fluorotetrahydro-1H-pyrrolizin-7a(5H)-yl]methoxy}-7,8-dihydro-5H-pyrano[4,3-d]pyrimidin-4-yl]-1-(2-fluoroprop-2-enoyl)piperazin-2-yl]acetonitrile
- PubChem CID: 167251905
- UNII: PFW9YLB86H
- KEGG: D13352
- ChEMBL: ChEMBL5314913

Chemical and physical data
- Formula: C_{32}H_{35}F_{6}N_{7}O_{3}
- Molar mass: 679.668 g·mol^{−1}
- 3D model (JSmol): Interactive image
- SMILES: CC1=CC(=C(C(=C1C(F)(F)F)[C@@H]2CC3=C(CO2)C(=NC(=N3)OC[C@@]45CCCN4C[C@@H](C5)F)N6CCN([C@H](C6)CC#N)C(=O)C(=C)F)F)N
- InChI: InChI=InChI=1S/C32H35F6N7O3/c1-17-10-22(40)27(35)25(26(17)32(36,37)38)24-11-23-21(15-47-24)28(43-8-9-45(29(46)18(2)33)20(14-43)4-6-39)42-30(41-23)48-16-31-5-3-7-44(31)13-19(34)12-31/h10,19-20,24H,2-5,7-9,11-16,40H2,1H3/t19-,20+,24+,31+/m1/s1; Key:JOLORSRKBHXPFT-PNGHJTAWSA-N

Elisrasib is an investigational new drug that is being developed by D3 Bio for the treatment of solid tumors. It is a G12C mutant selective KRAS inhibitor.
