= Setidegrasib =

Clinical data
- Other names: ASP-3082

Identifiers
- IUPAC name: (2S,4R)-1-[(2S)-2-[4-[4-[[6-cyclopropyl-4-[(1S,4S)-2,5-diazabicyclo[2.2.1]heptan-2-yl]-7-(6-fluoro-5-methyl-1H-indazol-4-yl)-2-(oxan-4-yloxy)quinazolin-8-yl]oxymethyl]phenyl]triazol-1-yl]-3-methylbutanoyl]-4-hydroxy-N-[(1R)-2-hydroxy-1-[4-(4-methyl-1,3-thiazol-5-yl)phenyl]ethyl]pyrrolidine-2-carboxamide
- CAS Number: 2821793-99-9
- PubChem CID: 164875418
- DrugBank: DB21670
- ChemSpider: 128942434
- UNII: 3NQ4ME292X
- ChEBI: CHEBI:760090
- ChEMBL: ChEMBL6068173
- PDB ligand: A1L66 (PDBe, RCSB PDB)

Chemical and physical data
- Formula: C_{60}H_{65}FN_{12}O_{7}S
- Molar mass: 1117.32 g·mol^{−1}
- 3D model (JSmol): Interactive image
- SMILES: CC1=C(C=C2C(=C1C3=C(C=C4C(=C3OCC5=CC=C(C=C5)C6=CN(N=N6)[C@@H](C(C)C)C(=O)N7C[C@@H](C[C@H]7C(=O)N[C@@H](CO)C8=CC=C(C=C8)C9=C(N=CS9)C)O)N=C(N=C4N1C[C@@H]3C[C@H]1CN3)OC1CCOCC1)C1CC1)C=NN2)F
- InChI: InChI=InChI=1S/C60H65FN12O7S/c1-31(2)54(59(77)72-26-41(75)20-50(72)58(76)65-49(28-74)37-11-13-38(14-12-37)56-33(4)63-30-81-56)73-27-48(69-70-73)36-7-5-34(6-8-36)29-79-55-52(51-32(3)46(61)22-47-45(51)24-64-68-47)43(35-9-10-35)21-44-53(55)66-60(80-42-15-17-78-18-16-42)67-57(44)71-25-39-19-40(71)23-62-39/h5-8,11-14,21-22,24,27,30-31,35,39-42,49-50,54,62,74-75H,9-10,15-20,23,25-26,28-29H2,1-4H3,(H,64,68)(H,65,76)/t39-,40-,41+,49-,50-,54-/m0/s1; Key:XXWMEQMGQNHRAF-WFJRNIGCSA-N

Setidegrasib is an investigational new drug that is being evaluated by Astellas Pharma for the treatment of solid tumors. It is an PROTACs degrader of the KRAS protein harboring a G12D mutation.

== Clinical trials ==
Setidegrasib in combination with either FOLFIRINOX or NALIRIFOX chemotherapy is currently in phase 3 clinical trials for the treatment of pancreatic cancer.
