= Elironrasib =

Investigational drug

Clinical data
- Other names: RMC-6291

Identifiers
- IUPAC name: 1-[4-(dimethylamino)-4-methylpent-2-ynoyl]-N-[(2S)-1-[[(6S,8S,14S)-22-ethyl-21-[2-[(1S)-1-methoxyethyl]-3-pyridinyl]-18,18-dimethyl-9,15-dioxo-5,16-dioxa-2,10,22,28-tetrazapentacyclo[18.5.2.12,6.110,14.023,27]nonacosa-1(26),20,23(27),24-tetraen-8-yl]amino]-3-methyl-1-oxobutan-2-yl]-4-fluoro-N-methylpiperidine-4-carboxamide
- CAS Number: 2641998-63-0
- PubChem CID: 156336120
- UNII: 942KVV5CJP
- ChEMBL: ChEMBL5437500

Chemical and physical data
- Formula: C_{55}H_{78}FN_{9}O_{8}
- Molar mass: 1012.282 g·mol^{−1}
- 3D model (JSmol): Interactive image
- SMILES: CCN1C2=C3C=C(C=C2)N4CCO[C@H](C4)C[C@@H](C(=O)N5CCC[C@H](N5)C(=O)OCC(CC3=C1C6=C(N=CC=C6)[C@H](C)OC)(C)C)NC(=O)[C@H](C(C)C)N(C)C(=O)C7(CCN(CC7)C(=O)C#CC(C)(C)N(C)C)F
- InChI: InChI=InChI=1S/C55H78FN9O8/c1-13-64-44-19-18-37-30-40(44)41(48(64)39-16-14-24-57-46(39)36(4)71-12)32-53(5,6)34-73-51(69)42-17-15-25-65(59-42)50(68)43(31-38-33-63(37)28-29-72-38)58-49(67)47(35(2)3)61(11)52(70)55(56)22-26-62(27-23-55)45(66)20-21-54(7,8)60(9)10/h14,16,18-19,24,30,35-36,38,42-43,47,59H,13,15,17,22-23,25-29,31-34H2,1-12H3,(H,58,67)/t36-,38-,42-,43-,47-/m0/s1; Key:HJNFYLSFWYRSHS-CMZSUCOPSA-N

Elironrasib is an investigational new drug that is being developed by REVOLUTION Medicines for the treatment of solid tumors. It is a RAS(ON) G12C-Selective KRAS inhibitor.
