= Fulzerasib =

Clinical data
- Other names: Dupert; GFH-925; IBI-351

Legal status
- Legal status: CN: ℞-only

Identifiers
- IUPAC name: (7R)-16-chloro-15-(2-fluoro-6-hydroxyphenyl)-7,9-dimethyl-12-(4-methyl-2-propan-2-yl-3-pyridinyl)-5-prop-2-enoyl-2,5,9,12,14-pentazatetracyclo[8.8.0.02,7.013,18]octadeca-1(10),13,15,17-tetraene-8,11-dione
- CAS Number: 2641747-54-6
- PubChem CID: 167713279
- IUPHAR/BPS: 12393
- DrugBank: DB21609
- ChemSpider: 129307087
- UNII: 6D5B7F245W
- ChEBI: CHEBI:759169
- ChEMBL: ChEMBL5314463

Chemical and physical data
- Formula: C_{33}H_{32}ClFN_{6}O_{4}
- Molar mass: 631.11 g·mol^{−1}
- 3D model (JSmol): Interactive image
- SMILES: CC1=C(C(=NC=C1)C(C)C)N2C3=NC(=C(C=C3C4=C(C2=O)N(C(=O)[C@@]5(N4CCN(C5)C(=O)C=C)C)C)Cl)C6=C(C=CC=C6F)O
- InChI: InChI=InChI=1S/C33H32ClFN6O4/c1-7-23(43)39-13-14-40-28-19-15-20(34)26(24-21(35)9-8-10-22(24)42)37-30(19)41(27-18(4)11-12-36-25(27)17(2)3)31(44)29(28)38(6)32(45)33(40,5)16-39/h7-12,15,17,42H,1,13-14,16H2,2-6H3/t33-/m1/s1; Key:BRWVQEWFJJFLIQ-MGBGTMOVSA-N

Fulzerasib is a drug that is approved in China to treat KRAS G12C-positive non-small cell lung cancer (NSCLC).

Prior to marketing approval, fulzerasib had received two breakthrough therapy designations, the first for advanced G12C-mutant NSCLC and a second, for colorectal cancer (CRC) from the Center for Drug Evaluation (CDE) of the Chinese National Medical Products Administration (NMPA).
