= Mirati Therapeutics =

American biotechnology company

Mirati Therapeutics, Inc.
- Type: Subsidiary
- Traded as: Nasdaq: MRTX
- Industry: Oncology
- Founded: 1995; 31 years ago
- Headquarters: San Diego, California, U.S.
- Key people: David Meek
- Number of employees: 600 (2022)
- Parent: Bristol Myers Squibb
- Website: mirati.com

Mirati Therapeutics, Inc. was an American targeted oncology company that focuses on the development of cancer therapeutics. Bristol Myers Squibb acquired the company in January 2024.

== History ==
Mirati Therapeutics worked largely in KRAS-mutation inhibition, and developing treatments for tumors that contain it. The inhibition to the mutation has shown to shrink the size of its tumors. The company was based in San Diego, California. The company’s name came from the Italian word for “targeted” (Mirati). Mirati Therapeutics was traded on the Nasdaq under the ticker symbol MRTX. It joined the exchange in 2013.

In October 2023, Bristol Myers Squibb agreed to acquire the company in an all-cash deal worth $4.8 billion, and an additional $1 billion in milestone payment. The acquisition was completed in January 2024.

== Drug candidates ==
The company’s leading drug candidates are sitravatinib and adagrasib. Mirati also has a preclinical candidate against the G12D mutation.

== Management ==
The company’s CEO and President was David Meek.
