= SOS1 =

Protein-coding gene in the species Homo sapiens

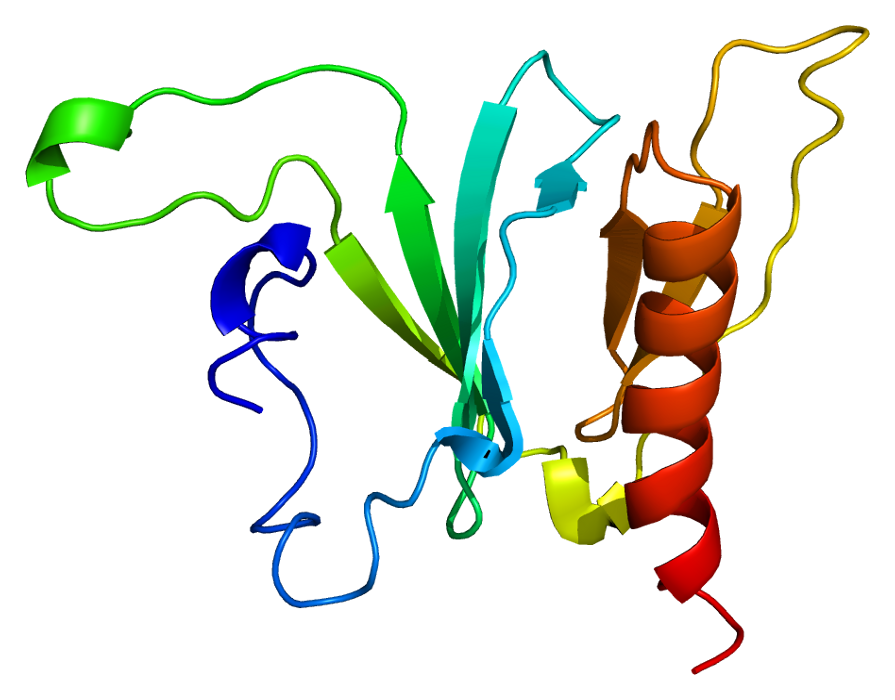

Identifiers
- Aliases: SOS1, GF1, GGF1, GINGF, HGF, NS4, SOS Ras/Rac guanine nucleotide exchange factor 1, SOS-1
- External IDs: OMIM: 182530; MGI: 98354; GeneCards: SOS1
Available structures
PDB	Ortholog search: PDBe RCSB
PDB	List of PDB id codes 1AWE, 1BKD, 1DBH, 1NVU, 1NVV, 1NVW, 1NVX, 1Q9C, 1XD2, 1XD4, 1XDV, 3KSY, 4NYI, 4NYJ, 4NYM, 4URU, 4URV, 4URW, 4URX, 4URY, 4URZ, 4US0, 4US1, 4US2, 2II0

Gene location (Human)
Chr.	Chromosome 2 (human)
Band	2p22.1	Start	38,962,206 bp
Band	2p22.1	End	39,124,345 bp

Gene location (Mouse)
Chr.	Chromosome 17 (mouse)
Band	17 E3|17 50.67 cM	Start	80,701,180 bp
Band	17 E3|17 50.67 cM	End	80,787,882 bp
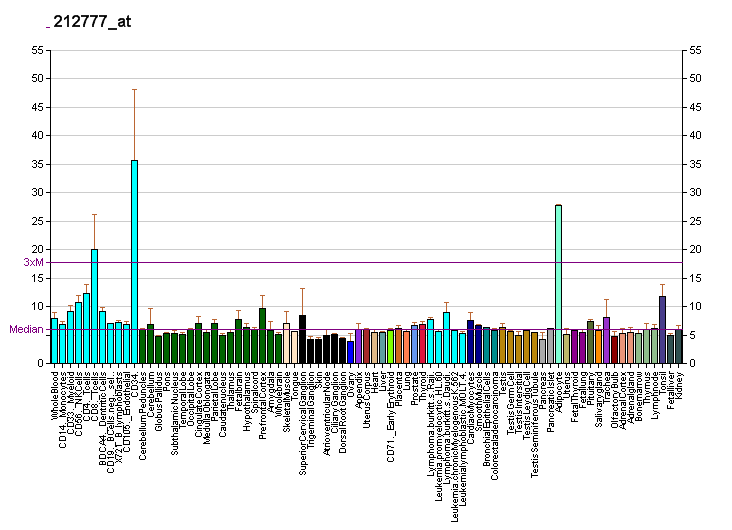

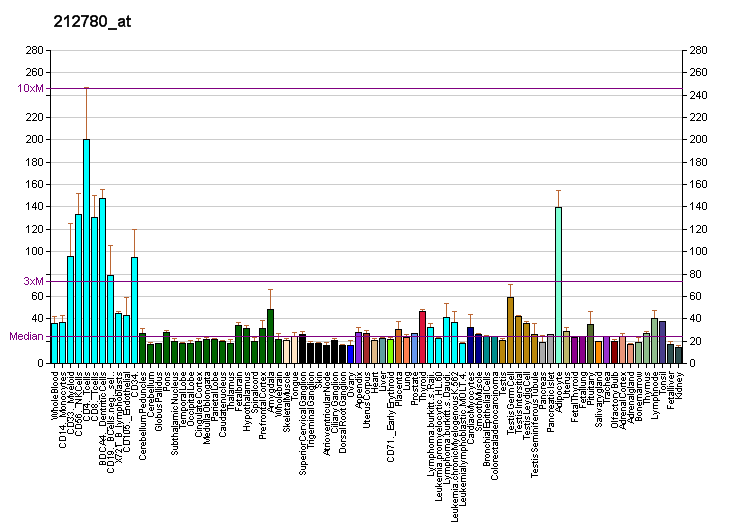
RNA expression pattern
Bgee	Human / Mouse (ortholog); Top expressed in: epithelium of colon; jejunal mucosa; tendon of biceps brachii; trigeminal ganglion; spinal ganglia; Achilles tendon; seminal vesicula; corpus callosum; subcutaneous adipose tissue; pylorus / Top expressed in: dorsomedial hypothalamic nucleus; arcuate nucleus; ventromedial nucleus; paraventricular nucleus of hypothalamus; facial motor nucleus; lateral hypothalamus; anterior horn of spinal cord; ventral tegmental area; mammillary body; median eminence; More reference expression data
BioGPS	More reference expression data
Gene ontology
Molecular function	DNA binding; GTPase activator activity; protein binding; protein heterodimerization activity; guanyl-nucleotide exchange factor activity; SH3 domain binding
Cellular component	cytosol; postsynaptic density; plasma membrane; soma; cytoplasm; nucleosome
Biological process	regulation of pro-B cell differentiation; hair follicle development; insulin receptor signaling pathway; roof of mouth development; heart trabecula morphogenesis; regulation of T cell proliferation; positive regulation of small GTPase mediated signal transduction; blood vessel morphogenesis; epidermal growth factor receptor signaling pathway; vitellogenesis; multicellular organism growth; lymphocyte homeostasis; heart morphogenesis; B cell homeostasis; eyelid development in camera-type eye; MAPK cascade; axon guidance; Fc-epsilon receptor signaling pathway; regulation of T cell differentiation in thymus; pericardium morphogenesis; positive regulation of apoptotic process; midbrain morphogenesis; cardiac atrium morphogenesis; Ras protein signal transduction; regulation of Rho protein signal transduction; regulation of small GTPase mediated signal transduction; positive regulation of epidermal growth factor receptor signaling pathway; leukocyte migration; signal transduction; positive regulation of GTPase activity; small GTPase mediated signal transduction; ERBB2 signaling pathway; G protein-coupled receptor signaling pathway; cytokine-mediated signaling pathway; neurotrophin TRK receptor signaling pathway
Sources:Amigo / QuickGO
Orthologs
Databases	NCBI: entry; OMA: entry
Species	Human	Mouse
Entrez	6654	20662
Ensembl	ENSG00000115904	ENSMUSG00000024241
UniProt	Q07889	Q62245
RefSeq (mRNA)	NM_005633; NM_001382394; NM_001382395	NM_009231
RefSeq (protein)	NP_005624; NP_001369323; NP_001369324	NP_033257
Location (UCSC)	Chr 2: 38.96 – 39.12 Mb	Chr 17: 80.7 – 80.79 Mb
PubMed search
- Wikidata
View/Edit Human	View/Edit Mouse

Son of sevenless homolog 1 is a protein that in humans is encoded by the SOS1 gene.

== Function ==
SOS1 is a guanine nucleotide exchange factor (GEF) which interacts with Ras proteins to phosphorylate GDP into GTP, or from an inactive state to an active state to signal cell proliferation. RAS genes (e.g., MIM 190020) encode membrane-bound guanine nucleotide-binding proteins that function in the transduction of signals that control cell growth and differentiation. Binding of GTP activates RAS proteins, and subsequent hydrolysis of the bound GTP to GDP and phosphate inactivates signaling by these proteins. GTP binding can be catalyzed by guanine nucleotide exchange factors for RAS, and GTP hydrolysis can be accelerated by GTPase-activating proteins (GAPs). The first exchange factor to be identified for RAS was the S. cerevisiae Cdc25 gene product (not to be confused with the S. pombe Cdc25). Genetic analysis indicated that CDC25 is essential for activation of RAS proteins. In Drosophila, the protein encoded by the 'son of sevenless' gene (Sos) contains a domain that shows sequence similarity with the catalytic domain of Cdc25. Sos may act as a positive regulator of RAS by promoting guanine nucleotide exchange.

== Clinical significance ==
Recent studies also show that mutations in Sos1 can cause Noonan syndrome and hereditary gingival fibromatosis type 1. Noonan syndrome has also been shown to be caused by mutations in KRAS and PTPN11 genes. activators of the MAP kinase pathway.

== Inhibitors and activators ==
Inhibitors

- BAY-293, the first SOS1 inhibitor, was reported in 2019, and met the quality criteria for a 'Donated Chemical Probe' as defined by the Structural Genomics Consortium.
- BI-3406 was reported soon afterwards in 2021.

Activators

- VUBI1, was reported by Fesik et al. in 2018 along with other benzimidazole-derived SOS1 activators.

PROTACs

- SIAIS562055

== Interactions ==
SOS1 has been shown to interact with:

- ABI1,
- BCR gene,
- CRK,
- EPS8,
- Epidermal growth factor receptor,
- FRS2,
- Grb2,
- HRAS,
- ITSN1,
- MUC1,
- NCK1,
- PLCG1,
- PTPN11,
- SH3KBP1, and
- SHC1. and

== See also ==
- Son of Sevenless
