= K-Ras(G12C) inhibitor 6 =

Names
- Preferred IUPAC name N-{1-[(2,4-Dichlorophenoxy)acetyl]piperidin-4-yl}-4-sulfanylbutanamide

Identifiers
CAS Number	2060530-16-5
3D model (JSmol)	Interactive image
ChemSpider	31042597
PubChem CID	71815954
UNII	JPV55C3PN4
- InChI: InChI=1S/C17H22Cl2N2O3S/c18-12-3-4-15(14(19)10-12)24-11-17(23)21-7-5-13(6-8-21)20-16(22)2-1-9-25/h3-4,10,13,25H,1-2,5-9,11H2,(H,20,22) Key: ZPXCEHMKUTXHRZ-UHFFFAOYSA-N
- SMILES: SCCCC(=O)NC1CCN(CC1)C(=O)COC1=CC=C(Cl)C=C1Cl

Properties
Chemical formula	C_{17}H_{22}Cl_{2}N_{2}O_{3}S
Molar mass	405.33 g·mol^{−1}
- Except where otherwise noted, data are given for materials in their standard state (at 25 °C [77 °F], 100 kPa). Infobox references

K-Ras(G12C) inhibitor 6 is an inhibitor of the oncogene KRAS.

Its family of inhibitors allosterically control the GTP affinity of mutant K-Ras which is a driver in many cancers.

In recent years, significant research efforts have focused on finding effective inhibitors for the Kras-G12C mutation leading to the FDA-approval of G12C-KRAS targeting therapies including sotorasib (Lumakras) and Adagrasib (MRTX849)

K-Ras(G12C) inhibitor 6 is an irreversible inhibitor subverting the native nucleotide preference to favour GDP over GTP.
