= Anticarcinogen =

Class of pharmaceutical compounds

An anticarcinogen (also known as a carcinopreventive agent) is a substance that counteracts the effects of a carcinogen or inhibits the development of cancer. Anticarcinogens are different from anticarcinoma agents (also known as anticancer or anti-neoplastic agents) in that anticarcinoma agents are used to selectively destroy or inhibit cancer cells after cancer has developed. Interest in anticarcinogens is motivated primarily by the principle that it is preferable to prevent disease (preventive medicine) than to have to treat it (rescue medicine).

In theory, anticarcinogens may act via different mechanisms including enhancement of natural defences against cancer, deactivation of carcinogens, and blocking the mechanisms by which carcinogens act (such as free radical damage to DNA). Confirmation that a substance possesses anticarcinogenic activity requires extensive in vitro, in vivo, and clinical investigation. Health claims for anticarcinogens are regulated by various national and international organizations like the US Food and Drug Administration (FDA) and European Food Safety Authority (EFSA).

== See also ==
- Mutagen
- Carcinogenesis
