= Adagrasib =

Medication

Clinical data
- Trade names: Krazati
- Other names: MRTX-849
- AHFS/Drugs.com: Monograph
- MedlinePlus: a623003
- License data: US DailyMed: Adagrasib
- Routes of administration: By mouth
- Drug class: Antineoplastic agent
- ATC code: L01XX77 (WHO)

Legal status
- Legal status: US: ℞-only; EU: Rx-only

Identifiers
- IUPAC name: {(2S)-4-[7-(8-chloronaphthalen-1-yl)-2-{[(2S)-1methylpyrrolidin-2-yl]methoxy}-5,6,7,8tetrahydropyrido[3,4-d]pyrimidin-4-yl]-1-(2-fluoroprop2-enoyl)piperazin-2-yl}acetonitrile
- CAS Number: 2326521-71-3
- PubChem CID: 138611145
- DrugBank: DB15568
- UNII: 8EOO6HQF8Y
- KEGG: D12301
- CompTox Dashboard (EPA): DTXSID801336759
- ECHA InfoCard: 100.329.928

Chemical and physical data
- Formula: C_{32}H_{35}ClFN_{7}O_{2}
- Molar mass: 604.13 g·mol^{−1}
- 3D model (JSmol): Interactive image
- SMILES: CN1CCC[C@H]1COC2=NC3=C(CCN(C3)C4=CC=CC5=C4C(=CC=C5)Cl)C(=N2)N6CCN([C@H](C6)CC#N)C(=O)C(=C)F
- InChI: InChI=1S/C32H35ClFN7O2/c1-21(34)31(42)41-17-16-40(18-23(41)11-13-35)30-25-12-15-39(28-10-4-7-22-6-3-9-26(33)29(22)28)19-27(25)36-32(37-30)43-20-24-8-5-14-38(24)2/h3-4,6-7,9-10,23-24H,1,5,8,11-12,14-20H2,2H3/t23-,24-/m0/s1; Key:PEMUGDMSUDYLHU-ZEQRLZLVSA-N

Adagrasib, sold under the brand name Krazati, is an anticancer medication used to treat non-small cell lung cancer. Adagrasib is an inhibitor of G12C mutated KRAS GTPase. It is taken by mouth. It is being developed by Mirati Therapeutics, which is now a subsidiary of Bristol Myers Squibb.

The most common adverse reactions include diarrhea, nausea, fatigue, vomiting, musculoskeletal pain, hepatotoxicity, renal impairment, dyspnea, edema, decreased appetite, cough, pneumonia, dizziness, constipation, abdominal pain, and QTc interval prolongation. The most common laboratory abnormalities include decreased lymphocytes, increased aspartate aminotransferase, decreased sodium, decreased hemoglobin, increased creatinine, decreased albumin, increased alanine aminotransferase, increased lipase, decreased platelets, decreased magnesium, and decreased potassium.

It was approved for medical use in the United States in December 2022 for lung cancer and together with cetuximab in 2024 for colorectal cancer.

== Medical uses ==
Adagrasib is indicated for the treatment of adults with KRAS G12C-mutated locally advanced or metastatic non-small cell lung cancer, as determined by an FDA approved test, who have received at least one prior systemic therapy.

In June 2024, the US FDA granted accelerated approval to adagrasib plus cetuximab for adults with KRAS G12C-mutated locally advanced or metastatic colorectal cancer, as determined by an FDA-approved test, who have received prior treatment with fluoropyrimidine-, oxaliplatin-, and irinotecan-based chemotherapy. Subsequently, after a randomized phase III of cetuximab and adagrasib failed to improve outcomes compared with chemotherapy in patients with previously treated metastatic colorectal cancer, the indication in colorectal cancer was withdrawn.

== History ==
Approval by the US Food and Drug Administration (FDA) was based on KRYSTAL-1, a multicenter, single-arm, open-label clinical trial (NCT03785249) which included participants with locally advanced or metastatic non-small cell lung cancer with KRAS G12C mutations. Efficacy was evaluated in 112 participants whose disease has progressed on or after platinum-based chemotherapy and an immune checkpoint inhibitor, given either concurrently or sequentially.

The FDA granted the application for adagrasib fast-track, breakthrough therapy, and orphan drug designations.

== Society and culture ==
=== Legal status ===
In November 2023, the Committee for Medicinal Products for Human Use of the European Medicines Agency, following a re-examination procedure, adopted a positive opinion recommending the granting of a conditional marketing authorization for the medicinal product Krazati, intended for the treatment of people with KRAS G12C mutation non-small cell lung cancer. The applicant for this medicinal product is Mirati Therapeutics B.V.
