= Sotorasib =

Chemical compound

Clinical data
- Pronunciation: /ˌsoʊtəˈræsɪb/ SOH-tə-RAS-ib
- Trade names: Lumakras, Lumykras
- Other names: AMG 510
- AHFS/Drugs.com: Monograph
- MedlinePlus: a621036
- License data: US DailyMed: Sotorasib
- Pregnancy category: AU: B3
- Routes of administration: By mouth
- Drug class: Antineoplastic agent
- ATC code: L01XX73 (WHO)

Legal status
- Legal status: AU: S4 (Prescription only); CA: ℞-only; US: ℞-only; EU: Rx-only

Identifiers
- IUPAC name: 6-Fluoro-7-(2-fluoro-6-hydroxyphenyl)-(1M)-1-[4-methyl-2-(propan-2-yl)pyridin-3-yl]-4-[(2S)-2- methyl-4-(prop-2-enoyl)piperazin-1-yl]pyrido[2,3-d]pyrimidin-2(1H)-one
- CAS Number: 2296729-00-3; non-specific: 2252403-56-6
- PubChem CID: 137278711
- DrugBank: DB15569
- ChemSpider: 72380148
- UNII: 2B2VM6UC8G
- KEGG: D12055
- ChEBI: CHEBI:178199
- CompTox Dashboard (EPA): DTXSID001099260

Chemical and physical data
- Formula: C_{30}H_{30}F_{2}N_{6}O_{3}
- Molar mass: 560.606 g·mol^{−1}
- 3D model (JSmol): Interactive image
- SMILES: CC(C)c1nccc(C)c1N2C(=O)N=C(N3CCN(C[C@@H]3C)C(=O)C=C)c4cc(F)c(nc24)c5c(O)cccc5F
- InChI: InChI=1S/C30H30F2N6O3/c1-6-23(40)36-12-13-37(18(5)15-36)28-19-14-21(32)26(24-20(31)8-7-9-22(24)39)34-29(19)38(30(41)35-28)27-17(4)10-11-33-25(27)16(2)3/h6-11,14,16,18,39H,1,12-13,15H2,2-5H3/t18-/m0/s1; Key:NXQKSXLFSAEQCZ-SFHVURJKSA-N

Sotorasib, sold under the brand names Lumakras and Lumykras, is an anti-cancer medication used to treat non-small-cell lung cancer. It targets a specific mutation, G12C, in the protein K-Ras encoded by gene KRAS which is responsible for various forms of cancer. Sotorasib is an inhibitor of the RAS GTPase family.

The most common side effects include diarrhea, musculoskeletal pain, nausea, fatigue, liver damage and cough. The most common adverse reactions for sotorasib used in combination with panitumumab include rash, dry skin, diarrhea, stomatitis, fatigue, and musculoskeletal pain.

Sotorasib is the first approved targeted therapy for people with tumors with any KRAS mutation, which accounts for approximately 25% of mutations in non-small cell lung cancers. KRAS G12C mutations occur in about 13% of people with non-small cell lung cancers. While KRAS G12 mutations are common in pancreatic cancer, only 1-2% of pancreatic cancer patients have a G12C mutation, limiting the utility of sotorasib in this cancer.

Sotorasib was approved for medical use in the United States in May 2021, and in the European Union in January 2022. The US Food and Drug Administration considers it to be a first-in-class medication.

== Medical uses ==
In the US, sotorasib is indicated for the treatment of adults with KRAS G12C-mutated locally advanced or metastatic non-small cell lung cancer, as determined by a Food and Drug Administration (FDA)-approved test, who have received at least one prior systemic therapy. It is also indicated, in combination with panitumumab, for the treatment of adults with KRAS G12C-mutated metastatic colorectal cancer as determined by an FDA-approved test, who have received prior fluoropyrimidine-, oxaliplatin- and irinotecan-based chemotherapy.

In the EU, sotorasib, as monotherapy, is indicated for the treatment of adults with advanced non-small cell lung cancer (NSCLC) with KRAS G12C mutation and who have progressed after at least one prior line of systemic therapy.

== Chemistry and pharmacology ==
Sotorasib can exist in either of two atropisomeric forms, and one is more active than the other. It selectively forms an irreversible covalent bond to the sulfur atom in the cysteine residue that is present in the mutated form of KRAS, but not in the normal form.

== History ==
Sotorasib is being developed by Amgen. Phase I clinical trials were completed in 2020. In December 2019, it was approved to begin phase II clinical trials.

Researchers evaluated the efficacy of sotorasib in a study of 124 participants with locally advanced or metastatic KRAS G12C-mutated non-small cell lung cancer with disease progression after receiving an immune checkpoint inhibitor and/or platinum-based chemotherapy. The major outcomes measured were objective response rate (proportion of participants whose tumor is destroyed or reduced) and duration of response. The objective response rate was 36% and 58% of those participants had a duration of response of six months or longer. Sotorasib was evaluated in one non-randomized, dose escalation and dose expansion clinical trial (CodeBreaK 100) in participants with non-small cell lung cancer. There were 124 participants with non-small cell lung cancer included in the primary efficacy population, while 204 participants with non-small cell lung cancer were included in the primary safety population. The primary endpoint of the trial was objective response rate. Approximately 36% of participants (37 of 124 participants) treated with sotorasib in the clinical study CodeBreaK 100 had partial shrinkage of their cancer, including two participants with complete shrinkage. Shrinkage lasted more than six months for 58% of participants who had a response to sotorasib. The trial was conducted at 46 sites in 10 countries (Australia, Austria, Belgium, Canada, France, Germany, Japan, Korea, Switzerland, and the United States).

The US Food and Drug Administration (FDA) granted the application for sotorasib orphan drug, fast track, priority review, and breakthrough therapy designations. The FDA granted approval of Lumakras to Amgen Inc. Sotorasib was approved under the FDA's accelerated approval program.

The efficacy of using sotorasib, in combination with panitumumab, was evaluated in CodeBreaK 300 (NCT05198934), a randomized, open-label, controlled trial in participants with KRAS G12C-mutated mutated metastatic colorectal cancer who previously received fluoropyrimidine-, oxaliplatin-, and irinotecan-based chemotherapy. Mutations were prospectively identified in tumor tissue samples using the QIAGEN therascreen KRAS RGQ PCR kit. A total of 160 participants were randomized (1:1:1) to receive either sotorasib 960 mg orally once daily and panitumumab 6 mg/kg IV every two weeks, sotorasib 240 mg orally once daily and panitumumab 6 mg/kg IV every two weeks, or investigator's choice of standard of care trifluridine/tipiracil or regorafenib.

== Society and culture ==
=== Economics ===
At introduction, in the United States, sotorasib costs US$17,900 per month.

=== Legal status ===
In January of 2021, Health Canada approved sotorasib for treatment of adults with KRAS G12C-mutated locally advanced or metastatic non-small cell lung cancer ho have received at least one prior systemic therapy.

In May 2021, sotorasib was approved under the US Food and Drug Administration (FDA) accelerated approval program. In November 2021, the Committee for Medicinal Products for Human Use of the European Medicines Agency adopted a positive opinion, recommending the granting of a conditional marketing authorization for the medicinal product Lumykras, intended for the treatment of people with KRAS G12C mutation non-small cell lung cancer. The applicant for this medicinal product is Amgen Europe B.V. Sotorasib was approved for medical use in the European Union in January 2022.

In January 2025, the FDA approved sotorasib, in combination with panitumumab, for the treatment of adults with KRAS G12C-mutated metastatic colorectal cancer, as determined by an FDA-approved test, who have received prior fluoropyrimidine-, oxaliplatin-, and irinotecan-based chemotherapy.

=== Names ===
Sotorasib is the international nonproprietary name.

== Research ==
In a randomized phase III trial, sotorasib was compared with docetaxel in 345 patients with KRAS G12C-mutated non-small-cell lung cancer (NSCLC) previously treated with previous platinum-based chemotherapy and a PD-1 or PD-L1 inhibitor. The study showed an improvement in the progression-free survival for sotorasib (960 mg daily), compared with docetaxel (median progression-free survival 5.6 months vs 4.5 months; hazard ratio 0·66; p=0·0017). The radiographic response rate for sotorasib was 28.1% compared with 13.2% response rate for docetaxel. Overall survival was not different between sotorasib and docetaxel. At a meeting of FDA Oncologic Drugs Advisory Committee, FDA staff made comments about design and conduct of the trial that raised concerns about the validity of the conclusions of this trial.

Sotorasib was prepared as an amorphous solid dispersion with at least one polymer, combined with powders using resonant acoustic mixing, for use in tablets. This method was shown to result in an appropriate amount of medication in a dissolution test.
