= Werner syndrome =

Werner syndrome (progeria)
- Werner syndrome has an autosomal recessive pattern of inheritance.
- Specialty: Endocrinology
- Frequency: 0.0005%

Werner syndrome (WS; sometimes Werner's syndrome; also known as adult progeria) is a rare autosomal recessive disorder which is characterized by the appearance of premature aging.

Werner syndrome is named after the German scientist Otto Werner. He identified the syndrome in four siblings observed with premature aging, which he explored as the subject of his dissertation of 1904.

It has a global incidence rate of less than 1 in 100,000 live births (although incidence in Japan and Sardinia is higher, affecting 1 in 20,000–40,000 and 1 in 50,000, respectively). 1,300 cases had been reported as of 2006. Affected individuals typically grow and develop normally until puberty; the mean age of diagnosis is twenty-four, often realized when the adolescent growth spurt is not observed. The youngest person diagnosed was six years old. The median and mean ages of death are 47–48 and 54 years, respectively. The main causes of death are cardiovascular disease and cancer.

== Presentation ==
Werner syndrome patients exhibit growth retardation, short stature, premature graying of hair, alopecia (hair loss), wrinkling, prematurely aged faces with beaked noses, skin atrophy with scleroderma-like lesions, lipodystrophy (loss of fat tissues), abnormal fat deposition leading to thin legs and arms, and severe ulcerations around the Achilles tendon and malleoli (around ankles). Other symptoms include change in voice (weak, hoarse, high-pitched), atrophy of gonads leading to reduced fertility, bilateral cataracts (clouding of lens), premature arteriosclerosis (thickening and loss of elasticity of arteries), calcinosis (calcium deposits in blood vessels), atherosclerosis (blockage of blood vessels), type 2 diabetes, osteoporosis (loss of bone mass), telangiectasia, and malignancies. The prevalence of rare cancers are increased in individuals with Werner syndrome.

=== Gene expression ===
Gene transcription changes found in WS cells are strikingly similar to those observed in normal aging. At the level of gene expression, WRN protein deficiency causes changes in the pattern of gene expression that markedly resemble those of normal old age.

=== Clinical symptoms ===
The mutation in the WRN gene that causes Werner syndrome is autosomal and recessive, meaning that affected people must inherit a copy of the gene from each parent. Patients display rapid premature aging beginning in young adulthood, usually in their early twenties. Diagnosis is based on six cardinal symptoms: premature graying of the hair or hair loss, presence of bilateral cataracts, atrophied or tight skin, soft tissue calcification, sharp facial features, and an abnormal, high-pitched voice. Patients are generally short-statured due to absence of the adolescent growth spurt. Patients also display decreased fertility. The most common symptom of the six is premature graying and loss of hair. This is also generally the earliest observed symptom, with hair loss occurring first on the scalp and the eyebrows.

Werner syndrome patients often have skin that appears shiny and tight, and may also be thin or hardened. This is due to atrophy of the subcutaneous tissue and dermal fibrosis. Over time, the characteristic facial features may be more apparent due to these skin conditions. Other associated skin conditions include ulcers, which are very difficult to treat in Werner syndrome patients, and are caused in part by decreased potential of skin cells for replication.

WS cataracts are distinctly different from those of normal aging. They are associated with problems in the lens posterior cortex and subcapsular regions. These cataracts are generally treatable with cataract surgery, which should restore normal vision.

Symptoms become apparent in the late teens and early twenties and continue to progress. Most patients live to about fifty years of age. The most common causes of death for people are associated diseases and complications, especially atherosclerosis and cancer.

=== Associated diseases ===
Werner syndrome patients are at increased risk for several other diseases, many associated with aging. Atherosclerosis, the thickening of artery walls due to cholesterol buildup, is one common complication. While normal atherosclerosis generally involves the major arteries, smaller arterioles are more likely to be affected. It is possible nervous system disorders are associated. Brain atrophy is present in 40% of patients. Osteoporosis, the loss of bone mineral density common in post-menopausal women, is another common symptom. In contrast with the normal population, the rate of osteoporosis is especially high for male patients. Diabetes mellitus is another common accompaniment. Skin ulcers occur in about 75% of patients – and can be difficult to treat. If skin ulcers become badly infected or develop gangrene, they often require amputation. Unlike most other related diseases and complications, these ulcers are not associated with normal aging.

Patients are also at an increased risk of cancer, especially melanoma. Soft-tissue sarcomas are the most common cancer types. Other types of skin cancer, other epithelial cancers such as thyroid and liver cancers, MDS (myelodysplastic syndrome), and MFH (malignant fibrous histiocytoma) are also prevalent among patients. Mutations in the WRN gene, especially single-nucleotide polymorphisms (SNPs), are associated with many of the cancers and other associated diseases. WRN SNPs correlate with cancers such as sarcomas and non-Hodgkin lymphomas, as well as diabetes and cardiovascular problems including atherosclerosis.

== Causes ==
Approximately 90% of individuals presenting Werner syndrome have any of a range of mutations in the gene, WRN, the only gene currently attributed to cause Werner syndrome. WRN, which lies on chromosome 8 in humans, encodes the WRNp protein, a 1432 amino acid protein with a central domain resembling members of the RecQ helicases. RecQ helicases are a special type of helicase that function at unique times during DNA repair of doubled stranded breaks, which are a form of DNA damage that results in a break of both strands of DNA. Thus, RecQ helicases are important for maintaining DNA stability, and loss of function of these helicases has important implications in the development of Werner syndrome. In addition to the central domain, there are three exonuclease domains at the N-terminus and a Helicase and Ribonuclease D C-terminal (HRDC) domain at the C-terminus.

When functioning normally, the WRN gene and its associated protein (WRNp) are important for maintaining genome stability. WRNp is active in unwinding DNA, a step necessary in DNA repair and DNA replication. Specifically, it has an important role in responding to replication malfunctions, particularly double-stranded breaks, and stalled replication machinery. WRNp may reactivate replication by preventing unwanted recombination processes from occurring or by promoting recombination, depending on the type of DNA damage. In addition, WRNp physically interacts with or binds to several other proteins that are involved in processing DNA. For example, when WRNp binds to RPA, its helicase activity is stimulated. WRNp also physically interacts with p53, a tumor suppressor gene that stops the formation of tumors and the progression of cancers, which inhibits the exonuclease activity of the WRNp. Since WRNp's function depends on DNA, it is only functional when localized to the nucleus.

=== DNA repair processes ===
The finding that WRN protein interacts with DNA-PKcs and the Ku protein complex, combined with evidence that WRN deficient cells produce extensive deletions at sites of joining of non-homologous DNA ends, suggests a role for WRN protein in the DNA repair process of non-homologous end joining (NHEJ). WRN protein also physically interacts with the major NHEJ factor X4L4 (XRCC4-DNA ligase 4 complex). X4L4 stimulates WRN exonuclease activity that likely facilitates DNA end processing prior to final ligation by X4L4.

WRN protein appears to play a role in resolving recombination intermediate structures during homologous recombinational repair (HRR) of DNA double-strand breaks.

WRN protein participates in a complex with RAD51, RAD54, RAD54B and ATR proteins in carrying out the recombination step during inter-strand DNA cross-link repair.

Evidence was presented that WRN protein plays a direct role in the repair of methylation induced DNA damage. This process likely involves the helicase and exonuclease activities of WRN protein that operate together with DNA polymerase beta in long patch base excision repair.

=== Effects on cell structure and function ===
Mutations which cause Werner syndrome all occur at the regions of the gene which encode for protein, and not at non-coding regions. There are 35 different known mutations of WRN, which correspond to stop codons, insertions, or deletions that result in a frameshift mutation. These mutations can have a range of effects. They may decrease the stability of the transcribed messenger RNA (mRNA), which increases the rate at which they are degraded. With less mRNA, less is available to be translated into the WRNp protein. Mutations may also lead to the truncation (shortening) of the WRNp protein, leading to the loss of its nuclear localization signal sequence, thus it is no longer transported into the nucleus where it interacts with the DNA. This leads to a reduction in DNA repair. Furthermore, mutated proteins are more likely to be degraded than normal WRNp. Apart from causing defects in DNA repair, its aberrant association with p53 down-regulates the function of p53, leading to a reduction in p53-dependent apoptosis and increasing the survival of these dysfunctional cells. Cells of affected individuals also have reduced lifespan in culture, have more chromosome breaks and translocations and have extensive deletions.

Patients with Werner syndrome lose the RecQ helicase activity in the WRN protein because of the loss of its C-terminus region, but the mechanism by which this happens is unclear. The loss of the helicase activity can have far-reaching consequences in terms of cell stability and mutation. One instance of these consequences involves telomeres (the ends of chromosomes). It is thought that the WRN helicase activity is important not only for DNA repair and recombination, but also for maintaining telomere length and stability. Thus, WRN helicase is important for preventing catastrophic telomere loss during DNA replication. In a normal cell, the telomeres undergo repeated shortening during the cell cycle, which can prevent the cell from dividing and multiplying. This event can be counteracted by telomerase, an enzyme that extends the ends of the chromosomes by copying the telomeres and synthesizing an identical, but new end that can be added to the existing chromosome. However, patients with Werner syndrome often exhibit accelerated telomere shortening, indicating that there may be a connection between the loss of the WRN helicase activity and telomere and cell instability. While evidence shows that telomere dysfunction is consistent with the premature aging in WS, it has yet to be determined if it is the actual cause of the genomic instability observed in cells and the high rate of cancer in WS patients.

Without the WRN protein, the interwoven pathways of DNA repair and telomere maintenance fail to suppress cancer and the aging symptoms seen in patients with Werner syndrome. Events such as rapid telomere shortening cause WS cells to exhibit low responses to overall cellular stress. In addition to telomere dysfunction, over-expression of oncogenes and oxidation can induce this type of response. High stress causes a synergistic effect, where WS cells become even more sensitive to agents that increase cell stress and agents that damage DNA. As a result, WS cells show a drastic reduction in replicative lifespan and enter into a stage of aging prematurely. The accumulation of these damaged cells due to telomere shortening over many years may be indicative of why WS symptoms only appear after an individual is about twenty years old.

=== Protection of DNA against oxidative damage ===
WRN protein was found to have a specific role in preventing or repairing DNA damages resulting from chronic oxidative stress, particularly in slowly replicating cells. This finding suggested that WRN may be important in dealing with oxidative DNA damage that underlies normal aging (see DNA damage theory of aging).

== Treatment ==
A cure for Werner syndrome has not yet been discovered. It is often treated by managing the associated diseases and relieving symptoms to improve quality of life. The skin ulcers that accompany WS can be treated in several ways, depending on the severity. Topical treatments can be used for minor ulcers, but are not effective in preventing new ulcers from occurring. In the most severe cases, surgery may be required to implant a skin graft or amputate a limb if necessary. Diseases commonly associated with WS such as diabetes and cancer are treated in generally the same ways as they would be for a non-Werner syndrome individual. A change in diet and exercise can help prevent and control arteriosclerosis, and regular cancer screenings can allow for early detection of cancer.

There is evidence that suggests that the cytokine-suppressive anti-inflammatory drug SB203580 may be a possible therapeutic option for patients with WS. This drug targets the p38 signaling pathway, which may become activated as a result of genomic instability and stalled replication forks that are characteristic mutations in WS. This activation of p38 may play a role in the onset of premature cell aging, skin aging, cataracts, and graying of the hair. The p38 pathway has also been implicated in the inflammatory response that causes atherosclerosis, diabetes, and osteoporosis, all of which are associated with WS. This drug has shown to revert the aged characteristics of young WS cells to those seen in normal, young cells and improve the lifespan of WS cells in vitro. SB203580 is in the clinical trial stages, and the same results have not yet been seen in vivo.

In 2010, vitamin C supplementation was found to reverse the premature aging and several tissue dysfunctions in a genetically modified mouse model of the disease. Vitamin C supplementation also appeared to normalize several age-related molecular markers such as the increased levels of the transcription factor NF-κB. In addition, it decreases activity of genes activated in human WS and increases gene activity involved in tissue repair. Supplementation of vitamin C is suspected to be beneficial in the treatment of human WS, although there was no evidence of anti-aging activity in nonmutant mice. In general, treatments are available for only the symptoms or complications and not for the disease itself.

== History ==
Otto Werner was the first to observe Werner syndrome in 1904 as a part of his dissertation research. As a German ophthalmologist, Werner described several progeria-like features and juvenile cataracts in many of his patients. He noticed these symptoms particularly in a family with four sequential children who all showed the characteristics of the syndrome at around the same age. He assumed the cause to be genetic, though most of his evidence was clinical. Between 1934 and 1941, two internists from New York, Oppenheimer and Kugel, coined the term "Werner Syndrome", igniting a wave of interest and research on the disease. During that time, Agatson and Gartner suggested a possible link between WS and cancer. However, it was not until 1966 that there was a general consensus on the autosomal recessive mode of inheritance for the syndrome. By 1981, geneticists had located the WRN gene on chromosome 8, leading to its cloning in 1996. This cloning of the WRN gene was significant because it revealed the predicted WRN protein was made from a family of DNA helicases. Prior to 1996, WS was thought to be a model for accelerated aging. Since the discovery of the gene, it has become clear that the premature aging displayed in WS is not the same, on a cellular level, as normal aging. The role of WRN in DNA repair and its exonuclease and helicase activities have been the subject of many studies in recent years.

Since the initial discovery in 1904, several other cases of WS have been recorded. Many of these cases have occurred in Japan, where a founder effect has caused a higher incidence rate than in other populations. The incidence rate of WS in Japan is approximately 1 case per 100 thousand people (1:100,000), a large contrast with the rate of incidence for the rest of the world, which is between 1:1,000,000 and 1:10,000,000. A founder effect is also apparent in Sardinia, where there have been 18 recorded cases of WS.

== See also ==
- Accelerated aging disease
- Biogerontology
- Cockayne syndrome
- DNA repair
- Degenerative disease
- Genetic disorder
- Life extension
- Progeria
- Senescence
- Xeroderma pigmentosum
- List of cutaneous conditions
- Progeroid syndrome
