= MAPK11 =

Protein-coding gene in the species Homo sapiens

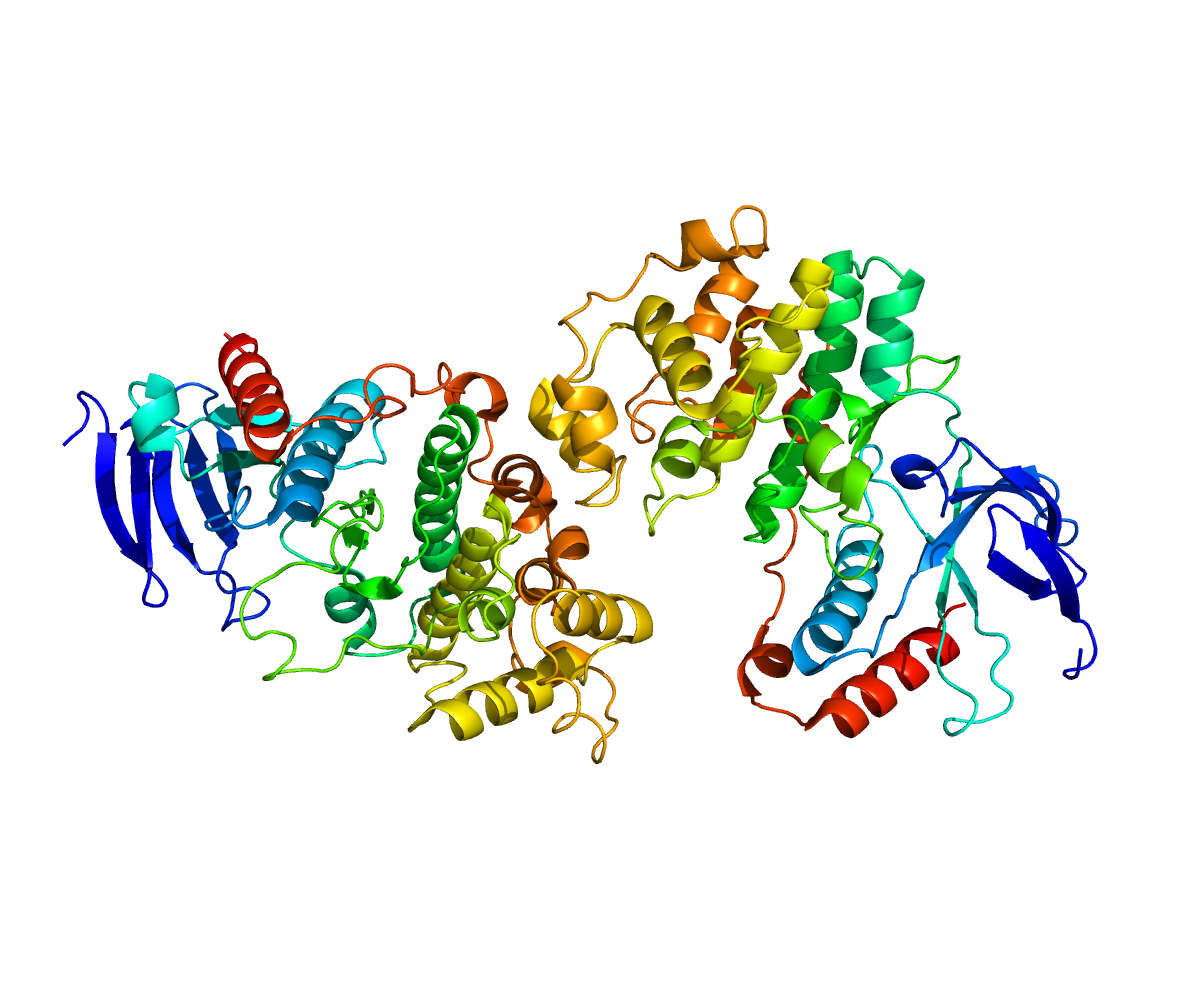

Identifiers
- Aliases: MAPK11, P38B, P38BETA2, PRKM11, SAPK2, SAPK2B, p38-2, p38Beta, mitogen-activated protein kinase 11
- External IDs: OMIM: 602898; MGI: 1338024; GeneCards: MAPK11
Available structures
PDB	Ortholog search: PDBe RCSB
PDB	List of PDB id codes 3GC8, 3GC9, 3GP0
Enzyme activity
EC #	BRENDA	ExPASy	KEGG	MetaCyc
2.7.11.24	↗	↗	↗	↗

Gene location (Human)
Chr.	Chromosome 22 (human)
Band	22q13.33	Start	50,263,713 bp
Band	22q13.33	End	50,270,767 bp

Gene location (Mouse)
Chr.	Chromosome 15 (mouse)
Band	15|15 E3	Start	89,026,689 bp
Band	15|15 E3	End	89,033,831 bp
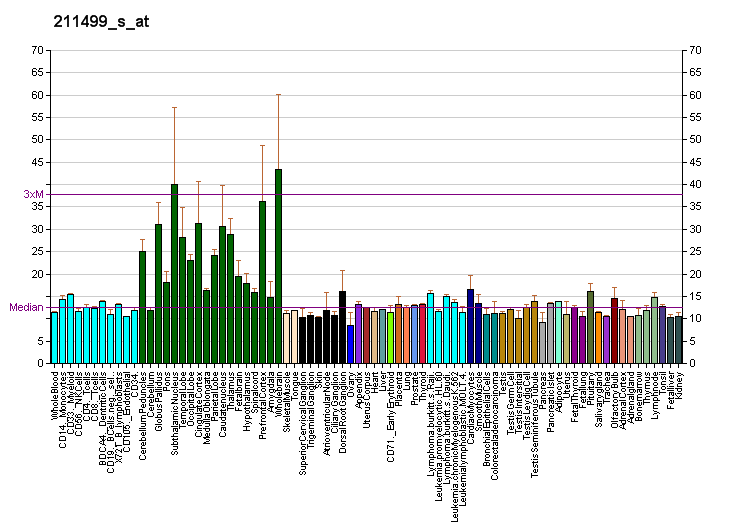

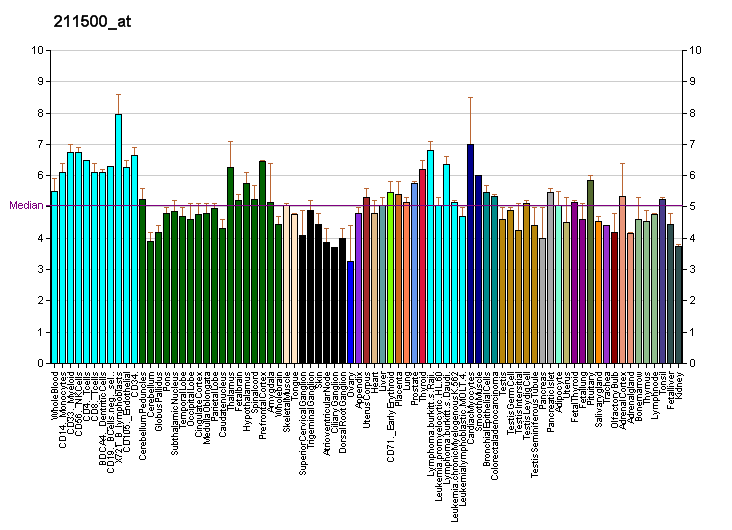

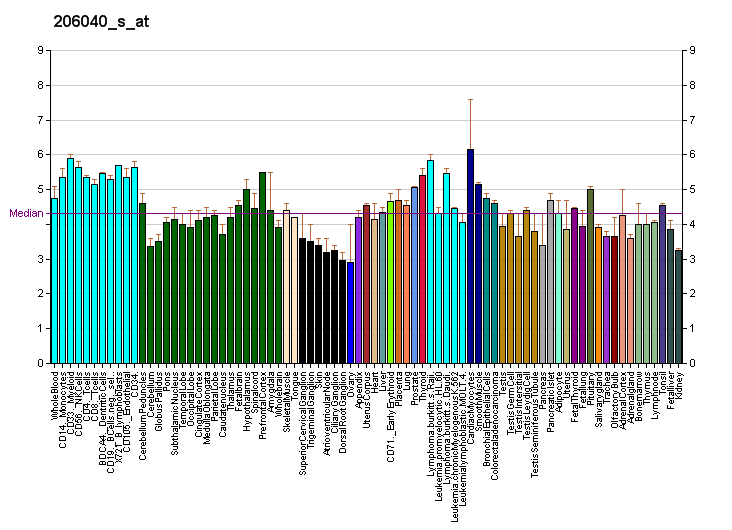
RNA expression pattern
Bgee	Human / Mouse (ortholog); Top expressed in: right frontal lobe; right hemisphere of cerebellum; Brodmann area 9; middle temporal gyrus; cingulate gyrus; anterior cingulate cortex; apex of heart; caudate nucleus; Brodmann area 23; putamen / Top expressed in: lumbar spinal ganglion; ventricular zone; visual cortex; primary visual cortex; tail of embryo; superior frontal gyrus; superior cervical ganglion; ganglionic eminence; primary motor cortex; cerebellar cortex; More reference expression data
BioGPS	More reference expression data
Gene ontology
Molecular function	transferase activity; nucleotide binding; protein kinase activity; MAP kinase activity; kinase activity; protein serine/threonine kinase activity; protein binding; ATP binding
Cellular component	cytosol; nucleoplasm; nucleus; cytoplasm
Biological process	regulation of transcription, DNA-templated; regulation of cardiac muscle cell proliferation; positive regulation of erythrocyte differentiation; phosphorylation; positive regulation of muscle cell differentiation; transcription, DNA-templated; protein phosphorylation; positive regulation of gene expression; negative regulation of cardiac muscle cell proliferation; regulation of signal transduction by p53 class mediator; stress-activated MAPK cascade; cellular response to interleukin-1; regulation of gene expression; intracellular signal transduction; cellular response to organic substance; Ras protein signal transduction; vascular endothelial growth factor receptor signaling pathway; regulation of DNA-binding transcription factor activity
Sources:Amigo / QuickGO
Orthologs
Databases	NCBI: entry; OMA: entry
Species	Human	Mouse
Entrez	5600	19094
Ensembl	ENSG00000185386	ENSMUSG00000053137
UniProt	Q15759	Q9WUI1
RefSeq (mRNA)	NM_002751	NM_011161
RefSeq (protein)	NP_002742	NP_035291
Location (UCSC)	Chr 22: 50.26 – 50.27 Mb	Chr 15: 89.03 – 89.03 Mb
PubMed search
- Wikidata
View/Edit Human	View/Edit Mouse

Mitogen-activated protein kinase 11 is an enzyme that in humans is encoded by the MAPK11 gene.

== Function ==
The protein encoded by this gene is a member of the MAP kinase family. MAP kinases act as an integration point for multiple biochemical signals, and are involved in a wide variety of cellular processes such as proliferation, differentiation, transcription regulation, and development. This kinase is most closely related to p38 MAP kinase, both of which can be activated by proinflammatory cytokines and environmental stress. This kinase is activated through its phosphorylation by MAP kinase kinases (MKKs), preferably by MKK6. Transcription factor ATF2/CREB2 has been shown to be a substrate of this kinase.

== Interactions ==
MAPK11 has been shown to interact with HDAC3 and Promyelocytic leukemia protein.

== See also ==
- p38 mitogen-activated protein kinases
