= CP-944629 =

Names
- Preferred IUPAC name 3-tert-Butyl-6-[4-(2,4,5-trifluorophenyl)-1,3-oxazol-5-yl][1,2,4]triazolo[4,3-a]pyridine

Identifiers
CAS Number	668990-94-1
3D model (JSmol)	Interactive image
ChEMBL	ChEMBL212968
ChemSpider	8174923
PubChem CID	9999342
UNII	KB2ZD36HED
CompTox Dashboard (EPA)	DTXSID1057876
- InChI: InChI=1S/C19H15F3N4O/c1-19(2,3)18-25-24-15-5-4-10(8-26(15)18)17-16(23-9-27-17)11-6-13(21)14(22)7-12(11)20/h4-9H,1-3H3 Key: VNZJNPIWZYMGAO-UHFFFAOYSA-N
- SMILES: CC(C)(C)C1=NN=C2N1C=C(C=C2)C3=C(N=CO3)C4=CC(=C(C=C4F)F)F

Properties
Chemical formula	C_{19}H_{15}F_{3}N_{4}O
Molar mass	372.351 g·mol^{−1}
- Except where otherwise noted, data are given for materials in their standard state (at 25 °C [77 °F], 100 kPa). Infobox references

CP-944629, also known as 5-(3-tert-butyl-[1,2,4]triazolo[4,3-a]pyridin-6-yl)-4-(2,4,5-trifluorophenyl)-1,3-oxazole (IUPAC name), is a small molecule that is predicted to block DNA transcription by inhibiting DNA topoisomerase.

CP-944629 is thought to have anti-tumor activities. CP-944629 is assumed to be a MAPK14 (mitogen-activated protein kinase 14 (human)) inhibitor and a p38alpha inhibitor.
