= NJK14047 =

Chemical compound

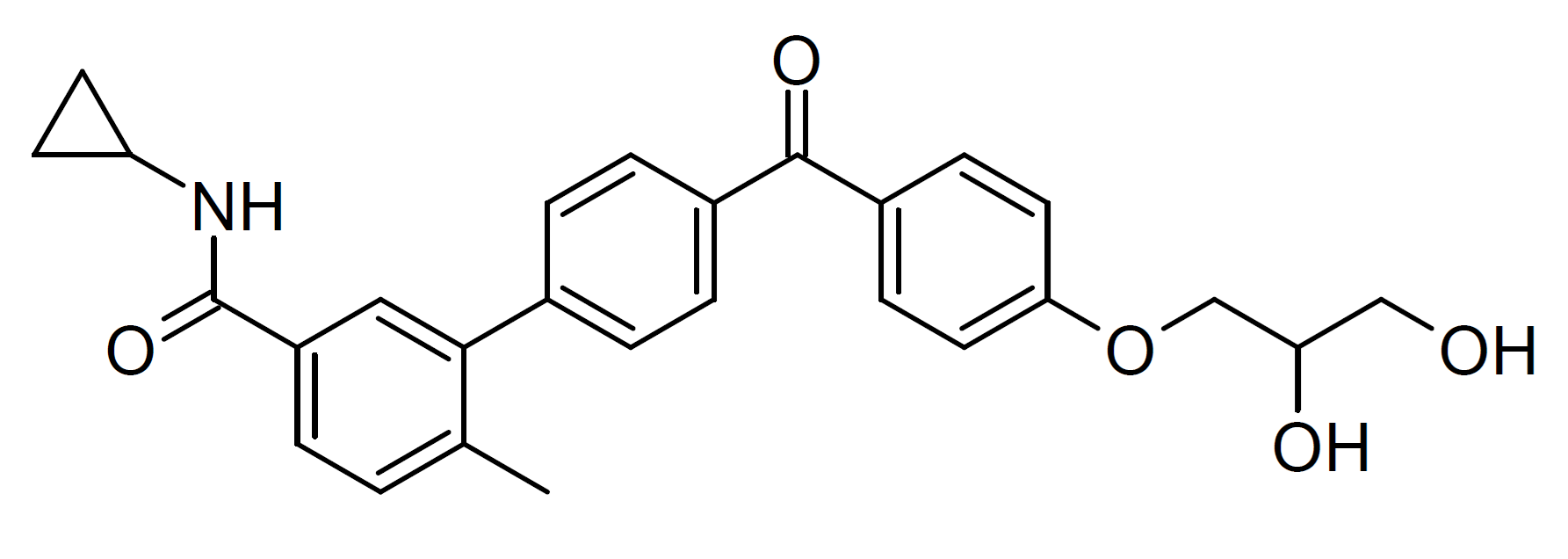

Identifiers
- IUPAC name: N-cyclopropyl-3-[4-[4-(2,3-dihydroxypropoxy)benzoyl]phenyl]-4-methylbenzamide
- CAS Number: 1800576-41-3
- PubChem CID: 135395450
- ChemSpider: 71060140

Chemical and physical data
- Formula: C_{27}H_{27}NO_{5}
- Molar mass: 445.515 g·mol^{−1}
- 3D model (JSmol): Interactive image
- SMILES: CC1=C(C=C(C=C1)C(=O)NC2CC2)C3=CC=C(C=C3)C(=O)C4=CC=C(C=C4)OCC(CO)O
- InChI: InChI=1S/C27H27NO5/c1-17-2-3-21(27(32)28-22-10-11-22)14-25(17)18-4-6-19(7-5-18)26(31)20-8-12-24(13-9-20)33-16-23(30)15-29/h2-9,12-14,22-23,29-30H,10-11,15-16H2,1H3,(H,28,32); Key:ZQIUCYZGBDPMLG-UHFFFAOYSA-N

NJK14047 is a drug which acts as a selective inhibitor of the enzyme p38 mitogen-activated protein kinase (p38 MAPK). It has antiviral and antiinflammatory effects and was originally developed as a potential treatment for inflammatory lung conditions such as influenza. Subsequent research has also shown promise for various other conditions in which inflammation plays a role, including Alzheimer's disease, asthma, arthritis and psoriasis.

== See also ==
- Pamapimod
- PH-797804
