= JDP =

JDP may refer to:

== Architecture ==
- The Jacqueline Du Pré Music Building, St Hilda's College, Oxford, England
- Yugoslav Drama Theatre or Jugoslovensko Dramsko Pozorište (JDP), a theatre in Belgrade, Serbia
- John D Parker Junior school, an elementary school located in Ontario, Canada

== Politics ==
- Jackie Doyle-Price (born 1969), British Conservative politician
- Japan Democratic Party (1954), a right-wing political party in Japan 1954–1955
- Jharkhand Disom Party, a political party in India
- Justice and Development Party (Turkey), a political party in Turkey

== Other ==
- Juicy Drop Pop, a brand of lollipops
- Jun dimerization protein, a member of the AP-1 family of transcription factors
- J.D. Power, a global marketing information services firm
