= Oolonghomobisflavan B =

Names
- IUPAC name [8-[[5,7-Dihydroxy-3-(3,4,5-trihydroxybenzoyl)oxy-2-(3,4,5-trihydroxyphenyl)-3,4-dihydro-2H-chromen-6-yl]methyl]-5,7-dihydroxy-2-(3,4,5-trihydroxyphenyl)-3,4-dihydro-2H-chromen-3-yl] 3,4,5-trihydroxybenzoate

Identifiers
CAS Number	126715-88-6
3D model (JSmol)	Interactive image
PubChem CID	14520995
- SMILES: C1C(C(OC2=C1C(=CC(=C2CC3=C(C4=C(C=C3O)OC(C(C4)OC(=O)C5=CC(=C(C(=C5)O)O)O)C6=CC(=C(C(=C6)O)O)O)O)O)O)C7=CC(=C(C(=C7)O)O)O)OC(=O)C8=CC(=C(C(=C8)O)O)O

Properties
Chemical formula	C_{45}H_{36}O_{22}
Molar mass	928.761 g·mol^{−1}
- Except where otherwise noted, data are given for materials in their standard state (at 25 °C [77 °F], 100 kPa). Infobox references

Oolonghomobisflavan B is an oolong tea polymerized polyphenol that can boost lipid metabolism-related gene expression. It can suppress p38 MAPK activation.
