= RPS6KA4 =

Enzyme found in humans

Identifiers
- Aliases: RPS6KA4, MSK2, RSK-B, S6K-alpha-4, ribosomal protein S6 kinase A4
- External IDs: OMIM: 603606; MGI: 1930076; GeneCards: RPS6KA4
Enzyme activity
| EC # | BRENDA | ExPASy | KEGG | MetaCyc |
|---|---|---|---|---|
| 2.7.11.1 | ↗ | ↗ | ↗ | ↗ |

Gene location (Human)
| Chr. | Chromosome 11 (human) |
| Band | 11q13.1 | Start | 64,359,148 bp |
| Band | 11q13.1 | End | 64,372,215 bp |

Gene location (Mouse)
| Chr. | Chromosome 19 (mouse) |
| Band | 19|19 A | Start | 6,806,578 bp |
| Band | 19|19 A | End | 6,818,004 bp |
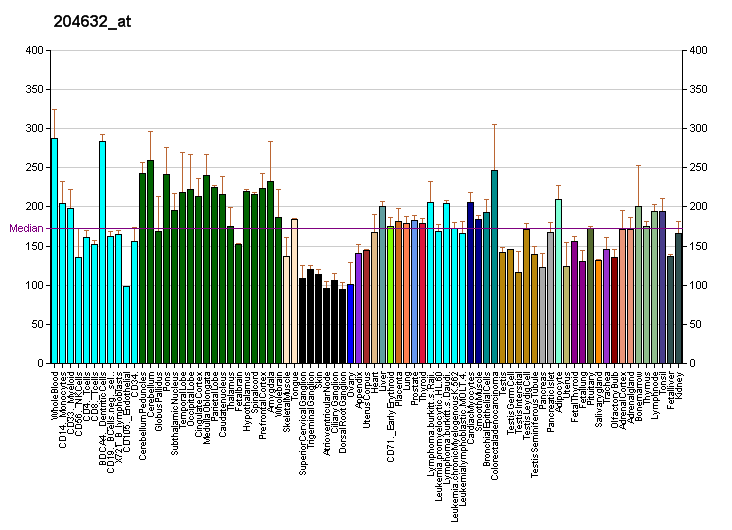
RNA expression pattern
| Bgee | Human / Mouse (ortholog); Top expressed in: right hemisphere of cerebellum; granulocyte; monocyte; right frontal lobe; apex of heart; right coronary artery; mucosa of transverse colon; cingulate gyrus; prefrontal cortex; anterior cingulate cortex / n/a; More reference expression data |
| BioGPS | More reference expression data |
Gene ontology
| Molecular function | transferase activity; nucleotide binding; protein kinase activity; metal ion binding; kinase activity; protein serine/threonine kinase activity; ribosomal protein S6 kinase activity; protein binding; ATP binding; magnesium ion binding |
| Cellular component | nucleoplasm; nucleus; cytoplasm; cytosol |
| Biological process | intracellular signal transduction; regulation of transcription, DNA-templated; phosphorylation; positive regulation of histone acetylation; interleukin-1-mediated signaling pathway; protein phosphorylation; positive regulation of CREB transcription factor activity; positive regulation of NF-kappaB transcription factor activity; inflammatory response; negative regulation of cytokine production; positive regulation of transcription by RNA polymerase II |
Sources:Amigo / QuickGO
Orthologs
| Databases | NCBI: entry; OMA: entry |
| Species | Human | Mouse |
| Entrez | 8986 | 56613 |
| Ensembl | ENSG00000162302 | ENSMUSG00000118668 |
| UniProt | O75676 | Q9Z2B9 |
| RefSeq (mRNA) | NM_001006944; NM_001300802; NM_003942; NM_001318361 | NM_019924 |
| RefSeq (protein) | NP_001006945; NP_001287731; NP_001305290; NP_003933 | NP_064308 |
| Location (UCSC) | Chr 11: 64.36 – 64.37 Mb | Chr 19: 6.81 – 6.82 Mb |
| PubMed search |
- Wikidata
| View/Edit Human | View/Edit Mouse |

Ribosomal protein S6 kinase alpha-4 is an enzyme that in humans is encoded by the RPS6KA4 gene.

== Function ==
This gene encodes a member of the RSK (ribosomal S6 kinase) family of serine/threonine kinases. This kinase contains 2 non-identical kinase catalytic domains and phosphorylates various substrates, including CREB1 and c-Fos. Alternate transcriptional splice variants of this gene have been observed but have not been thoroughly characterized.

== Interactions ==
RPS6KA4 has been shown to interact with MAPK14.
