= MAPK13 =

Protein-coding gene in the species Homo sapiens

Identifiers
- Aliases: MAPK13, MAPK 13, MAPK-13, PRKM13, SAPK4, p38delta, mitogen-activated protein kinase 13
- External IDs: OMIM: 602899; MGI: 1346864; GeneCards: MAPK13
Available structures
PDB	Ortholog search: PDBe RCSB
PDB	List of PDB id codes 3COI, 4EYJ, 4EYM, 4MYG, 4YNO, 5EKO, 5EKN
Enzyme activity
EC #	BRENDA	ExPASy	KEGG	MetaCyc
2.7.11.24	↗	↗	↗	↗

Gene location (Human)
Chr.	Chromosome 6 (human)
Band	6p21.31	Start	36,127,809 bp
Band	6p21.31	End	36,144,524 bp

Gene location (Mouse)
Chr.	Chromosome 17 (mouse)
Band	17|17 A3.3	Start	28,988,271 bp
Band	17|17 A3.3	End	28,999,207 bp
RNA expression pattern
Bgee	Human / Mouse (ortholog); Top expressed in: gums; mucosa of transverse colon; right adrenal gland; right adrenal cortex; gingival epithelium; left adrenal gland; mucosa of ileum; human penis; left adrenal cortex; parotid gland / Top expressed in: granulocyte; lip; crypt of lieberkuhn of small intestine; epithelium of stomach; duodenum; large intestine; ileum; colon; intestinal villus; jejunum; More reference expression data
BioGPS	n/a
Gene ontology
Molecular function	transferase activity; nucleotide binding; protein kinase activity; MAP kinase activity; kinase activity; protein serine/threonine kinase activity; protein binding; ATP binding
Cellular component	cytosol; nucleus; cytoplasm
Biological process	positive regulation of inflammatory response; regulation of transcription, DNA-templated; phosphorylation; transcription, DNA-templated; response to osmotic stress; protein phosphorylation; peptidyl-serine phosphorylation; positive regulation of interleukin-6 production; cell cycle; regulation of gene expression; cellular response to UV; stress-activated MAPK cascade; cellular response to hydrogen peroxide; cellular response to interleukin-1; cellular response to sorbitol; cellular response to anisomycin; cellular response to sodium arsenite; MAPK cascade; intracellular signal transduction; cellular response to organic substance
Sources:Amigo / QuickGO
Orthologs
Databases	NCBI: entry; OMA: entry
Species	Human	Mouse
Entrez	5603	26415
Ensembl	ENSG00000156711	ENSMUSG00000004864
UniProt	O15264	Q9Z1B7
RefSeq (mRNA)	NM_002754	NM_011950
RefSeq (protein)	NP_002745	NP_036080
Location (UCSC)	Chr 6: 36.13 – 36.14 Mb	Chr 17: 28.99 – 29 Mb
PubMed search
- Wikidata
View/Edit Human	View/Edit Mouse

Mitogen-activated protein kinase 13 (MAPK 13), also known as stress-activated protein kinase 4 (SAPK4), is an enzyme that in humans is encoded by the MAPK13 gene.

== Function ==
The protein encoded by this gene is a member of the MAP kinase family. MAP kinases act as an integration point for multiple biochemical signals, and are involved in a wide variety of cellular processes such as proliferation, differentiation, transcription regulation and development. This kinase is closely related to p38 MAP kinase, both of which can be activated by proinflammatory cytokines and cellular stress. MAP kinase kinases 3, and 6 can phosphorylate and activate this kinase. Transcription factor ATF2, and microtubule dynamics regulator stathmin have been shown to be the substrates of this kinase.
