= PH-797804 =

Chemical compound

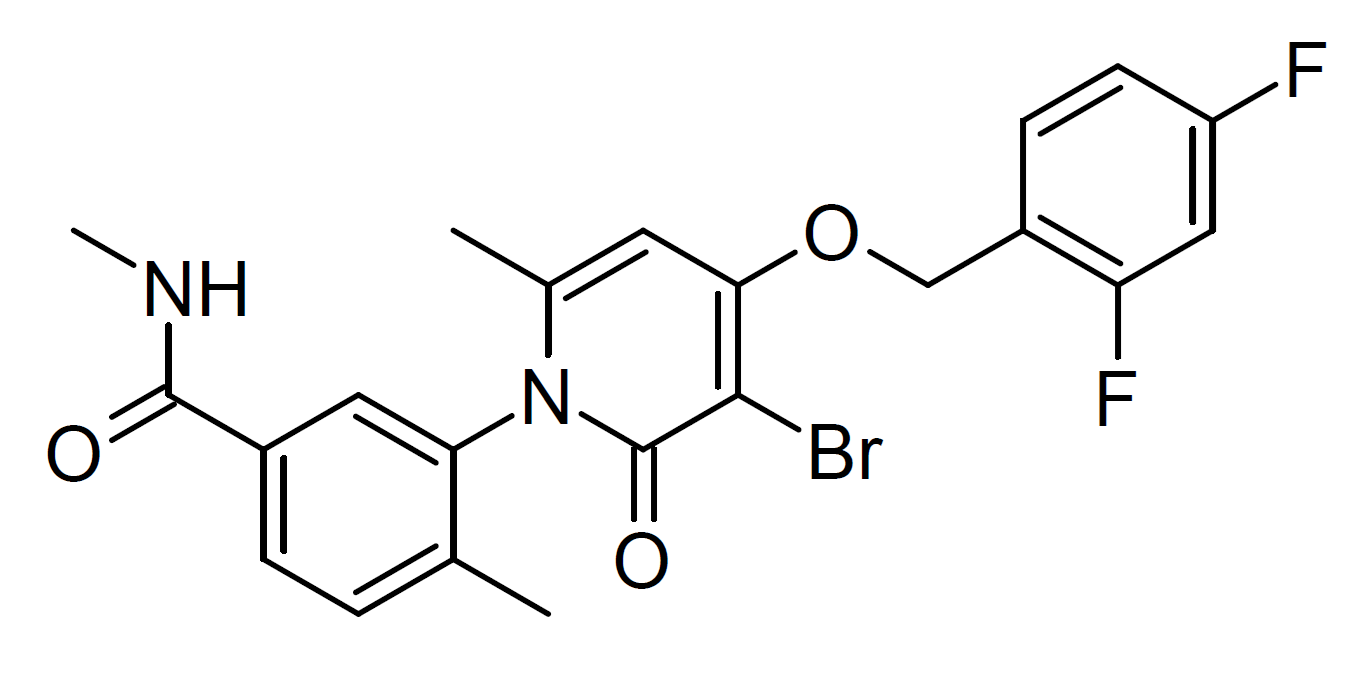

Identifiers
- IUPAC name: 3-[3-bromo-4-[(2,4-difluorophenyl)methoxy]-6-methyl-2-oxopyridin-1-yl]-N,4-dimethylbenzamide
- CAS Number: 586379-66-0
- PubChem CID: 22049997
- IUPHAR/BPS: 7818
- DrugBank: DB07941
- ChemSpider: 10796940
- UNII: SI09I1V827
- ChEBI: CHEBI:82715
- ChEMBL: ChEMBL1088751
- CompTox Dashboard (EPA): DTXSID70207342

Chemical and physical data
- Formula: C_{22}H_{19}BrF_{2}N_{2}O_{3}
- Molar mass: 477.306 g·mol^{−1}
- 3D model (JSmol): Interactive image
- SMILES: CC1=C(C=C(C=C1)C(=O)NC)N2C(=CC(=C(C2=O)Br)OCC3=C(C=C(C=C3)F)F)C
- InChI: InChI=1S/C22H19BrF2N2O3/c1-12-4-5-14(21(28)26-3)9-18(12)27-13(2)8-19(20(23)22(27)29)30-11-15-6-7-16(24)10-17(15)25/h4-10H,11H2,1-3H3,(H,26,28); Key:KCAJXIDMCNPGHZ-UHFFFAOYSA-N

PH-797804 is a drug which acts as a selective inhibitor of the enzyme p38 mitogen-activated protein kinase (p38 MAPK). It has antiinflammatory effects and has been researched for the treatment of inflammatory lung conditions such as chronic obstructive pulmonary disease and COVID-19. While it has not been adopted for clinical use, it remains widely used in research.

== See also ==
- NJK14047
- Pamapimod
