= MAPK14 =

Protein-coding gene in humans

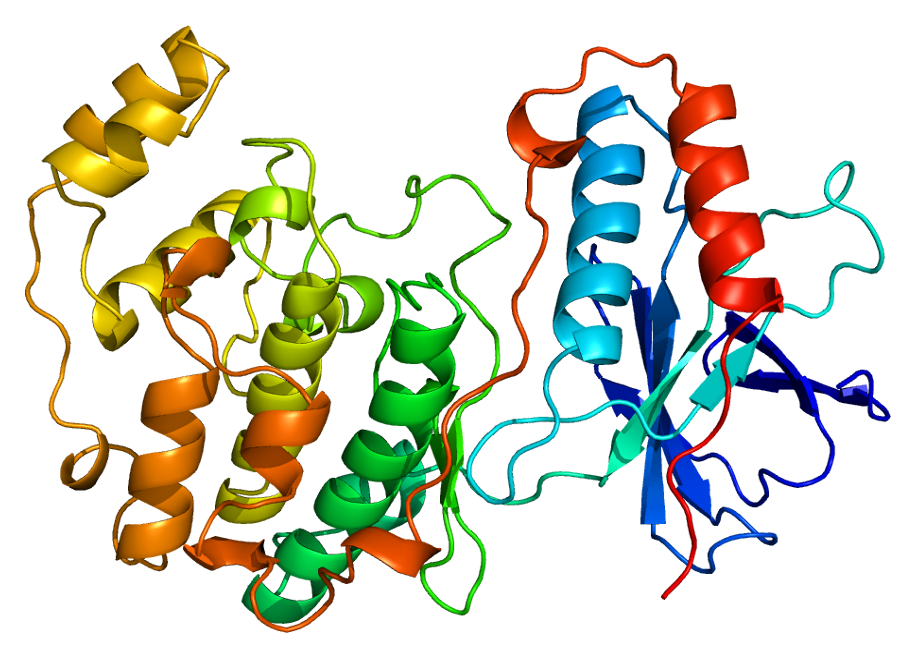

Identifiers
- Aliases: MAPK14, CSBP, CSBP1, CSBP2, CSPB1, EXIP, Mxi2, PRKM14, PRKM15, RK, SAPK2A, p38, p38ALPHA, mitogen-activated protein kinase 14
- External IDs: OMIM: 600289; MGI: 1346865; GeneCards: MAPK14
Available structures
| PDB | Ortholog search: PDBe RCSB |
| PDB | List of PDB id codes 1A9U, 1BL6, 1BL7, 1BMK, 1DI9, 1IAN, 1KV1, 1KV2, 1M7Q, 1OUK, 1OUY, 1OVE, 1OZ1, 1R39, 1R3C, 1W7H, 1W82, 1W83, 1W84, 1WBN, 1WBO, 1WBS, 1WBT, 1WBV, 1WBW, 1WFC, 1YQJ, 1ZYJ, 1ZZ2, 1ZZL, 2BAJ, 2BAK, 2BAL, 2BAQ, 2FSL, 2FSM, 2FSO, 2FST, 2GFS, 2I0H, 2LGC, 2NPQ, 2OKR, 2ONL, 2QD9, 2RG5, 2RG6, 2Y8O, 2YIS, 2YIW, 2YIX, 2ZAZ, 2ZB0, 2ZB1, 3BV2, 3BV3, 3BX5, 3C5U, 3CTQ, 3D7Z, 3D83, 3DS6, 3DT1, 3E92, 3E93, 3FI4, 3FKL, 3FKN, 3FKO, 3FL4, 3FLN, 3FLQ, 3FLS, 3FLW, 3FLY, 3FLZ, 3FMH, 3FMJ, 3FMK, 3FML, 3FMM, 3FMN, 3FSF, 3FSK, 3GC7, 3GCP, 3GCQ, 3GCS, 3GCU, 3GCV, 3GFE, 3GI3, 3HA8, 3HEC, 3HEG, 3HL7, 3HLL, 3HP2, 3HP5, 3HRB, 3HUB, 3HUC, 3HV3, 3HV4, 3HV5, 3HV6, 3HV7, 3HVC, 3IPH, 3ITZ, 3IW5, 3IW6, 3IW7, 3IW8, 3K3I, 3K3J, 3KF7, 3KQ7, 3L8S, 3L8X, 3LFA, 3LFB, 3LFC, 3LFD, 3LFE, 3LFF, 3LHJ, 3MGY, 3MH0, 3MH1, 3MH2, 3MH3, 3MPA, 3MPT, 3MVL, 3MVM, 3MW1, 3NEW, 3NNU, 3NNV, 3NNW, 3NNX, 3NWW, 3O8P, 3O8T, 3O8U, 3OBG, 3OBJ, 3OC1, 3OCG, 3OD6, 3ODY, 3ODZ, 3OEF, 3PG3, 3QUD, 3QUE, 3RIN, 3ROC, 3S3I, 3S4Q, 3U8W, 3UVP, 3UVQ, 3UVR, 3ZS5, 3ZSG, 3ZSH, 3ZSI, 3ZYA, 4A9Y, 4AA0, 4AA4, 4AA5, 4AAC, 4DLI, 4DLJ, 4E5A, 4E5B, 4E6A, 4E6C, 4E8A, 4EH2, 4EH3, 4EH4, 4EH5, 4EH6, 4EH7, 4EH8, 4EH9, 4EHV, 4EWQ, 4F9W, 4F9Y, 4FA2, 4GEO, 4KIN, 4KIP, 4KIQ, 4L8M, 3FC1, 4R3C, 5ETC, 5ETI, 4ZTH |
Enzyme activity
| EC # | BRENDA | ExPASy | KEGG | MetaCyc |
|---|---|---|---|---|
| 2.7.11.24 | ↗ | ↗ | ↗ | ↗ |

Gene location (Human)
| Chr. | Chromosome 6 (human) |
| Band | 6p21.31 | Start | 36,027,677 bp |
| Band | 6p21.31 | End | 36,111,236 bp |

Gene location (Mouse)
| Chr. | Chromosome 17 (mouse) |
| Band | 17 A3.3|17 14.85 cM | Start | 28,910,303 bp |
| Band | 17 A3.3|17 14.85 cM | End | 28,967,380 bp |
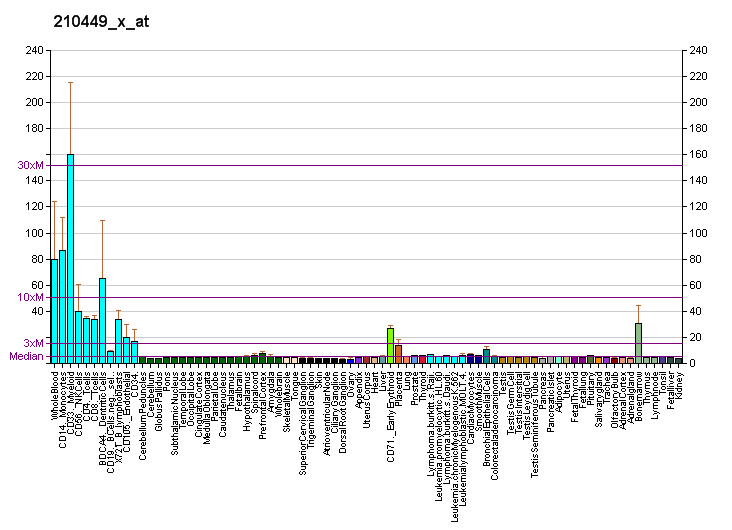

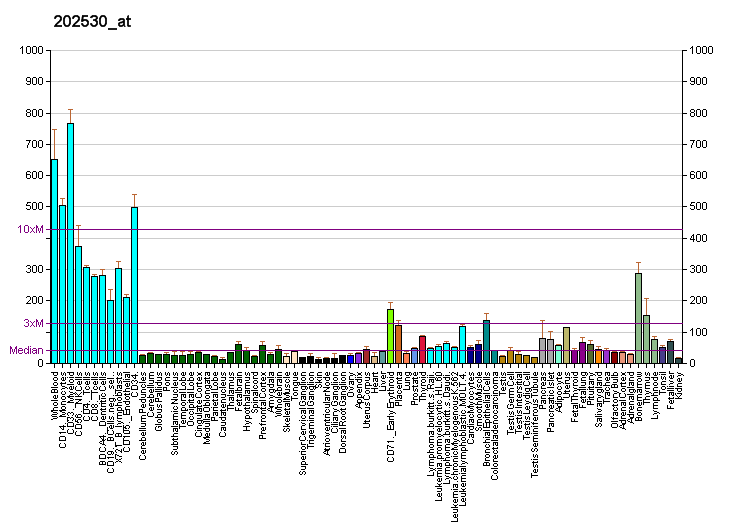

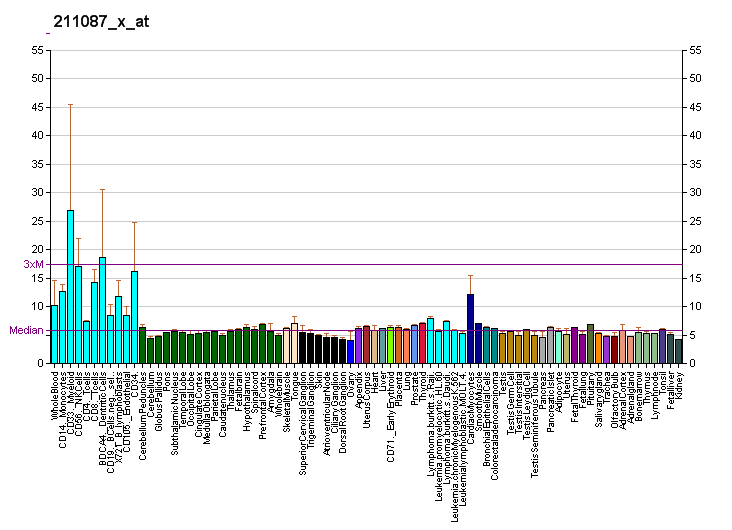
RNA expression pattern
| Bgee | Human / Mouse (ortholog); Top expressed in: buccal mucosa cell; blood; bone marrow; bone marrow cell; monocyte; trabecular bone; Achilles tendon; endothelial cell; granulocyte; stromal cell of endometrium / Top expressed in: granulocyte; renal corpuscle; medullary collecting duct; blood; conjunctival fornix; knee joint; triceps brachii muscle; primitive streak; masseter muscle; vastus lateralis muscle; More reference expression data |
| BioGPS | More reference expression data |
Gene ontology
| Molecular function | kinase activity; protein phosphatase binding; ATP binding; protein kinase activity; MAP kinase activity; protein serine/threonine kinase activity; enzyme binding; NFAT protein binding; transferase activity; protein binding; nucleotide binding; MAP kinase kinase activity; mitogen-activated protein kinase p38 binding |
| Cellular component | cytosol; mitochondrion; spindle pole; extracellular region; nucleoplasm; nuclear speck; secretory granule lumen; ficolin-1-rich granule lumen; nucleus; cytoplasm; glutamatergic synapse |
| Biological process | positive regulation of glucose import; positive regulation of muscle cell differentiation; placenta development; regulation of transcription by RNA polymerase II; cellular response to DNA damage stimulus; protein phosphorylation; cell surface receptor signaling pathway; positive regulation of reactive oxygen species metabolic process; positive regulation of cardiac muscle cell proliferation; fatty acid oxidation; angiogenesis; positive regulation of blood vessel endothelial cell migration; glucose metabolic process; cellular response to ionizing radiation; negative regulation of canonical Wnt signaling pathway; apoptotic process; response to muscle stretch; regulation of transcription, DNA-templated; positive regulation of erythrocyte differentiation; stress-induced premature senescence; osteoclast differentiation; response to muramyl dipeptide; transcription, DNA-templated; p38MAPK cascade; positive regulation of protein import into nucleus; 3'-UTR-mediated mRNA stabilization; myoblast differentiation involved in skeletal muscle regeneration; chondrocyte differentiation; phosphorylation; signal transduction in response to DNA damage; chemotaxis; positive regulation of myoblast fusion; response to lipopolysaccharide; positive regulation of cyclase activity; cartilage condensation; lipopolysaccharide-mediated signaling pathway; positive regulation of myotube differentiation; intracellular signal transduction; regulation of cytokine production involved in inflammatory response; DNA damage checkpoint signaling; positive regulation of gene expression; transmembrane receptor protein serine/threonine kinase signaling pathway; positive regulation of myoblast differentiation; peptidyl-serine phosphorylation; cell morphogenesis; striated muscle cell differentiation; cellular response to vascular endothelial growth factor stimulus; cellular response to lipopolysaccharide; positive regulation of brown fat cell differentiation; skeletal muscle tissue development; positive regulation of transcription by RNA polymerase II; signal transduction; regulation of signal transduction by p53 class mediator; regulation of ossification; neutrophil degranulation; positive regulation of macrophage chemotaxis; positive regulation of metallopeptidase activity; cellular response to lipoteichoic acid; cellular response to tumor necrosis factor; vascular endothelial growth factor receptor signaling pathway; regulation of synaptic membrane adhesion; regulation of gene expression; cellular response to organic substance; Ras protein signal transduction; regulation of DNA-binding transcription factor activity |
Sources:Amigo / QuickGO
Orthologs
| Databases | NCBI: entry; OMA: entry |
| Species | Human | Mouse |
| Entrez | 1432 | 26416 |
| Ensembl | ENSG00000112062 | ENSMUSG00000053436 |
| UniProt | Q16539 | P47811 |
| RefSeq (mRNA) | NM_001315; NM_139012; NM_139013; NM_139014 | NM_001168508; NM_001168513; NM_001168514; NM_011951; NM_001357724 |
| RefSeq (protein) | NP_001306; NP_620581; NP_620582; NP_620583 | NP_001161980; NP_001161985; NP_001161986; NP_036081; NP_001344653 |
| Location (UCSC) | Chr 6: 36.03 – 36.11 Mb | Chr 17: 28.91 – 28.97 Mb |
| PubMed search |
- Wikidata
| View/Edit Human | View/Edit Mouse |

Mitogen-activated protein kinase 14, also called p38-α, is an enzyme that in humans is encoded by the MAPK14 gene.

MAPK14 encodes p38α mitogen-activated protein kinase (MAPK) which is the prototypic member of the p38 MAPK family. p38 MAPKs are also known as stress-activated serine/threonine-specific kinases (SAPKs). In addition to MAPK14 for p38α MAPK, the p38 MAPK family has three additional members, including MAPK11, MAPK12 and MAPK13 which encodes p38β MAPK, p38γ MAPK and p38δ MAPK isoforms, respectively. p38α MAPK was originally identified as a tyrosine phosphorylated protein detected in activated immune cell macrophages with an essential role in inflammatory cytokine induction, such as Tumor Necrotic Factor α (TNFα). However, p38α MAPK mediated kinase activity has been implicated in many tissues beyond immune systems. p38α MAPK is mainly activated through MAPK kinase kinase cascades and exerts its biological function via downstream substrate phosphorylation. p38α MAPK is implicated in diverse cellular functions, from gene expression to programmed cell death through a network of signaling molecules and transcription factors. Pharmacological and genetic inhibition of p38α MAPK not only revealed its biological significance in physiological function but also the potential of targeting p38α MAPK in human disease such as immune disorders and heart failure.

== Structure ==
MAPK14 is a 41 kDa protein composed of 360 amino acids.

== Function ==
The protein encoded by this gene is a member of the MAP kinase family. MAP kinases act as an integration point for multiple biochemical signals, and are involved in a wide variety of cellular processes such as proliferation, differentiation, transcription regulation and development. This kinase is activated by various environmental stresses and proinflammatory cytokines. The activation requires its phosphorylation by MAP kinase kinases (MKKs), or its autophosphorylation triggered by the interaction of MAP3K7IP1/TAB1 protein with this kinase. The substrates of this kinase include transcription regulator ATF2, MEF2C, and MAX, cell cycle regulator CDC25B, and tumor suppressor p53, which suggest the roles of this kinase in stress-related transcription and cell cycle regulation, as well as in genotoxic stress response. Four alternatively spliced transcript variants of this gene encoding distinct isoforms have been reported.

p38α MAPK is ubiquitously expressed in many cell types, in contrast, p38β MAPK is highly expressed in brain and lung, p38γ MAPK mostly in skeletal muscle and nerve system, and p38δ MAPK in uterus and pancreas. Like all MAP kinases, p38α MAPK has 11 conserved domains (Domains I to XI) and a Thr-Gly-Tyr (TGY) dual phosphorylation motif. Activation of p38 MAPK pathway has been implicated in a variety of stress response in addition to inflammation, including osmotic shock, heat, and oxidative stress. The canonical pathway for p38 MAPK activation involve a cascade of protein kinases, including MAP3K such as MEKK1, 2, 3 and 4, TGFβ-activated kinase (TAK1), TAO1-3, mixed-lineage kinase 2/3 (MLK2/3), and apoptosis signal-regulating kinase 1/2 (ASK1/2), as well as MAP2Ks, such as MKK3, 6 and 4. MAP2K mediated phosphorylation of the TGY motif results in conformational change of p38 MAPK which allows kinase activation and accessibility to substrates. In addition, TAK1-binding protein 1 (TAB1) and ZAP70 can induce p38 MAPK via non-canonical autophosphorylation. Furthermore, acetylation of p38 MAPK at lys-53 of the ATP-binding pocket also enhances p38 MAPK activity during cellular stress Under basal conditions, p38α MAPK is detected in both the nucleus and the cytoplasm. One of the consequences of p38 MAPK activation is translocation into the nucleus. involving both p38 MAPK phosphorylation and microtubule- and dynein-dependent process. In addition, one substrate of p38 MAPK, MAP kinase-activated protein kinase 2 (MAPAK2 or MK2) can modulate and direct p38α MAPK localization to cytosole via direct interaction. p38α MAPK activation can be reversed by dephosphorylation of the TGY motif carried out by protein phosphatases, including ser-thr protein phosphatases (PPs), protein tyrosine phosphatases (PTP), and dual-specificity phosphatases (DUSP). For example, ser/thr phosphatases PP2Cα/β suppress activity of p38s MAPK through direct interaction as well as suppression of MKKs/TAK1 in mammalian cells. Hematopoietic PTP (HePTP) and striatal-enriched phosphatase (STEP) bind to MAPKs through a kinase-interaction motif (KIM) and inactivates them by dephosphorylating the phosphotyrosine residue in their activation loop. DUSPs, which have a docking domain to MAPKs and dual-specific phosphatase activity, can also bind to p38 MAPKs and dephosphorylate of both phosphotyrosine and phosphothreonine residues. In addition to these phosphatases, other molecular components such as Hsp90-Cdc37 chaperone complex can also modulate p38 MAPK autophosphorylation activity and prevents non-canonical activation.

p38α MAPK is implicated in cell survival/apoptosis, proliferation, differentiation, migration, mRNA stability, and inflammatory response in different cell types through variety of different target molecules MK2 is one of the well-studied downstream targets of p38α MAPK. Their downstream substrates include small heat shock protein 27 (HSP27), lymphocyte-specific protein1 (LSP1), cAMP response element-binding protein (CREB), cyclooxygenase 2 (COX2), activating transcription factor 1 (ATF1), serum response factor (SRF), and mRNA-binding protein tristetraprolin (TTP) In addition to protein kinases, many transcription factors are downstream targets of p38α MAPK, including ATF1/2/6, c-Myc, c-FOS, GATA4, MEF2A/C, SRF, STAT1, and CHOP.

== Role in cardiovascular system ==
p38α MAPK constitutes the main p38 MAPK activity in heart. During cardiomyocyte maturation in new born mouse heart, p38α MAPK activity can regulate myocyte cytokinesis and promote cell cycle exit. while inhibition of p38 MAPK activity leads to induction of mitosis in both adult and fetal cardiomyocyte. Therefore, p38 MAPK is associated with cell-cycle arrest in mammalian cardiomyocytes and its inhibition may represent a strategy to promote cardiac regeneration in response to injury. In addition, p38α MAPK induction promotes myocyte apoptosis. via downstream targets STAT1, CHOP, FAK, SMAD, cytochrome c, NF-κB, PTEN, and p53. p38 MAPK can also target IRS-1 mediated AKT signaling and promotes myocyte death under chronic insulin stimulation. Inhibition of p38 MAPK activity confers cardioprotection against ischemia reperfusion injury in heart However, some reports demonstrated that p38 MAPK also involves in anti-apoptotic effect via phosphorylation of αβ-Crystallin or induction of Pim-3 during early response to oxidative stress or anoxic preconditioning respectively Both p38α MAPK and p38β MAPK appear to have an opposite role in apoptosis. Whereas p38α MAPK has a pro-apoptotic role via p53 activation, p38β MAPK has a pro-survival role via inhibition of ROS formation. In general, chronic activation of p38 MAPK activity is viewed as pathological and pro-apoptotic, and inhibition of p38 MAPK activity is in clinical evaluation as a potential therapy to mitigate acute injury in ischemic heart failure. p38 MAPK activity is also implicated in cardiac hypertrophy which is a significant feature of pathological remodeling in the diseased hearts and a major risk factor for heart failure and advert outcome. Most in vitro evidence supports that p38 MAPK activation promotes cardiomyocyte hypertrophy. However, in vivo evidence suggest that chronic activation of p38 MAPK activity triggers restrictive cardiomyopathy with limited hypertrophy, while genetic inactivation p38α MAPK in mouse heart results in an elevated cardiac hypertrophy in response to pressure overload or swimming exercise. Therefore, the functional role of p38 MAPK in cardiac hypertrophy remains controversial and yet to be further elucidated.

== Interactions ==
MAPK14 has been shown to interact with:

- AKT1,
- ATF2,
- CDC25B,
- CDC25C,
- CSNK2A1,
- DUSP10,
- DUSP16,
- DUSP1,
- FUBP1,
- HTRA2,
- KRT8
- MAP2K6,
- TAB1,
- MAPK1,
- MAPKAPK2,
- MAPKAPK3,
- MEF2A,
- RPS6KA4, and
- ZFP36L1.
