= MAPKAPK3 =

Protein-coding gene in the species Homo sapiens

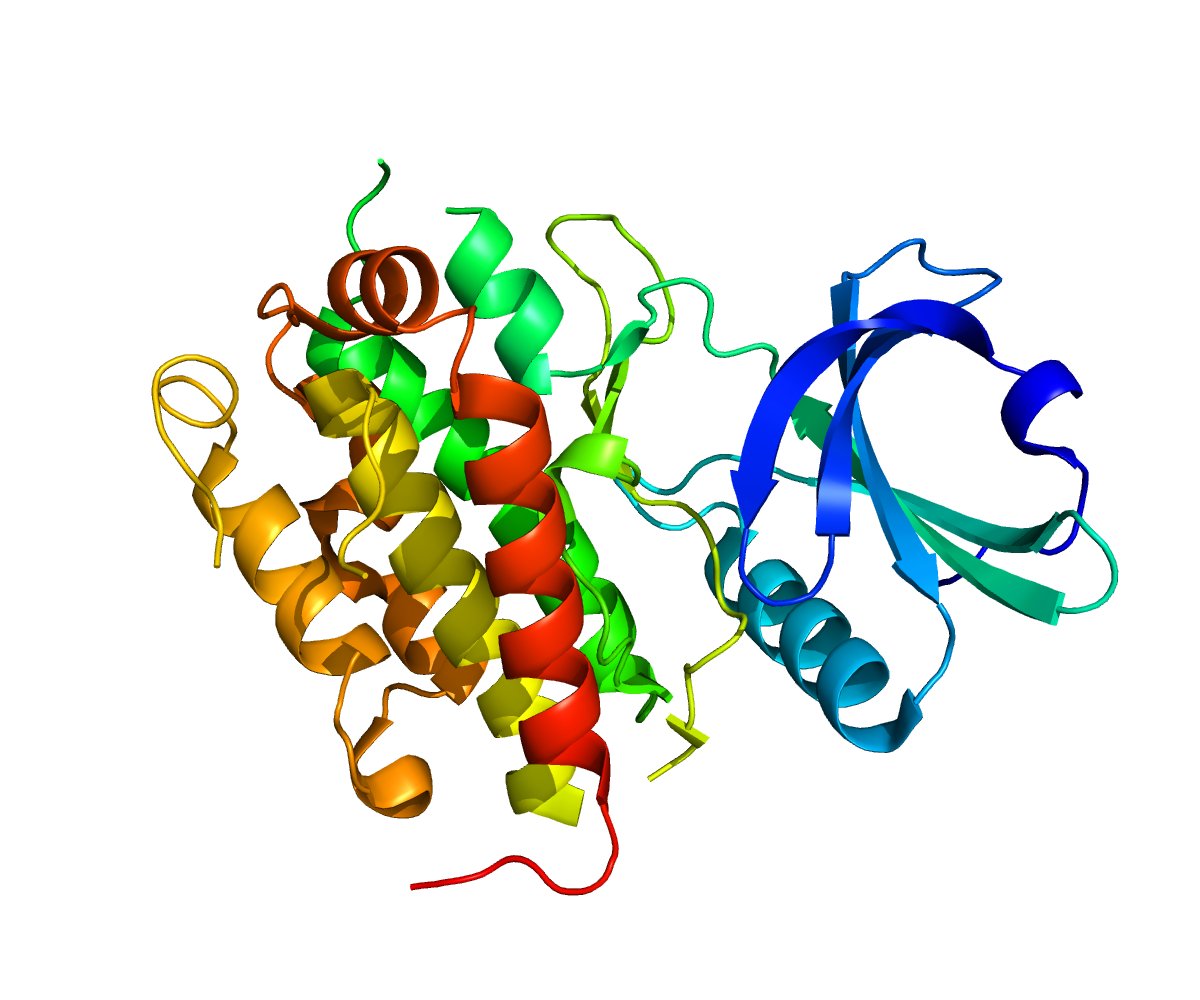

Identifiers
- Aliases: MAPKAPK3, 3PK, MAPKAP-K3, MAPKAP3, MAPKAPK-3, MK-3, mitogen-activated protein kinase-activated protein kinase 3, MDPT3, MAPK activated protein kinase 3, MK3
- External IDs: OMIM: 602130; MGI: 2143163; GeneCards: MAPKAPK3
Available structures
PDB	Ortholog search: PDBe RCSB
PDB	List of PDB id codes 3FHR, 3FXW, 3R1N, 3SHE
Enzyme activity
EC #	BRENDA	ExPASy	KEGG	MetaCyc
2.7.11.1	↗	↗	↗	↗

Gene location (Human)
Chr.	Chromosome 3 (human)
Band	3p21.2	Start	50,611,520 bp
Band	3p21.2	End	50,649,291 bp

Gene location (Mouse)
Chr.	Chromosome 9 (mouse)
Band	9|9 F1	Start	107,132,126 bp
Band	9|9 F1	End	107,167,076 bp
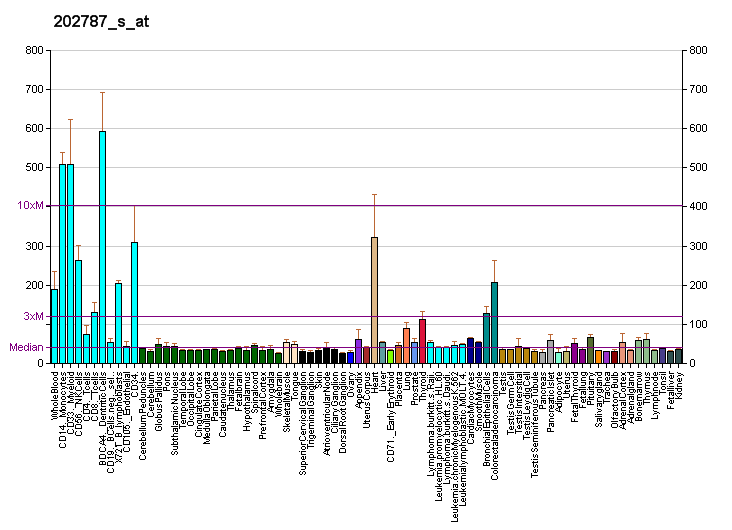

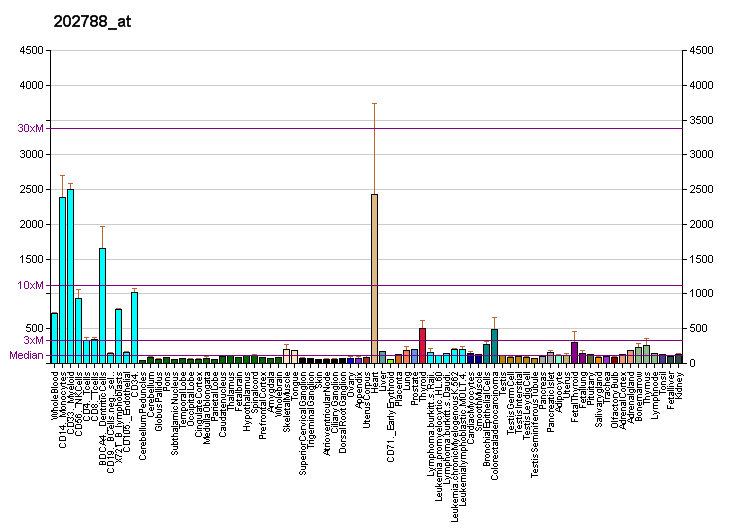
RNA expression pattern
Bgee	Human / Mouse (ortholog); Top expressed in: apex of heart; left ventricle; body of tongue; gastrocnemius muscle; myocardium of left ventricle; monocyte; right auricle of heart; right ventricle; granulocyte; tibialis anterior muscle / Top expressed in: hair follicle; granulocyte; conjunctival fornix; lip; skin of external ear; Paneth cell; semi-lunar valve; temporal muscle; esophagus; aortic valve; More reference expression data
BioGPS	More reference expression data
Gene ontology
Molecular function	transferase activity; nucleotide binding; protein kinase activity; calcium-dependent protein serine/threonine kinase activity; calmodulin binding; kinase activity; protein binding; calmodulin-dependent protein kinase activity; ATP binding; MAP kinase kinase activity; protein serine/threonine kinase activity; mitogen-activated protein kinase binding
Cellular component	cytoplasm; cytosol; nucleoplasm; nucleus
Biological process	response to cytokine; phosphorylation; protein phosphorylation; cell surface receptor signaling pathway; response to lipopolysaccharide; vascular endothelial growth factor receptor signaling pathway; macropinocytosis; peptidyl-serine phosphorylation; protein autophosphorylation; signal transduction; toll-like receptor signaling pathway; MAPK cascade; intracellular signal transduction
Sources:Amigo / QuickGO
Orthologs
Databases	NCBI: entry; OMA: entry
Species	Human	Mouse
Entrez	7867	102626
Ensembl	ENSG00000114738	ENSMUSG00000032577
UniProt	Q16644	Q3UMW7
RefSeq (mRNA)	NM_001243925; NM_001243926; NM_004635	NM_178907; NM_001316691
RefSeq (protein)	NP_001230854; NP_001230855; NP_004626	NP_001303620; NP_849238
Location (UCSC)	Chr 3: 50.61 – 50.65 Mb	Chr 9: 107.13 – 107.17 Mb
PubMed search
- Wikidata
View/Edit Human	View/Edit Mouse

MAP kinase-activated protein kinase 3 is an enzyme that in humans is encoded by the MAPKAPK3 gene.

== Function ==
This gene encodes a member of the Ser/Thr protein kinase family. This kinase functions as a mitogen-activated protein kinase (MAP kinase)- activated protein kinase. MAP kinases are also known as extracellular signal-regulated kinases (ERKs), act as an integration point for multiple biochemical signals. This kinase was shown to be activated by growth inducers and stress stimulation of cells. In vitro studies demonstrated that ERK, p38 MAP kinase and Jun N-terminal kinase were all able to phosphorylate and activate this kinase, which suggested the role of this kinase as an integrative element of signaling in both mitogen and stress responses. This kinase was reported to interact with, phosphorylate and repress the activity of E47, which is a basic helix-loop-helix transcription factor known to be involved in the regulation of tissue-specific gene expression and cell differentiation.

== Interactions ==
MAPKAPK3 has been shown to interact with MAPK14 and TCF3.
