= TAOK2 =

Protein-coding gene in the species Homo sapiens

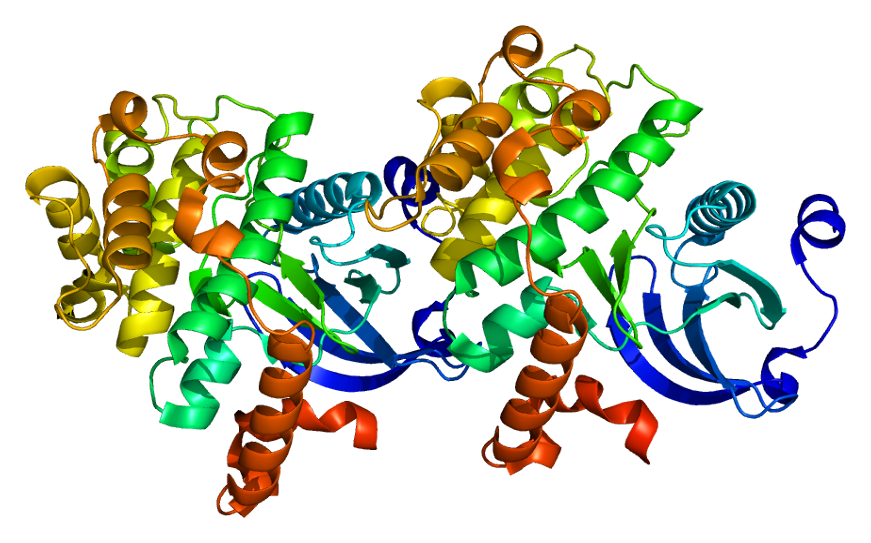

Identifiers
- Aliases: TAOK2, MAP3K17, PSK, PSK1, PSK1-BETA, TAO1, TAO2, TAO kinase 2, Tao2beta
- External IDs: OMIM: 613199; MGI: 1915919; GeneCards: TAOK2
Enzyme activity
EC #	BRENDA	ExPASy	KEGG	MetaCyc
2.7.11.1	↗	↗	↗	↗

Gene location (Human)
Chr.	Chromosome 16 (human)
Band	16p11.2	Start	29,973,868 bp
Band	16p11.2	End	29,992,261 bp

Gene location (Mouse)
Chr.	Chromosome 7 (mouse)
Band	7|7 F3	Start	126,464,850 bp
Band	7|7 F3	End	126,483,875 bp
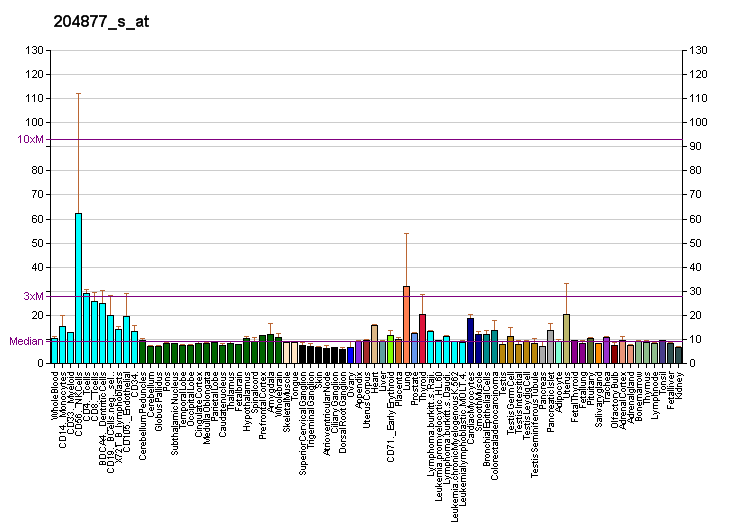

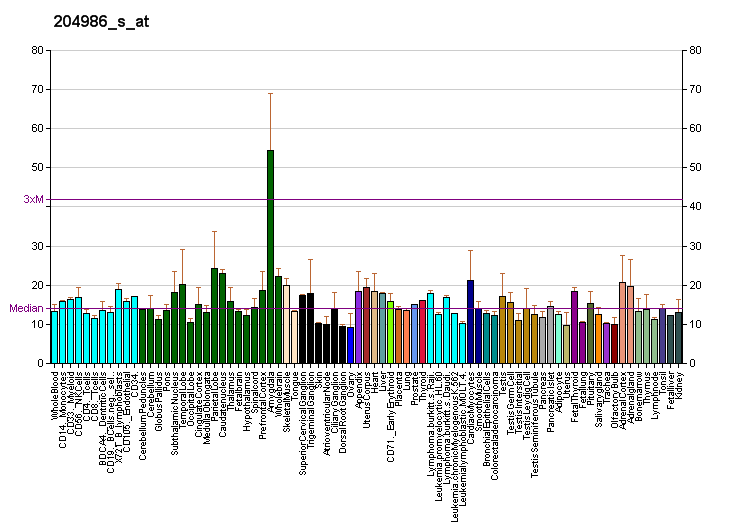

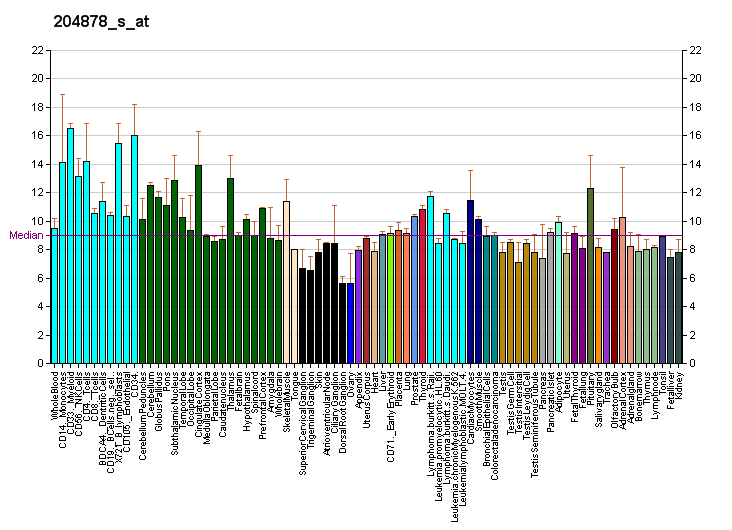
RNA expression pattern
Bgee	Human / Mouse (ortholog); Top expressed in: right hemisphere of cerebellum; apex of heart; right adrenal cortex; right lung; right frontal lobe; anterior pituitary; right testis; left testis; left adrenal cortex; upper lobe of left lung / Top expressed in: neural layer of retina; superior frontal gyrus; dentate gyrus of hippocampal formation granule cell; granulocyte; primary visual cortex; ventricular zone; lip; esophagus; yolk sac; spermatocyte; More reference expression data
BioGPS	More reference expression data
Gene ontology
Molecular function	transferase activity; nucleotide binding; protein kinase activity; kinase activity; protein serine/threonine kinase activity; mitogen-activated protein kinase kinase binding; ATP binding; MAP kinase kinase kinase activity; neuropilin binding; tau protein binding; tau-protein kinase activity
Cellular component	integral component of membrane; cell projection; membrane; receptor complex; dendrite; nucleolus; cytoskeleton; cytoplasmic vesicle membrane; nucleus; cytoplasm; cytosol; cytoplasmic vesicle; actin cytoskeleton; axon; neuron projection; dendritic growth cone; axonal growth cone
Biological process	phosphorylation; protein targeting to membrane; response to stress; positive regulation of JNK cascade; cellular response to DNA damage stimulus; protein phosphorylation; focal adhesion assembly; stress-activated MAPK cascade; regulation of cell growth; regulation of cell shape; cell migration; actin cytoskeleton organization; positive regulation of stress-activated MAPK cascade; apoptotic process; regulation of mitotic cell cycle; nervous system development; regulation of apoptotic process; mitotic G2 DNA damage checkpoint signaling; axonogenesis; signal transduction; stress-activated protein kinase signaling cascade; positive regulation of protein autophosphorylation; activation of protein kinase activity; regulation of actin cytoskeleton organization; protein autophosphorylation; basal dendrite morphogenesis; basal dendrite arborization
Sources:Amigo / QuickGO
Orthologs
Databases	NCBI: entry; OMA: entry
Species	Human	Mouse
Entrez	9344	381921
Ensembl	ENSG00000149930	ENSMUSG00000059981
UniProt	Q9UL54	Q6ZQ29
RefSeq (mRNA)	NM_001252043; NM_004783; NM_016151	NM_001163774; NM_001163775
RefSeq (protein)	NP_001238972; NP_004774; NP_057235	NP_001157246; NP_001157247
Location (UCSC)	Chr 16: 29.97 – 29.99 Mb	Chr 7: 126.46 – 126.48 Mb
PubMed search
- Wikidata
View/Edit Human	View/Edit Mouse

Serine/threonine-protein kinase TAO2 is an enzyme that in humans is encoded by the TAOK2 gene.

== Interactions ==
TAOK2 has been shown to interact with MAP2K6 and MAP2K3.
