= Pamapimod =

Investigational drug

Identifiers
- IUPAC name: 6-(2,4-difluorophenoxy)-2-(1,5-dihydroxypentan-3-ylamino)-8-methylpyrido[2,3-d]pyrimidin-7-one
- CAS Number: 449811-01-2
- PubChem CID: 16220188
- IUPHAR/BPS: 9915
- ChemSpider: 17347490
- UNII: 8S2C9V11K4
- KEGG: D08963
- ChEBI: CHEBI:90685
- ChEMBL: ChEMBL1090089
- PDB ligand: FLW (PDBe, RCSB PDB)
- CompTox Dashboard (EPA): DTXSID90963312

Chemical and physical data
- Formula: C_{19}H_{20}F_{2}N_{4}O_{4}
- Molar mass: 406.390 g·mol^{−1}
- 3D model (JSmol): Interactive image
- SMILES: CN1C2=NC(=NC=C2C=C(C1=O)OC3=C(C=C(C=C3)F)F)NC(CCO)CCO
- InChI: InChI=InChI=1S/C19H20F2N4O4/c1-25-17-11(10-22-19(24-17)23-13(4-6-26)5-7-27)8-16(18(25)28)29-15-3-2-12(20)9-14(15)21/h2-3,8-10,13,26-27H,4-7H2,1H3,(H,22,23,24); Key:JYYLVUFNAHSSFE-UHFFFAOYSA-N

Pamapimod is an investigational drug which is being evaluated for the treatment of autoimmune diseases. It is a p38 mitogen-activated protein kinase inhibitor. It has been evaluated in a phase 2 clinical trial for the treatment of rheumatoid arthritis, but was found not to be effective. It has subsequently been investigated as a possible treatment for osteoarthritis.

== See also ==
- NJK14047
- PH-797804
