= Jun dimerization protein 2 =

Protein-coding gene in the species Homo sapiens

JDP2

Identifiers
- Aliases: JDP2, JUNDM2, Jun dimerization protein 2
- External IDs: OMIM: 608657; MGI: 1932093; GeneCards: JDP2

Gene location (Human)
Chr.	Chromosome 14 (human)
Band	14q24.3	Start	75,427,716 bp
Band	14q24.3	End	75,474,111 bp

Gene location (Mouse)
Chr.	Chromosome 12 (mouse)
Band	12|12 D2	Start	85,645,801 bp
Band	12|12 D2	End	85,686,652 bp
RNA expression pattern
Bgee	Human / Mouse (ortholog); Top expressed in: synovial joint; cardiac muscle tissue of right atrium; synovial membrane; skin of arm; Achilles tendon; vena cava; sural nerve; decidua; lower lobe of lung; myocardium of left ventricle / Top expressed in: granulocyte; conjunctival fornix; stroma of bone marrow; calvaria; body of femur; cervix; cornea; fossa; right lung lobe; membranous bone; More reference expression data
BioGPS	n/a
Gene ontology
Molecular function	DNA-binding transcription factor activity; DNA binding; DNA-binding transcription repressor activity, RNA polymerase II-specific; double-stranded DNA binding; chromatin binding; protein binding; protein heterodimerization activity; RNA polymerase II cis-regulatory region sequence-specific DNA binding; DNA-binding transcription factor activity, RNA polymerase II-specific; transcription corepressor activity
Cellular component	nucleus
Biological process	positive regulation of histone deacetylation; regulation of transcription by RNA polymerase II; negative regulation of fat cell differentiation; regulation of transcription, DNA-templated; negative regulation of transcription by RNA polymerase II; regulation of histone deacetylation; transcription, DNA-templated
Sources:Amigo / QuickGO
Orthologs
Databases	NCBI: entry; OMA: entry
Species	Human	Mouse
Entrez	122953	81703
Ensembl	ENSG00000140044	ENSMUSG00000034271
UniProt	Q8WYK2	P97875
RefSeq (mRNA)	NM_001135047; NM_001135048; NM_001135049; NM_130469	NM_001205052; NM_001205053; NM_030887; NM_001401266
RefSeq (protein)	NP_001128519; NP_001128520; NP_001128521; NP_569736	NP_001191981; NP_001191982; NP_112149; NP_001388195
Location (UCSC)	Chr 14: 75.43 – 75.47 Mb	Chr 12: 85.65 – 85.69 Mb
PubMed search
- Wikidata
View/Edit Human	View/Edit Mouse

Jun dimerization protein 2 (JUNDM2) is a protein that in humans is encoded by the JDP2 gene. The Jun dimerization protein is a member of the AP-1 family of transcription factors.

JDP 2 was found by a Sos-recruitment system, to dimerize with c-Jun to repress AP-1-mediated activation. It was later identified by the yeast-two hybrid system to bind to activating transcription factor 2 (ATF2) to repress ATF-mediated transcriptional activation. JDP2 regulates 12-O-tetradecanoylphorbol-13-acetate (TPA) response element (TRE)- and cAMP-responsive element (CRE)-dependent transcription.

The JDP2 gene is located on human chromosome 14q24.3 (46.4 kb, 75,427,715 bp to 75,474,111 bp) and mouse chromosome 12 (39 kb, 85,599,105 bp to 85,639,878 bp), which is located at about 250 kbp in the Fos-JDP2-BATF locus. Alternative splicing of JDP2 generates at least two isoforms. The protein JDP2 has 163 amino acids, belongs to the family of basic leucine zipper (bZIP), and shows high homology with the ATF3 bZIP domain. The bZIP domain includes the amino acids from position 72 to 135, the basic motif from position 74 to 96, and the leucine zipper from 100 to 128. The molecular weight of the canonical JDP2 is 18,704 Da. The histone-binding region is located from position 35 to 72 and the inhibition of the histone acetyltransferase (INHAT) region is from position 35 to 135, which is located before the DNA-binding domain.

JDP2 is expressed ubiquitously but is detected mainly in the cerebellum, brain, lung, and testis. A JDP2 single nucleotide polymorphism (SNP) was detected in Japanese, Korean, and Dutch cohorts, and is associated with an increased risk of intracranial aneurysms.

== Posttranscriptional and post translational modifications ==
Phosphorylation of the threonine (Thr) residue at position 148 is mediated by c-Jun N-terminal kinase (MAPK8; JNK1) and p38 MAPK. Phosphorylated ATF2 inhibits the formation with JDP2 in vitro while phosphorylated JDP2 undergoes proteasomal degradation. It contains putative SUMO modification of lysine (Lys) residue at position 65, and recruits interferon regulatory factor 2 binding protein 1 (IRF2BP1), which acts as an E3 ligase. Phosphorylation of Thr at position 148 is detected in response to various stress conditions such as UV irradiation, oxidative stress, and anisomycin treatment or JDP2 is also regulated by other kinases such as p38 MAPK and doublecortin like protein kinase. Polyubiquitination of JDP2 protein is induced by IRF2BP1. JDP2 displays histone-binding and histone-chaperone activity. and inhibition of p300/CBP induced histone acetylation (INHAT). JDP2 recruits histone deacetylases HDAC1 and HDAC2, HDAC6 and HDAC3. JDP2 has INHAT activity and inhibits histone methylation in vitro.

== Function ==
=== Phenotypes of gene knockout and transgenic mice ===
Gene knockout mice have a shorter tail, are smaller, have low neutrophil count. and cell proliferation, and commit to cell cycle arrest because of AP-1 repression. TransgenicJDP2 mice display atrial dilation and myocardial hypertrophy.

=== Dimer formation and interacting molecules ===
JDP2 functions as a transcription activator or repressor depending on the leucine zipper protein member it is associated with. JDP2 forms a homodimer or heterodimer with c-Jun, JUNB, JUND, Fra2, ATF2. and acts as a general repressor. On the other hand, JDP2 form a stable heterodimer with CHOP10 to enhance TRE- but not CRE-dependent transcription. In addition, JDP2 has been shown to directly associate with the progesterone receptor (PR) and functionally acts as a coactivator of progesterone-dependent PR-mediated gene transcription. Other proteins such as interferon regulatory factor-2-binding protein-1 (IRF2BP1). CCAAT/enhancer-binding protein gamma (C/EBPγ), HDAC3 and HDAC6 have also been demonstrated to associate with JDP2.

=== Cell differentiation ===
JDP2 plays a role in cell differentiation in several systems. Ectopic expression of JDP2 inhibits the retinoic acid-induced differentiation of F9 cells and adipocyte differentiation. By contrast, JDP2 induces terminal muscle cell differentiation in C2 myoblasts and reduces the tumorigenicity of rhabdomyosarcoma cells and restored their ability to differentiate into myotubes. It is also reported that JDP2 plays an important role in the RANK-mediated osteoclast differentiation. Further, JDP2 is involved in neutrophil differentiation and transcription factor Tbx3-mediated osteoclastogenesis for host defense and bone homeostasis. Methylome mapping suggests that JDP2 plays a role in cell progenitor differentiation of megakaryocytes.

=== Regulation of cell cycle and p53 signaling ===
JDP2 induces cell cycle arrest through cyclin D, p53, and cyclin A transcription, by increasing JUNB, JUND, and Fra2, and by decreasing c-JUN through the loss of p27^{Kip1}. JDP2 downregulates p53 transcription, which promotes leukemogenesis. Mouse p53 protein negatively regulates the JDP2 promoter in F9 cells as part of the JDP2˗p53 autoregulatory circuit. By contrast, JDP2-knockout mice exhibit in downregulation of p53 and p21 proteins.

=== Apoptosis and senescence ===
JDP2 appears to be involved in the inhibition of apoptosis. Depletion of JDP2 induces cell death similar to apoptosis. A study also demonstrated that UV irradiation induces JDP2 expression, which in turn down-regulates expression of p53 and thereby protects cells from UV-mediated programmed cell death. Heart-specific JDP2 overexpression protects cardiomyocytes against hypertrophic growth and TGFβ–induced apoptosis. In other settings, JDP2 has been shown to play an important role in the regulation of cellular senescence. JDP2-deficient mouse embryonic fibroblasts are resistant to replicative senescence by recruiting polycomb-repressive complexes (PRC1 and PRC2) to the promoters at the p16Ink4a locus.

=== Oxidative stress and antioxidative response ===
The increased accumulation of intracellular reactive oxygen species (ROS) and 8-oxo-dGuo, one of the major products of DNA oxidation, and the reduced expression of several transcripts involved in ROS metabolism in Jdp2-deficient MEFs argue that JDP2 is required to hold ROS levels in check. Furthermore, JDP2 binds directly to the antioxidant responsive element (ARE) core sequence, associates with Nrf2 and MafK (Nrf2–MafK) via basic leucine zipper domains, and increases DNA-binding activity of the Nrf2–MafK complex to the ARE and the transcription of ARE-dependent genes such as HO1 and NQO1. Therefore, JDP2 functions as an integral component of the Nrf2–MafK complex to modulate antioxidant and detoxification programs.

== Nuclear reprogramming ==
JDP2, which has been shown to regulate Wnt signaling pathway and prevent ROS production, may play roles in cell reprogramming. Indeed, a study demonstrated that DAOY medulloblastoma cells can be reprogrammed successfully by JDP2 and the defined factor OCT4 to become induced pluripotent stem cells (iPSC)-like cells. This iPSC-like cells expressed stem cell-like characteristics including alkaline phosphatase activity and some stem cell markers, including SSEA3, SSEA4 and Tra-1-60. Later, another study also showed that JDP2 can substitute Oct4 to generate iPSCs with Klf4, Sox2 and Myc (KSM) or KS from somatic cells. Moreover, they showed that JDP2 anchors five non-Yamanaka factors (ID1, JHDM1B, LRH1, SALL4, and GLIS1) to reprogram mouse embryonic fibroblasts into iPSCs.

== Oncogene or tumor suppressor gene ==
JDP2 may act as a double-edge sword in tumorigenesis. It is reported that JDP2 inhibits Ras-dependent cell transformation in NIH3T3 cells and tumor development in xenografts transplanted into SCID mice. Constitutive expression of JDP2 in rhabdomyosarcoma cells reduced their tumorigenic characteristics. On the other hand, JDP2 induces partial oncogenic transformation of chicken embryonic fibroblasts. Studies using high throughput viral insertional mutagenesis analysis also revealed that JDP2 functions as an oncogene. JDP2-transgenic mice display potentiation of liver cancer, higher mortality and increase number and size of tumors, especially when JDP2 expression is at the promotion stage.

== Cancer and disease markers ==
JDP2 shows the gene amplification of head and neck squamous-cell carcinoma. In pancreatic carcinoma, downregulation of JDP2 is correlated with lymph node metastasis and distant metastasis and strongly associated with the post-surgery survival time, indicating that JDP2 may serve as a biomarker to predict the prognosis of patients with pancreatic cancer. In addition, JDP2 overexpression reverses the epithelial-to-mesenchymal transition (EMT) induced by co-treatment with TGF-β1 and EGF in human pancreatic BxPC-3 cells, suggesting that JDP2 may be a molecular target for pancreatic carcinoma intervention. Furthermore, it has been shown that the expression level of JDP2 gene upon acute myocardial infarction (AMI) is highly specific and a sensitive biomarker for predicting heart failure. In T cell acute lymphoblastic leukaemia, JDP2 regulates pro-survival signalling through direct transcriptional regulation of MCL1 and leads to steroid resistance in vivo.

== JDP2 targets and JDP2-regulated genes ==
JDP2 is involved in the modulation of gene expression. For example, JDP2 regulates MyoD gene expression with c-Jun and gene for galectin-7. JDP2 functionally associated with HDAC3 and acts as a repressor to inhibit the amino acid regulation of CHOP transcription. JDP2 and ATF3 are involved in recruiting HDACs to the ATF3 promoter region resulting in transcriptional repression of ATF3. JDP2 inhibits the promoter of the Epstein–Barr virus (EBV) immediate early gene BZLF1 for the regulation of the latent-lytic switch in EBV infection.

== Interactions ==
JDP2 (gene) has been shown to interact with Activating transcription factor 2.
