= MAP2K6 =

Protein-coding gene in the species Homo sapiens

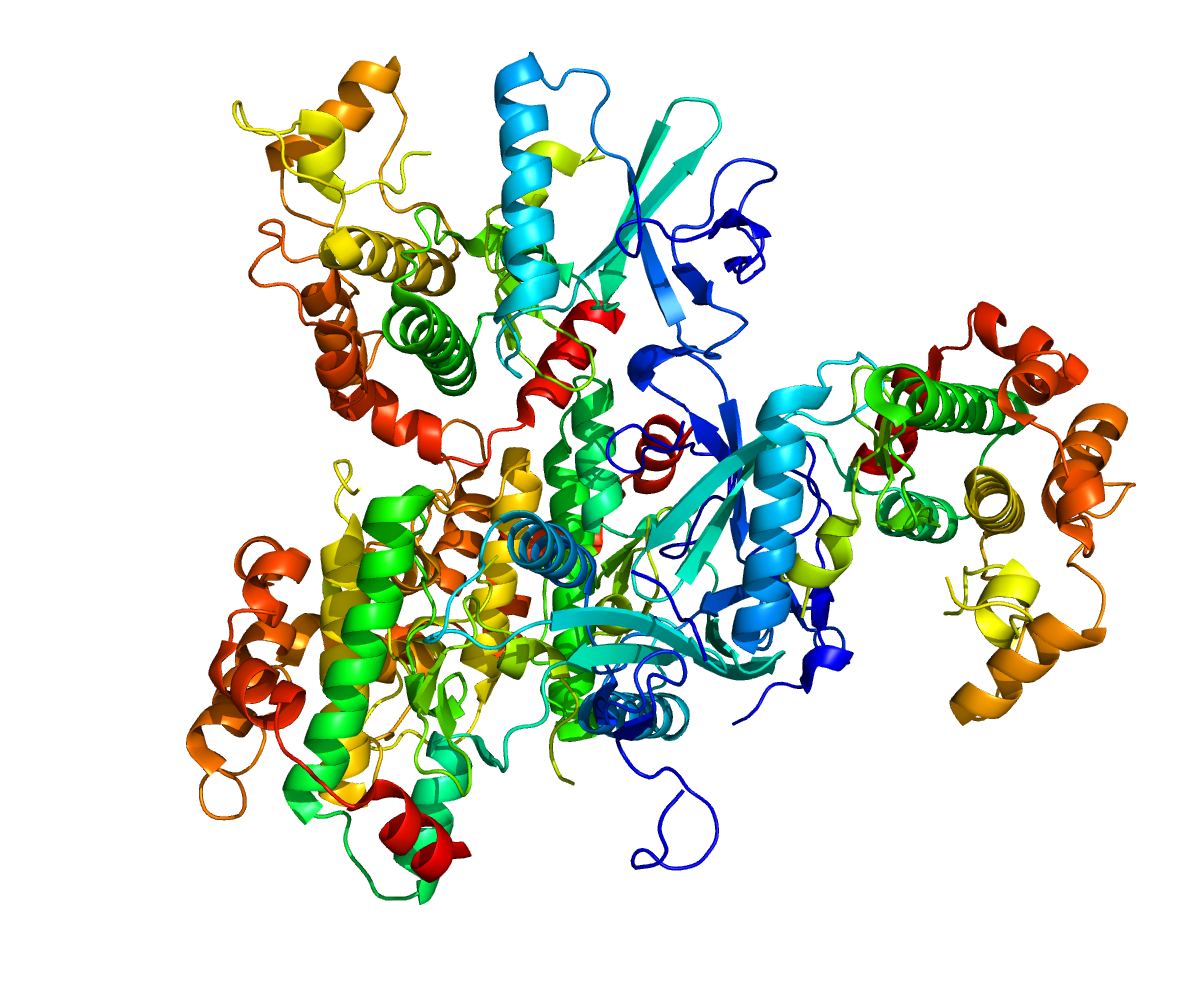

Identifiers
- Aliases: MAP2K6, MAPKK6, MEK6, MKK6, PRKMK6, SAPKK-3, SAPKK3, mitogen-activated protein kinase kinase 6
- External IDs: OMIM: 601254; MGI: 1346870; GeneCards: MAP2K6
Available structures
PDB	Ortholog search: PDBe RCSB
PDB	List of PDB id codes 2Y8O, 3ENM, 3FME, 3VN9
Enzyme activity
EC #	BRENDA	ExPASy	KEGG	MetaCyc
2.7.12.2	↗	↗	↗	↗

Gene location (Human)
Chr.	Chromosome 17 (human)
Band	17q24.3	Start	69,414,697 bp
Band	17q24.3	End	69,553,865 bp

Gene location (Mouse)
Chr.	Chromosome 11 (mouse)
Band	11|11 E1-E2	Start	110,399,122 bp
Band	11|11 E1-E2	End	110,525,522 bp
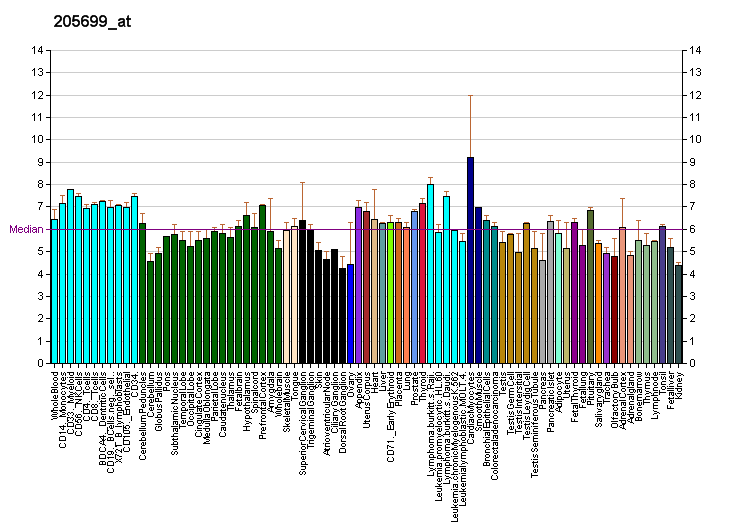

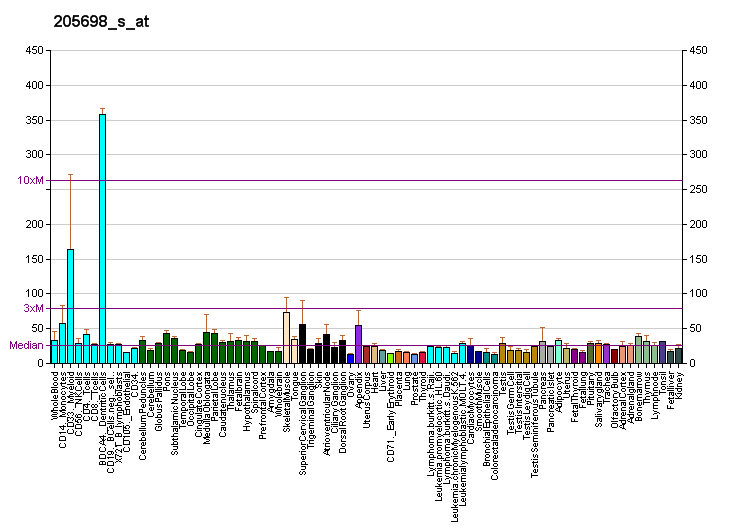
RNA expression pattern
Bgee	Human / Mouse (ortholog); Top expressed in: rectum; mucosa of transverse colon; biceps brachii; vastus lateralis muscle; Skeletal muscle tissue of biceps brachii; gastrocnemius muscle; triceps brachii muscle; deltoid muscle; Skeletal muscle tissue of rectus abdominis; muscle of thigh / Top expressed in: triceps brachii muscle; temporal muscle; muscle of thigh; sternocleidomastoid muscle; maxillary prominence; somite; mandibular prominence; vastus lateralis muscle; tail of embryo; gastrocnemius muscle; More reference expression data
BioGPS	More reference expression data
Gene ontology
Molecular function	transferase activity; nucleotide binding; protein kinase activity; kinase activity; protein binding; protein tyrosine kinase activity; ATP binding; protein kinase binding; protein serine/threonine kinase activity; identical protein binding; MAP kinase kinase activity
Cellular component	cytoplasm; nucleoplasm; cytoskeleton; nucleus; cytosol
Biological process	positive regulation of protein phosphorylation; regulation of transcription, DNA-templated; cardiac muscle contraction; phosphorylation; cellular response to sorbitol; positive regulation of nitric-oxide synthase biosynthetic process; ovulation cycle process; transcription, DNA-templated; MAPK cascade; protein phosphorylation; positive regulation of prostaglandin secretion; response to ischemia; DNA damage induced protein phosphorylation; positive regulation of apoptotic process; peptidyl-tyrosine phosphorylation; nucleotide-binding oligomerization domain containing signaling pathway; signal transduction; apoptotic process; regulation of mitotic cell cycle; stress-activated protein kinase signaling cascade; activation of protein kinase activity; regulation of apoptotic process; negative regulation of cold-induced thermogenesis
Sources:Amigo / QuickGO
Orthologs
Databases	NCBI: entry; OMA: entry
Species	Human	Mouse
Entrez	5608	26399
Ensembl	ENSG00000108984	ENSMUSG00000020623
UniProt	P52564	P70236
RefSeq (mRNA)	NM_002758; NM_031988; NM_001330450	NM_011943
RefSeq (protein)	NP_001317379; NP_002749	NP_036073; NP_001343274; NP_001343275; NP_001343276; NP_001343281 NP_001343282
Location (UCSC)	Chr 17: 69.41 – 69.55 Mb	Chr 11: 110.4 – 110.53 Mb
PubMed search
- Wikidata
View/Edit Human	View/Edit Mouse

Dual specificity mitogen-activated protein kinase kinase 6 also known as MAP kinase kinase 6 (MAPKK 6) or MAPK/ERK kinase 6 is an enzyme that in humans is encoded by the MAP2K6 gene, on chromosome 17.

== Function ==
MAPKK 6 is a member of the dual specificity protein kinase family, which functions as a mitogen-activated protein (MAP) kinase kinase. MAP kinases, also known as extracellular signal-regulated kinases (ERKs), act as an integration point for multiple biochemical signals. This protein phosphorylates and activates p38 MAP kinase in response to inflammatory cytokines or environmental stress. As an essential component of p38 MAP kinase mediated signal transduction pathway, this gene is involved in many cellular processes such as stress-induced cell cycle arrest, transcription activation and apoptosis.

== Interactions ==
MAP2K6 has been shown to interact with TAOK2, ASK1, MAPK14 and MAP3K7.
