= Otto Werner =

German physician

Carl Wilhelm Otto Werner (1 February 1879 – 5 June 1936) was a German physician, after whom Werner syndrome, a form of progeria, was named. As a medical student in 1903, Werner observed the syndrome in four siblings near the age of 30. He documented his observations in his inaugural dissertation in 1904.

Werner was born in Flensburg, the son of a provincial councillor. He attended school in Kiel and qualified to practice medicine at Christian-Albrechts-Universität zu Kiel in 1904. He served as an army doctor with the Infantry Regiment at Holstein and, in 1906, in Kiel, he married the daughter of a physician. He then began a rural medical practice based in Eddelak, a small German town near the Danish border. There, he remained for the rest of his life, except for his service as a medical officer with the German Navy during World War I. He died of liver cancer a few months after his 57th birthday.
