= MAPKAPK2 =

Protein-coding gene in humans

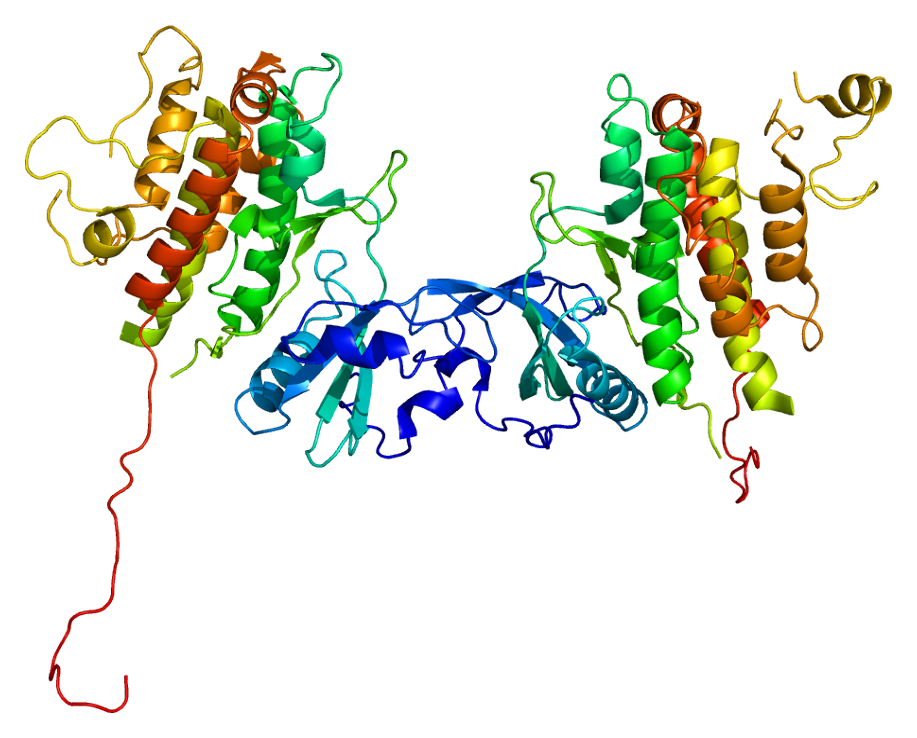

Identifiers
- Aliases: MAPKAPK2, MAPKAP-K2, MK-2, MK2, mitogen-activated protein kinase-activated protein kinase 2, MAPK activated protein kinase 2
- External IDs: OMIM: 602006; MGI: 109298; GeneCards: MAPKAPK2
Available structures
PDB	Ortholog search: PDBe RCSB
PDB	List of PDB id codes 1KWP, 1NXK, 1NY3, 2JBO, 2JBP, 2OKR, 2ONL, 2OZA, 2P3G, 2PZY, 3A2C, 3FPM, 3FYJ, 3FYK, 3GOK, 3KA0, 3KC3, 3KGA, 3M2W, 3M42, 3R2B, 3R2Y, 3R30, 3WI6, 4TYH
Enzyme activity
EC #	BRENDA	ExPASy	KEGG	MetaCyc
2.7.11.1	↗	↗	↗	↗

Gene location (Human)
Chr.	Chromosome 1 (human)
Band	1q32.1	Start	206,684,905 bp
Band	1q32.1	End	206,734,281 bp

Gene location (Mouse)
Chr.	Chromosome 1 (mouse)
Band	1|1 E4	Start	130,981,437 bp
Band	1|1 E4	End	131,025,563 bp
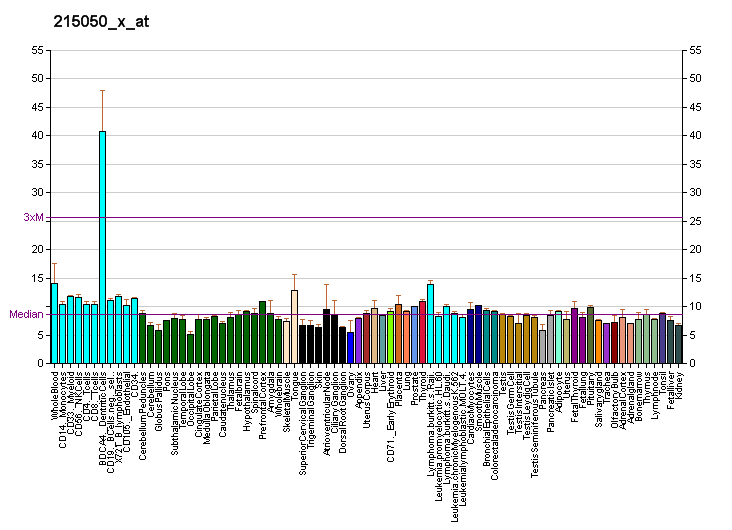

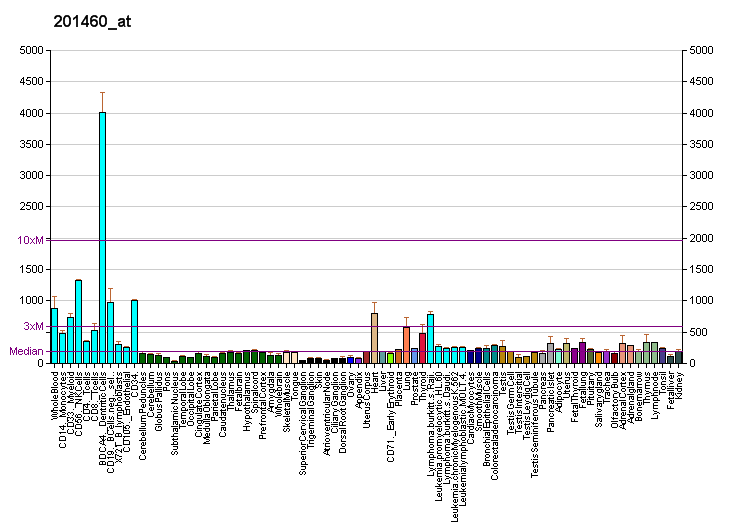

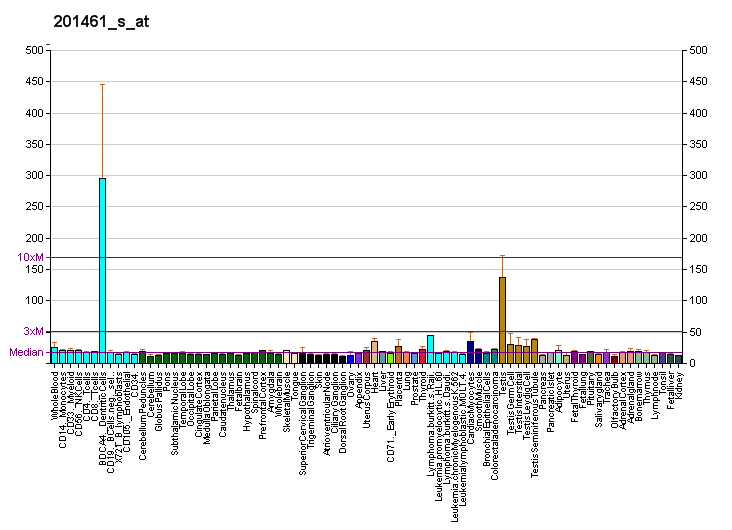
RNA expression pattern
Bgee	Human / Mouse (ortholog); Top expressed in: apex of heart; right auricle of heart; left ventricle; gastrocnemius muscle; muscle of thigh; myocardium of left ventricle; stromal cell of endometrium; upper lobe of left lung; right lung; islet of Langerhans / Top expressed in: plantaris muscle; muscle of thigh; interventricular septum; extensor digitorum longus muscle; granulocyte; soleus muscle; skeletal muscle tissue; myocardium of ventricle; thoracic diaphragm; extraocular muscle; More reference expression data
BioGPS	More reference expression data
Gene ontology
Molecular function	calmodulin-dependent protein kinase activity; signal transducer activity; nucleotide binding; transferase activity; kinase activity; calcium-dependent protein serine/threonine kinase activity; calmodulin binding; ATP binding; protein binding; protein kinase activity; protein serine/threonine kinase activity; mitogen-activated protein kinase binding
Cellular component	extracellular exosome; cytosol; centrosome; nucleoplasm; cytoplasm; nucleus
Biological process	response to stress; MAPK cascade; regulation of mRNA stability; response to cytokine; peptidyl-serine phosphorylation; cellular response to vascular endothelial growth factor stimulus; mRNA stabilization; protein autophosphorylation; 3'-UTR-mediated mRNA stabilization; cellular response to DNA damage stimulus; inner ear development; p38MAPK cascade; Ras protein signal transduction; leukotriene metabolic process; regulation of cellular response to heat; phosphorylation; protein phosphorylation; regulation of interleukin-6 production; vascular endothelial growth factor receptor signaling pathway; response to lipopolysaccharide; inflammatory response; macropinocytosis; regulation of tumor necrosis factor production; toll-like receptor signaling pathway; intracellular signal transduction
Sources:Amigo / QuickGO
Orthologs
Databases	NCBI: entry; OMA: entry
Species	Human	Mouse
Entrez	9261	17164
Ensembl	ENSG00000162889	ENSMUSG00000016528
UniProt	P49137	P49138
RefSeq (mRNA)	NM_004759; NM_032960	NM_008551
RefSeq (protein)	NP_004750; NP_116584	NP_032577
Location (UCSC)	Chr 1: 206.68 – 206.73 Mb	Chr 1: 130.98 – 131.03 Mb
PubMed search
- Wikidata
View/Edit Human	View/Edit Mouse

MAP kinase-activated protein kinase 2 is an enzyme that in humans is encoded by the MAPKAPK2 gene.

== Function ==
This gene encodes a member of the Ser/Thr protein kinase family. This kinase is regulated through direct phosphorylation by p38 MAP kinase. In conjunction with p38 MAP kinase, this kinase is known to be involved in many cellular processes including stress and inflammatory responses, nuclear export, gene expression regulation and cell proliferation. Heat shock protein HSP27 was shown to be its major direct substrate in vivo. Two transcript variants encoding two different isoforms have been found for this gene.

=== Vascular barrier ===
MK2 pathway has been demonstrated to have a key role in maintaining and repairing the integrity of endothelial barrier in the lung via actin and vimentin remodeling. Activation of MK2 via its phosphorylation by p38 has been shown to restore the vascular barrier and repair vascular leak, associated with over 60 medical conditions, including acute respiratory distress syndrome (ARDS), a major cause of death around the world.

=== SASP initiation ===
MAPKAPK2 mediates the initiation of the senescence-associated secretory phenotype (SASP) by mTOR (mechanistic target of rapamycin). Interleukin 1 alpha (IL1A) is found on the surface of senescent cells, where it contributes to the production of SASP factors due to a positive feedback loop with NF-κB. Translation of mRNA for IL1A is highly dependent upon mTOR activity. mTOR activity increases levels of IL1A, mediated by MAPKAPK2.

== See also ==
- SB 203580, suppresses the activation of MAPKAPK2
- MK2-AP directly activates MAPKAPK2 independent of p38.

== Interactions ==
MAPKAPK2 has been shown to interact with:

- AKT1,
- MAPK14,
- PHC2, and
- SHC1.
- RIPK1
