= MAP2K3 =

Protein-coding gene in the species Homo sapiens

Identifiers
- Aliases: MAP2K3, MAPKK3, MEK3, MKK3, PRKMK3, SAPKK-2, SAPKK2, mitogen-activated protein kinase kinase 3
- External IDs: OMIM: 602315; MGI: 1346868; GeneCards: MAP2K3
Available structures
PDB	Ortholog search: PDBe RCSB
PDB	List of PDB id codes 1LEZ
Enzyme activity
EC #	BRENDA	ExPASy	KEGG	MetaCyc
2.7.12.2	↗	↗	↗	↗

Gene location (Human)
Chr.	Chromosome 17 (human)
Band	17p11.2	Start	21,284,672 bp
Band	17p11.2	End	21,315,232 bp

Gene location (Mouse)
Chr.	Chromosome 11 (mouse)
Band	11|11 B2	Start	60,822,859 bp
Band	11|11 B2	End	60,843,637 bp
RNA expression pattern
Bgee	Human / Mouse (ortholog); Top expressed in: buccal mucosa cell; vena cava; blood; body of tongue; saphenous vein; mucosa of pharynx; pylorus; superior surface of tongue; cardia; monocyte / Top expressed in: temporal muscle; sternocleidomastoid muscle; ankle; digastric muscle; triceps brachii muscle; muscle of thigh; fetal liver hematopoietic progenitor cell; lip; esophagus; vastus lateralis muscle; More reference expression data
BioGPS	n/a
Gene ontology
Molecular function	ATP binding; protein tyrosine kinase activity; protein kinase activity; protein binding; kinase activity; nucleotide binding; transferase activity; MAP kinase kinase activity; protein kinase binding; protein serine/threonine kinase activity
Cellular component	nucleoplasm; cytosol; membrane; cytoplasm
Biological process	MAPK cascade; protein phosphorylation; positive regulation of transcription, DNA-templated; peptidyl-tyrosine phosphorylation; phosphorylation; signal transduction; positive regulation of protein kinase activity; inflammatory response; cardiac muscle contraction; regulation of mitotic cell cycle; stress-activated protein kinase signaling cascade; activation of protein kinase activity; regulation of apoptotic process; cellular response to vascular endothelial growth factor stimulus; p38MAPK cascade; positive regulation of blood vessel endothelial cell migration
Sources:Amigo / QuickGO
Orthologs
Databases	NCBI: entry; OMA: entry
Species	Human	Mouse
Entrez	5606	26397
Ensembl	ENSG00000034152	ENSMUSG00000018932
UniProt	P46734	O09110
RefSeq (mRNA)	NM_002756; NM_145109; NM_145110; NM_001316332	NM_008928
RefSeq (protein)	NP_001303261; NP_002747; NP_659731	NP_032954
Location (UCSC)	Chr 17: 21.28 – 21.32 Mb	Chr 11: 60.82 – 60.84 Mb
PubMed search
- Wikidata
View/Edit Human	View/Edit Mouse

Dual specificity mitogen-activated protein kinase kinase 3 is an enzyme that in humans is encoded by the MAP2K3 gene.

The protein encoded by this gene is a dual specificity protein kinase that belongs to the MAP kinase kinase family. This kinase is activated by mitogenic and environmental stress, and participates in the MAP kinase-mediated signaling cascade. It phosphorylates and thus activates MAPK14/p38-MAPK. This kinase can be activated by insulin, and is necessary for the expression of glucose transporter. Expression of RAS oncogene is found to result in the accumulation of the active form of this kinase, which thus leads to the constitutive activation of MAPK14, and confers oncogenic transformation of primary cells. The inhibition of this kinase is involved in the pathogenesis of Yersinia pseudotuberculosis. Multiple alternatively spliced transcript variants that encode distinct isoforms have been reported for this gene.

== Interactions ==
MAP2K3 has been shown to interact with TAOK2 and PLCB2.
