= SB 203580 =

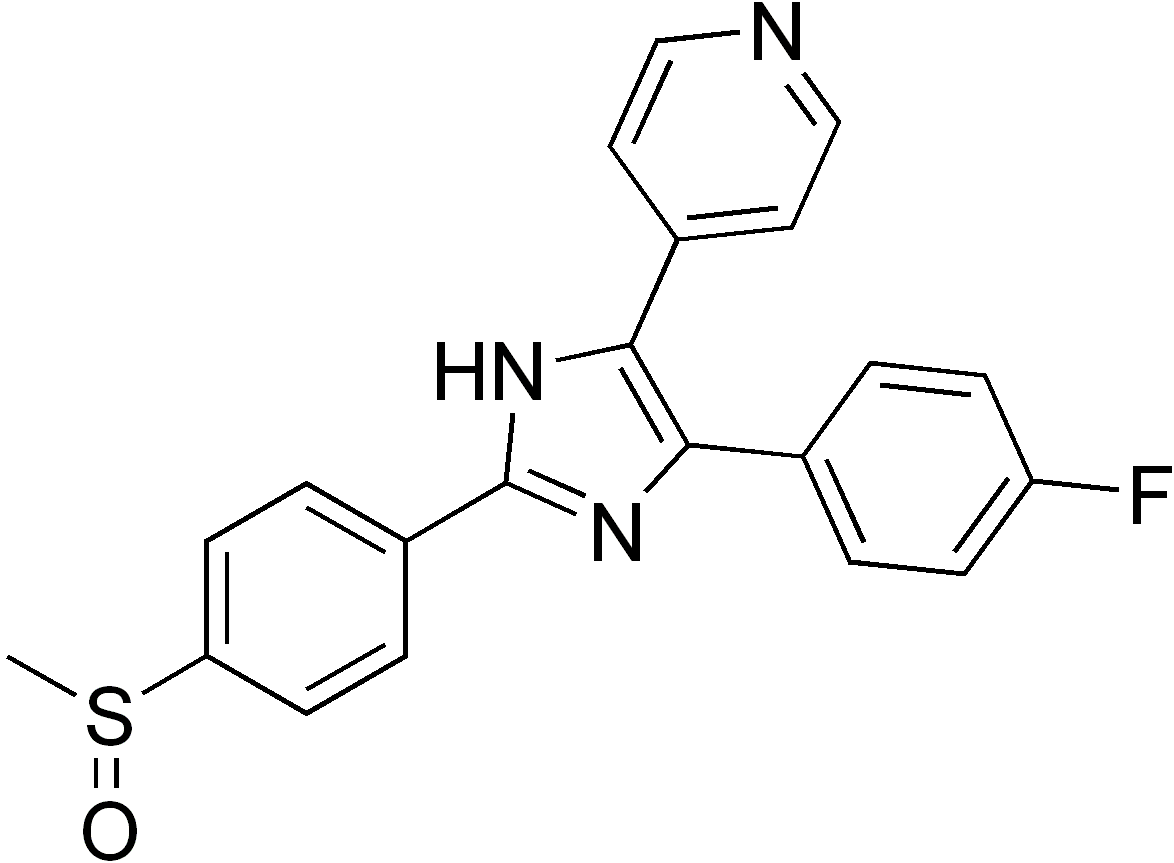

Names
- Preferred IUPAC name 4-{4-(4-Fluorophenyl)-2-[4-(methanesulfinyl)phenyl]-1H-imidazol-5-yl}pyridine
- Other names RWJ-64809;

Identifiers
CAS Number	152121-47-6
3D model (JSmol)	Interactive image
ChEBI	CHEBI:90705
ChEMBL	ChEMBL10
ChemSpider	153453
ECHA InfoCard	100.214.849
EC Number	688-252-3
IUPHAR/BPS	5269
PubChem CID	176155
UNII	OU13V1EYWQ
CompTox Dashboard (EPA)	DTXSID2040577
- InChI: InChI=1S/C21H16FN3OS/c1-27(26)18-8-4-16(5-9-18)21-24-19(14-2-6-17(22)7-3-14)20(25-21)15-10-12-23-13-11-15/h2-13H,1H3,(H,24,25) Key: CDMGBJANTYXAIV-UHFFFAOYSA-N; InChI=1/C21H16FN3OS/c1-27(26)18-8-4-16(5-9-18)21-24-19(14-2-6-17(22)7-3-14)20(25-21)15-10-12-23-13-11-15/h2-13H,1H3,(H,24,25) Key: CDMGBJANTYXAIV-UHFFFAOYAY
- SMILES: CS(=O)C1=CC=C(C=C1)C2=NC(=C(N2)C3=CC=NC=C3)C4=CC=C(C=C4)F

Properties
Chemical formula	C_{21}H_{16}FN_{3}OS
Molar mass	377.43 g/mol
Appearance	White to off-white solid
Solubility in DMSO	50 mg/mL

Hazards
- GHS labelling
Pictograms	(GHS05: Corrosive) (GHS07: Exclamation mark)
Signal word	Danger
Hazard statements	H302, H318
Precautionary statements	P264, P270, P280, P301+P312, P305+P351+P338, P310, P330, P501
- Except where otherwise noted, data are given for materials in their standard state (at 25 °C [77 °F], 100 kPa). verify (what is ?) Infobox references

SB 203580 (Adezmapimod) is a specific inhibitor of p38α and p38β which suppresses downstream activation of MAPKAP kinase-2 and heat shock protein 27. At low concentrations, it does not inhibit JNK activity. SB-203580 was recently assigned the INN Adezamapimod, and is currently in phase 2 clinical trials to prevent post-operative tissue adhesion.
