= P38 mitogen-activated protein kinases =

Protein family

mitogen-activated protein kinase 11

Identifiers
- Symbol: MAPK11
- Alt. symbols: PRKM11
- NCBI gene: 5600
- HGNC: 6873
- OMIM: 602898
- RefSeq: NM_002751
- UniProt: Q15759

Other data
- EC number: 2.7.11.24
- Locus: Chr. 22 q13.33
Search for
- Structures: Swiss-model
- Domains: InterPro

mitogen-activated protein kinase 12

Identifiers
- Symbol: MAPK12
- Alt. symbols: SAPK3
- NCBI gene: 6300
- HGNC: 6874
- OMIM: 602399
- RefSeq: NM_002969
- UniProt: P53778

Other data
- EC number: 2.7.11.24
- Locus: Chr. 22 q13.3
Search for
- Structures: Swiss-model
- Domains: InterPro

mitogen-activated protein kinase 13

Identifiers
- Symbol: MAPK13
- Alt. symbols: PRKM13
- NCBI gene: 5603
- HGNC: 6875
- OMIM: 602899
- RefSeq: NM_002754
- UniProt: O15264

Other data
- EC number: 2.7.11.24
- Locus: Chr. 6 p21
Search for
- Structures: Swiss-model
- Domains: InterPro

mitogen-activated protein kinase 14

Identifiers
- Symbol: MAPK14
- Alt. symbols: CSPB1, CSBP1, CSBP2
- NCBI gene: 1432
- HGNC: 6876
- OMIM: 600289
- RefSeq: NM_001315
- UniProt: Q16539

Other data
- EC number: 2.7.11.24
- Locus: Chr. 6 p21.3-21.2
Search for
- Structures: Swiss-model
- Domains: InterPro

p38 mitogen-activated protein kinases are a class of mitogen-activated protein kinases (MAPKs) that are responsive to stress stimuli, such as cytokines, ultraviolet irradiation, heat shock, and osmotic shock, and are involved in cell differentiation, apoptosis and autophagy. Persistent activation of the p38 MAPK pathway in muscle satellite cells (muscle stem cells) due to ageing, impairs muscle regeneration.

p38 MAP kinase (MAPK), also called RK or CSBP (Cytokinin Specific Binding Protein), is the mammalian orthologue of the yeast Hog1p MAP kinase, which participates in a signaling cascade controlling cellular responses to cytokines and stress.

Four p38 MAP kinases, p38-α (MAPK14), -β (MAPK11), -γ (MAPK12 / ERK6), and -δ (MAPK13 / SAPK4), have been identified. Similar to the SAPK/JNK pathway, p38 MAP kinase is activated by a variety of cellular stresses including osmotic shock, inflammatory cytokines, lipopolysaccharides (LPS), ultraviolet light, and growth factors.

MKK3 and SEK activate p38 MAP kinase by phosphorylation at Thr-180 and Tyr-182. Activated p38 MAP kinase has been shown to phosphorylate and activate MAPKAP kinase 2 and to phosphorylate the transcription factors ATF2, Mac, MEF2, and p53. p38 also has been shown to phosphorylate post-transcriptional regulating factors like TTP, and in fruit flies it plays a role in regulating the circadian clock.

== Clinical significance ==
Oxidative stress is the most powerfully specific stress activating p38 MAPK. Abnormal activity (higher or lower than physiological) of p38 has been implicated in pathological stresses in several tissues, that include neuronal, bone, lung, cardiac and skeletal muscle, red blood cells, and fetal tissues. The protein product of proto-oncogene RAS can increase activity of p38, and thereby cause excessively high activity of transcription factor NF-κB. This transcription factor is normally regulated from intracellular pathways that integrate signals from the surrounding tissue and the immune system. In turn these signals coordinate between cell survival and cell death. Dysregulated NF-κB activity can activate genes that cause cancer cell survival, and can also activate genes that facilitate cancer cell metastasis to other tissues. P38 was also shown to correlate with outcome of glioblastoma - higher pathway activity is associated with low survival.

== Inhibitors ==
p38 inhibitors are being sought for possible therapeutic effect on autoimmune diseases and inflammatory processes, e.g. pamapimod. Some have started clinical trials, e.g. PH-797804 for COPD. Other p38 inhibitors include BIRB 796, VX-702, SB239063, SB202190, SB203580, SCIO 469, and BMS 582949.

As of 2020, losmapimod, a p38 inhibitor, is being investigated for the treatment of facioscapulohumeral muscular dystrophy (FSHD) on the basis of p38 inhibition inhibiting the effects of DUX4.
