= Activating transcription factor 2 =

Protein found in humans

ATF2
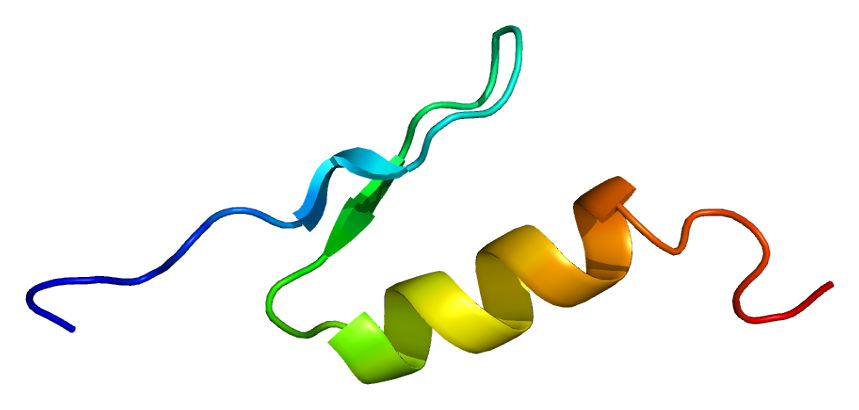

Identifiers
- Aliases: ATF2, CRE-BP1, CREB-2, CREB2, HB16, TREB7, activating transcription factor 2
- External IDs: OMIM: 123811; MGI: 109349; GeneCards: ATF2
Available structures
PDB	Ortholog search: PDBe RCSB
PDB	List of PDB id codes 1BHI, 1T2K, 4H36

Gene location (Human)
Chr.	Chromosome 2 (human)
Band	2q31.1	Start	175,072,250 bp
Band	2q31.1	End	175,168,382 bp

Gene location (Mouse)
Chr.	Chromosome 2 (mouse)
Band	2|2 C3	Start	73,816,509 bp
Band	2|2 C3	End	73,892,639 bp
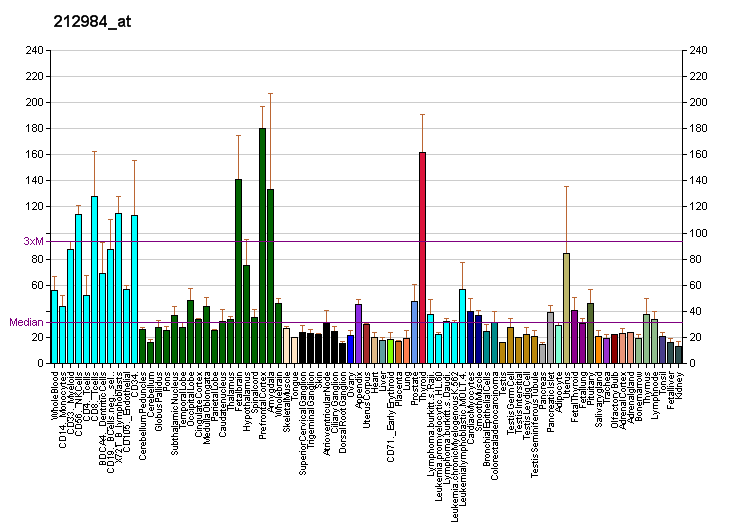

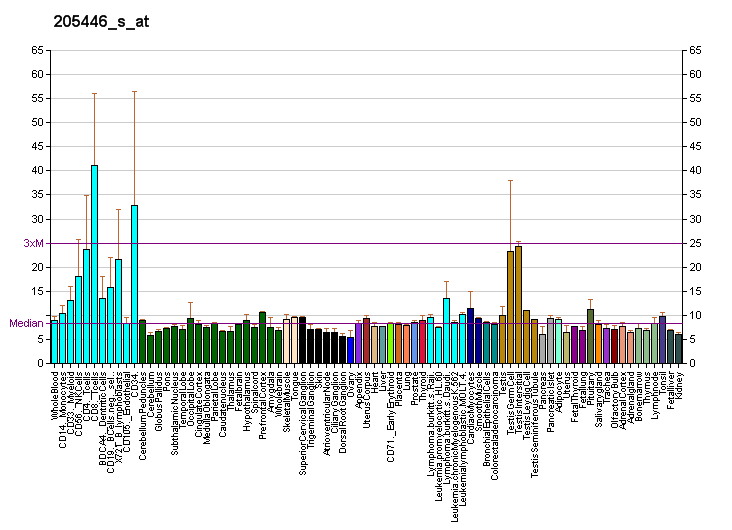
RNA expression pattern
Bgee	Human / Mouse (ortholog); Top expressed in: endothelial cell; germinal epithelium; Brodmann area 23; corpus epididymis; caput epididymis; mucosa of paranasal sinus; pars compacta; tail of epididymis; ganglionic eminence; Epithelium of choroid plexus / Top expressed in: paraventricular nucleus of hypothalamus; medial dorsal nucleus; dorsomedial hypothalamic nucleus; habenula; arcuate nucleus; ventral tegmental area; olfactory tubercle; lateral septal nucleus; anterior amygdaloid area; subiculum; More reference expression data
BioGPS	More reference expression data
Gene ontology
Molecular function	transferase activity; RNA polymerase II cis-regulatory region sequence-specific DNA binding; DNA binding; sequence-specific DNA binding; RNA polymerase II transcription regulatory region sequence-specific DNA binding; cAMP response element binding protein binding; DNA-binding transcription factor activity; DNA-binding transcription activator activity, RNA polymerase II-specific; transcription coactivator activity; chromatin binding; metal ion binding; protein binding; cis-regulatory region sequence-specific DNA binding; nucleic acid binding; transcription factor activity, RNA polymerase II distal enhancer sequence-specific binding; protein kinase binding; cAMP response element binding; histone acetyltransferase activity; DNA-binding transcription factor activity, RNA polymerase II-specific; transcription factor binding; protein heterodimerization activity
Cellular component	cytoplasm; membrane; nucleoplasm; mitochondrial outer membrane; mitochondrion; nucleus; site of double-strand break
Biological process	regulation of transcription, DNA-templated; regulation of transcription by RNA polymerase II; mitotic intra-S DNA damage checkpoint signaling; outflow tract morphogenesis; response to water deprivation; positive regulation of DNA-binding transcription factor activity; negative regulation of transcription by RNA polymerase II; transcription by RNA polymerase II; positive regulation of transforming growth factor beta2 production; transcription, DNA-templated; cellular response to DNA damage stimulus; response to osmotic stress; positive regulation of neuron apoptotic process; regulation of DNA-binding transcription factor activity; positive regulation of mitochondrial membrane permeability involved in apoptotic process; negative regulation of epithelial cell proliferation; adipose tissue development; fat cell differentiation; positive regulation of transcription by RNA polymerase II; amelogenesis; histone acetylation; positive regulation of cardiac muscle myoblast proliferation; positive regulation of gene expression; negative regulation of angiogenesis
Sources:Amigo / QuickGO
Orthologs
Databases	NCBI: entry; OMA: entry
Species	Human	Mouse
Entrez	1386	11909
Ensembl	ENSG00000115966	ENSMUSG00000027104
UniProt	P15336	P16951
RefSeq (mRNA)	NM_001256090; NM_001256091; NM_001256092; NM_001256093; NM_001256094 NM_001880	NM_001025093; NM_001284369; NM_001284370; NM_001284371; NM_001284372 NM_001284373; NM_001284374; NM_001284376; NM_009715
RefSeq (protein)	NP_001243019; NP_001243020; NP_001243021; NP_001243022; NP_001243023 NP_001871	NP_001020264; NP_001271298; NP_001271299; NP_001271300; NP_001271301 NP_001271302; NP_001271303; NP_001271305; NP_033845
Location (UCSC)	Chr 2: 175.07 – 175.17 Mb	Chr 2: 73.82 – 73.89 Mb
PubMed search
- Wikidata
View/Edit Human	View/Edit Mouse

Activating transcription factor 2, also known as ATF2, is a protein that, in humans, is encoded by the ATF2 gene.

== Function ==
This gene encodes a transcription factor that is a member of the leucine zipper family of DNA-binding proteins. This protein binds to the cAMP-responsive element (CRE), an octameric palindrome. The protein forms a homodimer or heterodimer with c-Jun. The protein is also a histone acetyltransferase (HAT) that specifically acetylates histones H2B and H4 in vitro; thus, it may represent a class of sequence-specific factors that activate transcription by direct effects on chromatin components. Additional transcript variants have been identified but their biological validity has not been determined.

The gene atf2 is located at human chromosome 2q32. The protein ATF-2 has 505 amino acids. Studies in mice indicate a role for ATF-2 in the development of nervous system and the skeleton. ATF-2 is normally activated in response to signals that converge on stress-activated protein kinases p38 and JNK. ATF-2 phosphorylation in response to treatment of cells with tumor promoter phorbol ester has been demonstrated.

Several studies implicate abnormal activation of ATF-2 in growth and progression of mammalian skin tumors. ATF-2 may mediate oncogenesis caused by mutant Ras protein and regulate maintenance of the aggressive cancer phenotype of some types of epithelial cells.

ATF2 has also been shown to be phosphorylated at its C-terminal (serine 472 and 480 in mouse; serine 490 and 498 in human) by ATM upon double-stranded breaks. Mice with mutations of these two serines are sensitive to irradiation and easier to tumorigenesis under p53 knockout background.

== Interactions ==
Activating transcription factor 2 has been shown to interact with:

- C-jun,
- Casein kinase 2, alpha 1,
- CREB binding protein,
- CSNK2A2,
- JDP2,
- MAPK14,
- MAPK8,
- Mothers against decapentaplegic homolog 3,
- NCOA6,
- RUVBL2,
- UBE2I.

== See also ==
- Activating transcription factor
