= MAPK12 =

Protein-coding gene in the species Homo sapiens

Identifiers
- Aliases: MAPK12, ERK3, ERK6, P38GAMMA, PRKM12, SAPK-3, SAPK3, ERK-6, MAPK 12, mitogen-activated protein kinase 12
- External IDs: OMIM: 602399; MGI: 1353438; GeneCards: MAPK12
Available structures
| PDB | Ortholog search: PDBe RCSB |
| PDB | List of PDB id codes 1CM8, 4QUM |
Enzyme activity
| EC # | BRENDA | ExPASy | KEGG | MetaCyc |
|---|---|---|---|---|
| 2.7.11.24 | ↗ | ↗ | ↗ | ↗ |

Gene location (Human)
| Chr. | Chromosome 22 (human) |
| Band | 22q13.33 | Start | 50,245,450 bp |
| Band | 22q13.33 | End | 50,261,716 bp |

Gene location (Mouse)
| Chr. | Chromosome 15 (mouse) |
| Band | 15|15 E3 | Start | 89,014,787 bp |
| Band | 15|15 E3 | End | 89,024,906 bp |
RNA expression pattern
| Bgee | Human / Mouse (ortholog); Top expressed in: gastrocnemius muscle; muscle of thigh; triceps brachii muscle; vastus lateralis muscle; Skeletal muscle tissue of rectus abdominis; thoracic diaphragm; right hemisphere of cerebellum; anterior pituitary; glutes; biceps brachii / Top expressed in: muscle of thigh; triceps brachii muscle; temporal muscle; ankle; tibialis anterior muscle; vastus lateralis muscle; digastric muscle; sternocleidomastoid muscle; gastrocnemius muscle; medial head of gastrocnemius muscle; More reference expression data |
| BioGPS | n/a |
Gene ontology
| Molecular function | transferase activity; protein kinase activity; nucleotide binding; metal ion binding; kinase activity; protein binding; ATP binding; magnesium ion binding; protein serine/threonine kinase activity; MAP kinase activity |
| Cellular component | cytosol; mitochondrion; nucleoplasm; nucleus; cytoplasm |
| Biological process | regulation of transcription, DNA-templated; phosphorylation; positive regulation of muscle cell differentiation; muscle organ development; negative regulation of cell cycle; transcription, DNA-templated; positive regulation of peptidase activity; protein phosphorylation; peptidyl-serine phosphorylation; DNA damage induced protein phosphorylation; cell cycle; myoblast differentiation; signal transduction; MAPK cascade; regulation of gene expression; intracellular signal transduction; cellular response to organic substance |
Sources:Amigo / QuickGO
Orthologs
| Databases | NCBI: entry; OMA: entry |
| Species | Human | Mouse |
| Entrez | 6300 | 29857 |
| Ensembl | ENSG00000188130 | ENSMUSG00000022610 |
| UniProt | P53778 | O08911 |
| RefSeq (mRNA) | NM_002969; NM_001303252 | NM_013871 |
| RefSeq (protein) | NP_001290181; NP_002960 | NP_038899; NP_001389948; NP_001389949; NP_001389950; NP_001389951 |
| Location (UCSC) | Chr 22: 50.25 – 50.26 Mb | Chr 15: 89.01 – 89.02 Mb |
| PubMed search |
- Wikidata
| View/Edit Human | View/Edit Mouse |

Mitogen-activated protein kinase 12 (MAP kinase 12), also known as extracellular signal-regulated kinase 6 (ERK6) or stress-activated protein kinase 3 (SAPK3), is an enzyme that in humans is encoded by the MAPK12 gene.

== Function ==
Activation of members of the mitogen-activated protein kinase family is a major mechanism for transduction of extracellular signals. Stress-activated protein kinases are one subclass of MAP kinases. The protein encoded by this gene functions as a signal transducer during differentiation of myoblasts to myotubes.
