= T-5224 =

Clinical data
- Other names: T5224; R-7277; R7277; T-5226; T5226
- Routes of administration: Oral
- Drug class: Transcription factor AP-1 inhibitor
- ATC code: None

Identifiers
- IUPAC name: 3-[5-(4-cyclopentyloxy-2-hydroxybenzoyl)-2-[(3-oxo-1,2-benzoxazol-6-yl)methoxy]phenyl]propanoic acid
- CAS Number: 530141-72-1
- PubChem CID: 23626877
- DrugBank: DB05998
- ChemSpider: 25069717
- UNII: 3Z4EGU4HKZ
- ChEMBL: ChEMBL3222137

Chemical and physical data
- Formula: C_{29}H_{27}NO_{8}
- Molar mass: 517.534 g·mol^{−1}
- 3D model (JSmol): Interactive image
- SMILES: C1CCC(C1)OC2=CC(=C(C=C2)C(=O)C3=CC(=C(C=C3)OCC4=CC5=C(C=C4)C(=O)NO5)CCC(=O)O)O
- InChI: InChI=1S/C29H27NO8/c31-24-15-21(37-20-3-1-2-4-20)8-10-22(24)28(34)19-6-11-25(18(14-19)7-12-27(32)33)36-16-17-5-9-23-26(13-17)38-30-29(23)35/h5-6,8-11,13-15,20,31H,1-4,7,12,16H2,(H,30,35)(H,32,33); Key:DALCQQSLNPLQFZ-UHFFFAOYSA-N

T-5224 is a small-molecule c-Fos/activator protein 1 (AP-1) inhibitor which was under development for the treatment of rheumatoid arthritis but was never marketed. It is taken orally. The drug was under development by Toyama Chemical. It reached phase 2 clinical trials prior to the discontinuation of its development.

T-5224 has been found to selectively inhibit FOS-containing AP-1 complexes. An analogous kind of approach might be useful for targeting a subset of ΔFosB-associated complexes to treat conditions like addiction. The activity of T-5224 itself against ΔFosB is unknown.
