= JunD =

Protein-coding gene in the species Homo sapiens

JUND
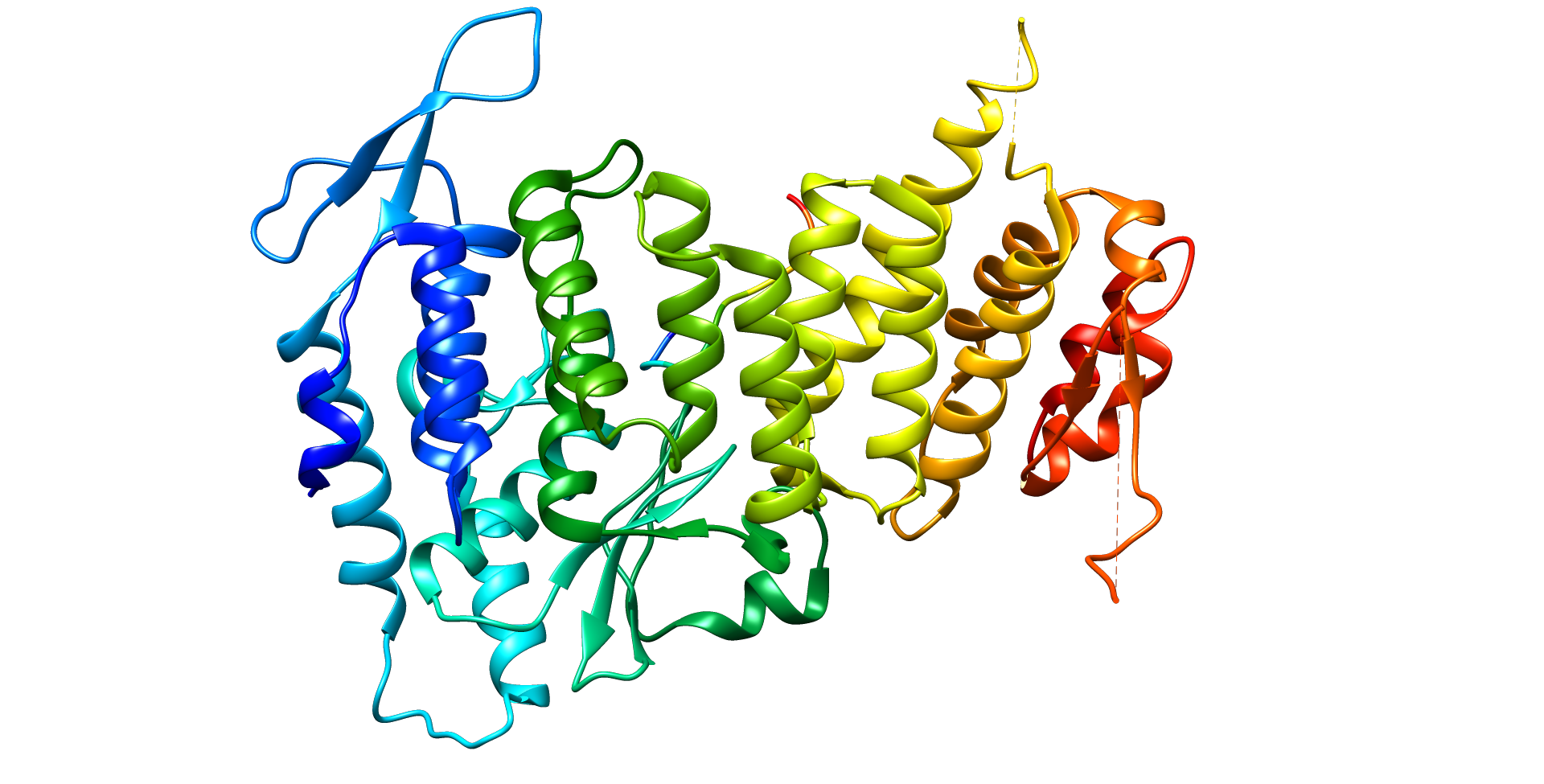

Identifiers
- Aliases: JUND, AP-1, JunD, JunD proto-oncogene, AP-1 transcription factor subunit
- External IDs: OMIM: 165162; MGI: 96648; GeneCards: JUND
Available structures
PDB	Ortholog search: PDBe RCSB
PDB	List of PDB id codes 3U86

Gene location (Human)
Chr.	Chromosome 19 (human)
Band	19p13.11	Start	18,279,694 bp
Band	19p13.11	End	18,281,622 bp

Gene location (Mouse)
Chr.	Chromosome 8 (mouse)
Band	8 B3.3|8 34.15 cM	Start	71,151,599 bp
Band	8 B3.3|8 34.15 cM	End	71,153,265 bp
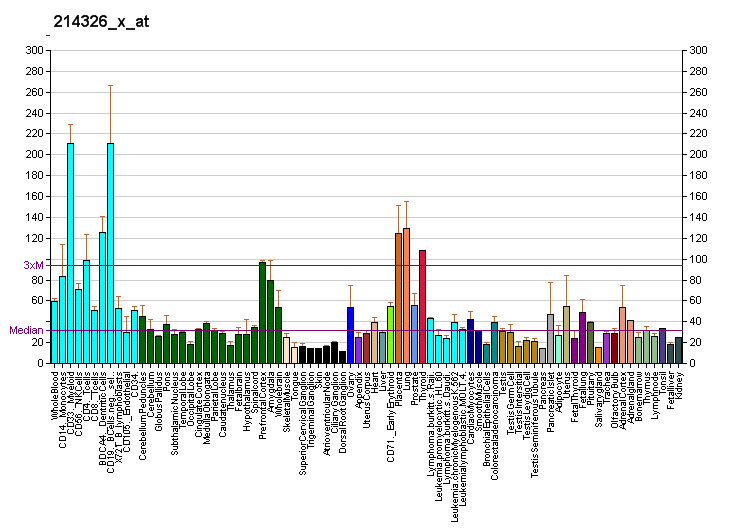

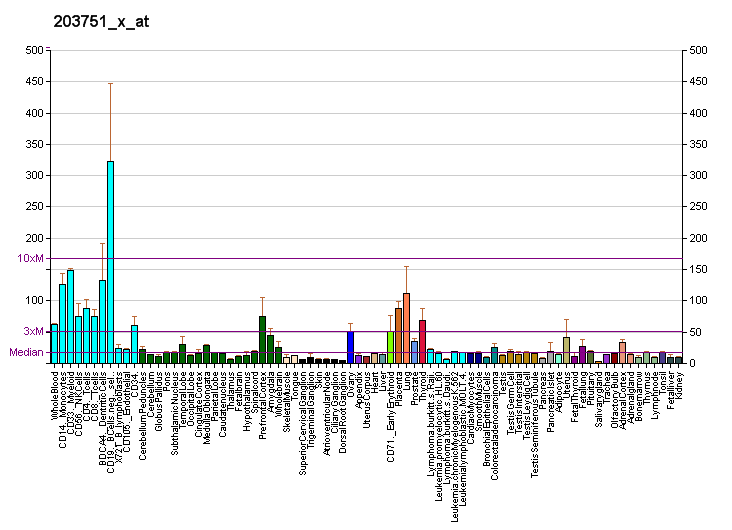

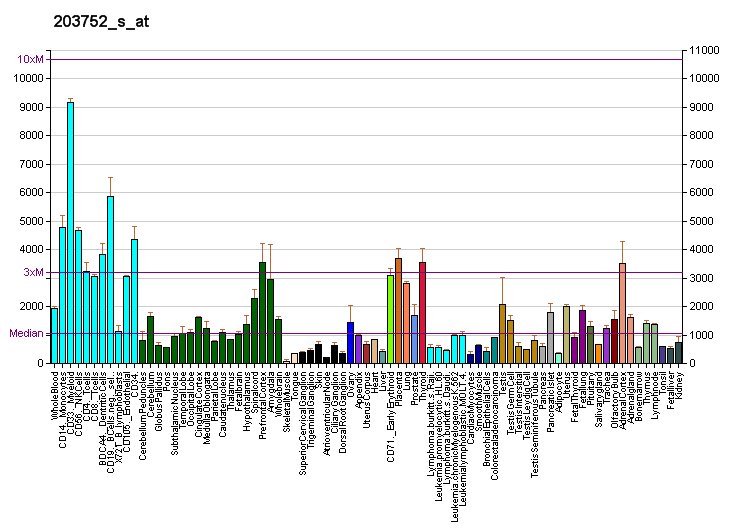
RNA expression pattern
Bgee	Human / Mouse (ortholog); Top expressed in: cardia; vena cava; nipple; paraflocculus of cerebellum; pylorus; renal medulla; lactiferous duct; trachea; saphenous vein; Brodmann area 10 / Top expressed in: granulocyte; adrenal gland; bone marrow; islet of Langerhans; ileum; ganglionic eminence; cerebellar cortex; primary visual cortex; striatum of neuraxis; urinary bladder; More reference expression data
BioGPS	More reference expression data
Gene ontology
Molecular function	DNA binding; sequence-specific DNA binding; DNA-binding transcription factor activity; transcription coactivator activity; protein binding; enzyme binding; double-stranded DNA binding; RNA polymerase II cis-regulatory region sequence-specific DNA binding; transcription factor binding; DNA-binding transcription activator activity, RNA polymerase II-specific; DNA-binding transcription factor activity, RNA polymerase II-specific; nuclear receptor binding
Cellular component	protein-DNA complex; chromatin; nucleus; transcription factor AP-1 complex; protein-containing complex; nucleoplasm; transcription regulator complex
Biological process	cellular response to calcium ion; response to cytokine; regulation of transcription, DNA-templated; response to organic cyclic compound; response to light stimulus; regulation of cell death; ageing; response to peptide hormone; negative regulation of transcription by RNA polymerase II; transcription by RNA polymerase II; transcription, DNA-templated; regulation of cell cycle; cellular response to hormone stimulus; positive regulation of osteoblast differentiation; regulation of cell population proliferation; circadian rhythm; positive regulation of cell differentiation; osteoblast development; response to radiation; response to cAMP; response to lipopolysaccharide; response to mechanical stimulus; regulation of transcription by RNA polymerase II; positive regulation of transcription by RNA polymerase II; response to organic substance
Sources:Amigo / QuickGO
Orthologs
Databases	NCBI: entry; OMA: entry
Species	Human	Mouse
Entrez	3727	16478
Ensembl	ENSG00000130522	ENSMUSG00000071076
UniProt	P17535	P15066
RefSeq (mRNA)	NM_005354; NM_001286968	NM_001286944; NM_010592
RefSeq (protein)	NP_001273897; NP_005345	NP_001273873; NP_034722
Location (UCSC)	Chr 19: 18.28 – 18.28 Mb	Chr 8: 71.15 – 71.15 Mb
PubMed search
- Wikidata
View/Edit Human	View/Edit Mouse

Transcription factor JunD is a protein that in humans is encoded by the JUND gene.

== Function ==
The protein encoded by this intronless gene is a member of the JUN family, and a functional component of the AP1 transcription factor complex. It has been proposed to protect cells from p53-dependent senescence and apoptosis. Alternate translation initiation site usage results in the production of different isoforms.

== ΔJunD ==
The dominant negative mutant variant of JunD, known as ΔJunD or Delta JunD, is a potent antagonist of the ΔFosB transcript, as well as other forms of AP-1-mediated transcriptional activity. In the nucleus accumbens, ΔJunD directly opposes many of the neurological changes that occur in addiction (i.e., those induced by ΔFosB). ΔFosB inhibitors (drugs that oppose its action) may be an effective treatment for addiction and addictive disorders. Being an unnatural genetic variant, ΔJunD has not been observed in humans.

== Interactions ==
JunD has been shown to interact with ATF3, MEN1, DNA damage-inducible transcript 3 and BRCA1.

== See also ==
- AP-1 (transcription factor)
