= FOSL2 =

Protein-coding gene in the species Homo sapiens

Identifiers
- Aliases: FOSL2, Fos-Related Antigen, FRA-2, FRA2, FOS like 2, AP-1 transcription factor subunit
- External IDs: OMIM: 601575; MGI: 102858; GeneCards: FOSL2

Gene location (Human)
Chr.	Chromosome 2 (human)
Band	2p23.2	Start	28,392,448 bp
Band	2p23.2	End	28,417,317 bp

Gene location (Mouse)
Chr.	Chromosome 5 (mouse)
Band	5 B1|5 17.33 cM	Start	32,293,145 bp
Band	5 B1|5 17.33 cM	End	32,315,186 bp
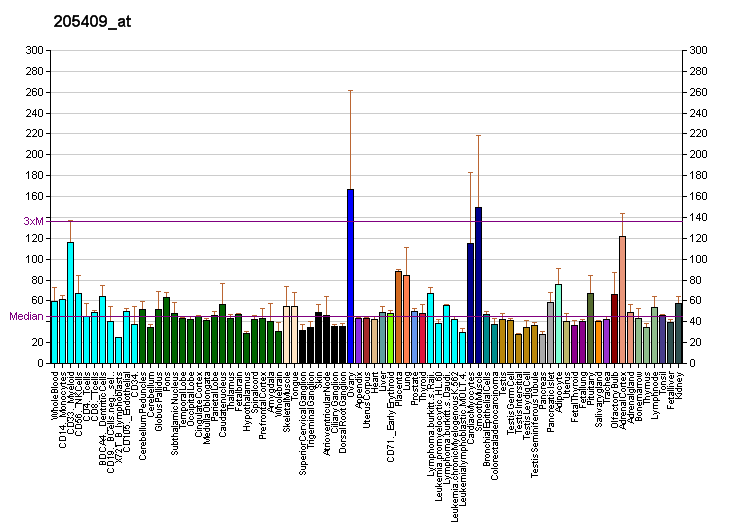

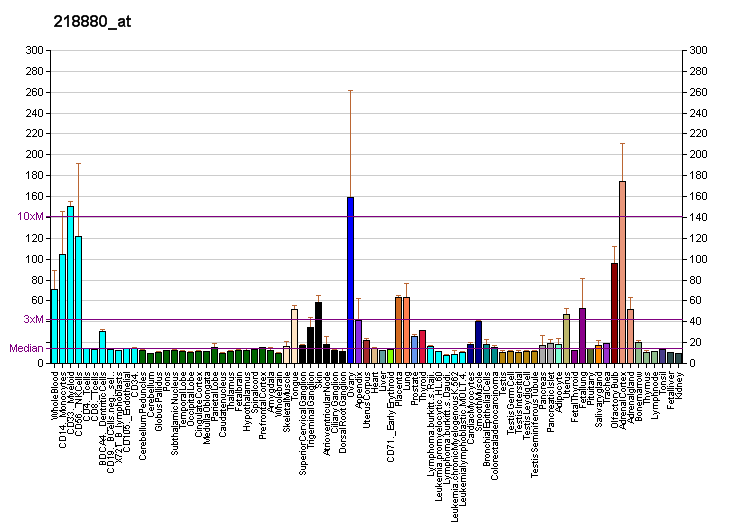

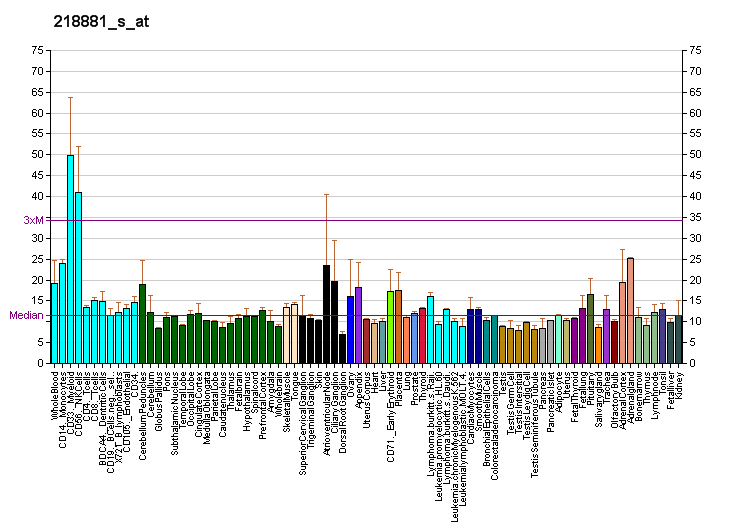
RNA expression pattern
Bgee	Human / Mouse (ortholog); Top expressed in: left adrenal cortex; right adrenal cortex; buccal mucosa cell; gastric mucosa; popliteal artery; tibial arteries; vagina; left ovary; left uterine tube; pericardium / Top expressed in: decidua; gastrula; mucosa of urinary bladder; transitional epithelium of urinary bladder; hair follicle; medullary collecting duct; conjunctival fornix; left colon; umbilical cord; granulocyte; More reference expression data
BioGPS	More reference expression data
Gene ontology
Molecular function	DNA-binding transcription factor activity; DNA binding; chromatin binding; protein binding; RNA polymerase II transcription regulatory region sequence-specific DNA binding; DNA-binding transcription activator activity, RNA polymerase II-specific; DNA-binding transcription factor activity, RNA polymerase II-specific; RNA polymerase II cis-regulatory region sequence-specific DNA binding
Cellular component	nucleus; nucleoplasm
Biological process	regulation of transcription by RNA polymerase II; positive regulation of transcription, DNA-templated; keratinocyte development; cell death; regulation of transcription, DNA-templated; transcription, DNA-templated; positive regulation of fibroblast proliferation; positive regulation of transcription by RNA polymerase II; transcription by RNA polymerase II
Sources:Amigo / QuickGO
Orthologs
Databases	NCBI: entry; OMA: entry
Species	Human	Mouse
Entrez	2355	14284
Ensembl	ENSG00000075426	ENSMUSG00000029135
UniProt	P15408	P47930
RefSeq (mRNA)	NM_005253	NM_008037
RefSeq (protein)	NP_005244	NP_032063
Location (UCSC)	Chr 2: 28.39 – 28.42 Mb	Chr 5: 32.29 – 32.32 Mb
PubMed search
- Wikidata
View/Edit Human	View/Edit Mouse

Fos-related antigen 2 (FRA2) is a protein that in humans is encoded by the FOSL2 gene.

== Function ==
The Fos gene family consists of 4 members: c-Fos, FOSB, FOSL1, and FOSL2. These genes encode leucine zipper proteins that can dimerize with proteins of the JUN family, thereby forming the transcription factor complex AP-1. As such, the FOS proteins have been implicated as regulators of cell proliferation, differentiation, and transformation.

== See also ==
- AP-1 (transcription factor)
