= FOSL1 =

Protein-coding gene in the species Homo sapiens

Identifiers
- Aliases: FOSL1, FRA, FRA1, fra-1, FOS like 1, AP-1 transcription factor subunit
- External IDs: OMIM: 136515; MGI: 107179; GeneCards: FOSL1

Gene location (Human)
Chr.	Chromosome 11 (human)
Band	11q13.1	Start	65,892,049 bp
Band	11q13.1	End	65,900,573 bp

Gene location (Mouse)
Chr.	Chromosome 19 (mouse)
Band	19 A|19 4.33 cM	Start	5,497,575 bp
Band	19 A|19 4.33 cM	End	5,505,974 bp
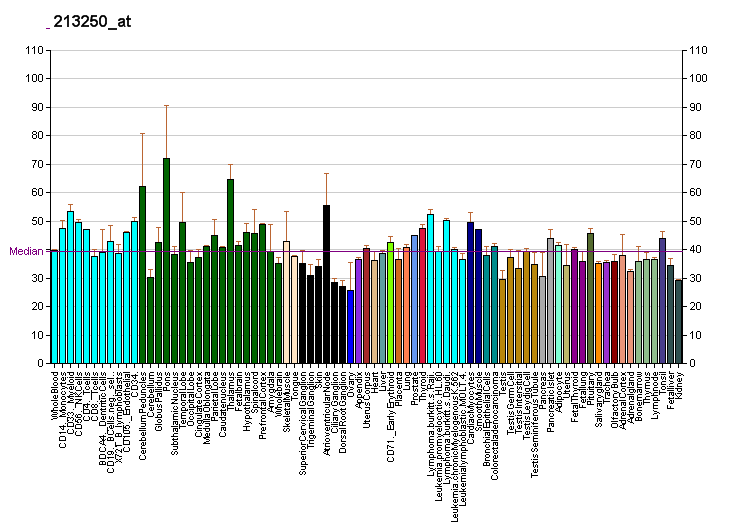

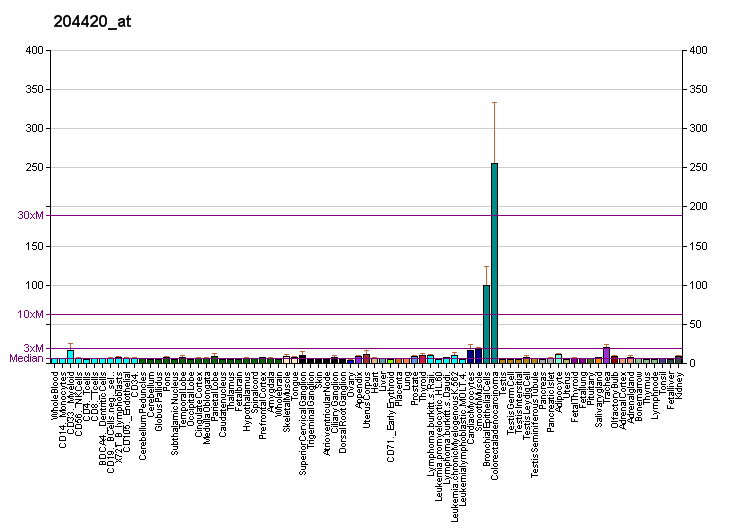
RNA expression pattern
Bgee	Human / Mouse (ortholog); Top expressed in: cartilage tissue; stromal cell of endometrium; gallbladder; vena cava; mucosa of urinary bladder; mucosa of esophagus; testicle; islet of Langerhans; ascending aorta; cervix epithelium / Top expressed in: endothelial cell of lymphatic vessel; granulocyte; decidua; embryo; embryo; gastrula; stroma of bone marrow; supraoptic nucleus; lip; ascending aorta; More reference expression data
BioGPS	More reference expression data
Gene ontology
Molecular function	DNA binding; RNA polymerase II transcription regulatory region sequence-specific DNA binding; DNA-binding transcription factor activity; DNA-binding transcription activator activity, RNA polymerase II-specific; protein binding; RNA polymerase II cis-regulatory region sequence-specific DNA binding; DNA-binding transcription factor activity, RNA polymerase II-specific
Cellular component	cytosol; intracellular membrane-bounded organelle; neuron projection; presynaptic membrane; nucleus; nucleoplasm
Biological process	cellular response to extracellular stimulus; response to cytokine; regulation of transcription, DNA-templated; response to organic cyclic compound; vitellogenesis; regulation of transcription by RNA polymerase II; response to progesterone; female pregnancy; response to corticosterone; response to mechanical stimulus; response to virus; positive regulation of DNA-binding transcription factor activity; placenta blood vessel development; in utero embryonic development; learning; positive regulation of DNA-templated transcription, initiation; chemotaxis; response to gravity; cellular defense response; positive regulation of cell cycle; positive regulation of cell population proliferation; positive regulation of apoptotic process; response to cAMP; response to hydrogen peroxide; positive regulation of transcription by RNA polymerase II; negative regulation of cell population proliferation; pri-miRNA transcription by RNA polymerase II; transcription by RNA polymerase II
Sources:Amigo / QuickGO
Orthologs
Databases	NCBI: entry; OMA: entry
Species	Human	Mouse
Entrez	8061	14283
Ensembl	ENSG00000175592	ENSMUSG00000024912
UniProt	P15407	P48755
RefSeq (mRNA)	NM_001300844; NM_001300855; NM_001300856; NM_001300857; NM_005438	NM_010235
RefSeq (protein)	NP_001287773; NP_001287784; NP_001287785; NP_001287786; NP_005429	NP_034365
Location (UCSC)	Chr 11: 65.89 – 65.9 Mb	Chr 19: 5.5 – 5.51 Mb
PubMed search
- Wikidata
View/Edit Human	View/Edit Mouse

Fos-related antigen 1 (FRA1) is a protein that in humans is encoded by the FOSL1 gene.

== Function ==
The Fos gene family consists of 4 members: c-Fos, FOSB, FOSL1, and FOSL2. These genes encode leucine zipper proteins that can dimerize with proteins of the JUN family, thereby forming the transcription factor complex AP-1. As such, the FOS proteins have been implicated as regulators of cell proliferation, differentiation, and transformation.

== Interactions ==
FOSL1 has been shown to interact with USF1 (human gene) and C-jun.

== See also ==
- AP-1 (transcription factor)
