= Richard Marais =

British cancer researcher

Richard Marais FRS FMedSci MAE
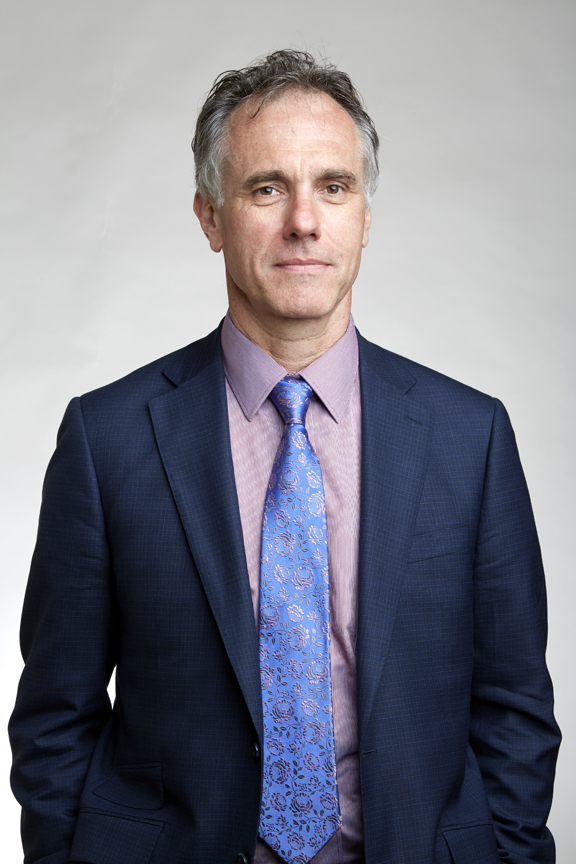
- Marais in 2018
- Education: University College London; Imperial College London
- Awards: EMBO Member (2009); Leopold Griffuel Prize (2017)
- Scientific career
- Fields: Cancer; Melanoma; Cell signalling
- Workplaces: Cancer Research UK; University of Manchester; Institute of Cancer Research
- Thesis: Comparative studies on protein kinase C isotypes (1989)
- Doctoral advisor: Peter Parker
- Other academic advisors: Richard Treisman; Chris Marshall
- Website: www.cruk.manchester.ac.uk/Our-Research/Molecular-Oncology

Richard Malcolm Marais a British researcher who was director of the Cancer Research UK (CRUK) Manchester Institute and professor of molecular oncology at the University of Manchester.

== Education ==
Marais was educated at University College London where he was awarded a Bachelor of Science degree in Genetics and Microbiology in 1985. He completed his postgraduate study at the Ludwig Institute for Cancer Research and was awarded a PhD in 1989 for research on isotypes of the protein kinase C (PKC) enzyme supervised by Peter Parker.

== Career and research ==
Marais's research investigates the biology of melanoma and other cancers in order to deliver better treatment strategies for patients. His studies on B-RAF and cell signalling significantly advanced understanding of melanoma biology and aetiology. He translated his basic research discoveries into clinical implementation, improving patient outcomes, elucidating mechanisms of drug resistance and developing new drugs against BRAF and other cancer targets. His research informs innovative clinical trial designs with signal-seeking biomarkers to monitor therapy responses and optimise patient treatment. His research also highlights the importance of combining sunscreen with other sun avoidance strategies to reduce population melanoma risk.

Marais started his career as a postdoctoral researcher with Richard Treisman at the Imperial Cancer Research Fund (ICRF) in London, where he worked on the oncogene known as c-Fos. This was followed by a period in Chris Marshall’s laboratory at the Institute of Cancer Research (ICR), after which Marais set up his own laboratory in 1998 before moving to Manchester in 2012.

In 2019 Marais asked the University of Manchester to investigate research misconduct linked to a former member of his laboratory.

=== Awards and honours ===
With colleagues, Marais received the American Association for Cancer Research (AACR) Team Science Award in 2012 for cancer drug discoveries. He received the Leopold Griffuel Prize in 2016 and the Outstanding Research Award from the Society for Melanoma Research (SMR) in 2017. He was elected a member of the European Molecular Biology Organization (EMBO) in 2009, a Fellow of the Royal Society (FRS) in 2018, and a Fellow of the Academy of Medical Sciences (FMedSci) in 2008. His citation on election reads:

Richard Marais is Professor of Molecular Oncology at Cancer Research UK and has made important contributions to the understanding of cell signalling pathways, particularly in cancer. He was amongst the first to show that mitogen activated protein kinases regulate gene expression by directly phosphorylating transcription factors. However his greatest impact has been with the RAF kinase family, where he discovered that individual RAF proteins are regulated differentially and shown how they respond to RAS, which is mutated in a third of all human tumours. He was a key member of the team that demonstrated that B-RAF is encoded by an oncogene, which is a culprit in most human melanomas. He went on to validate B-RAF as a therapeutic target. In collaboration with David Barford, he solved the crystal structure of B-RAF and explained how it is activated by mutations that occur in cancer. He elucidated why C-RAF is not mutated in cancer, showing that mutant forms of B-RAF can activate C-RAF through a novel mechanism, establishing a new paradigm of RAF signaling. He is now translating these studies to the clinic by leading a large effort to design and synthesize new anti-B-RAF drugs that will be used to treat melanoma.

Marais was awarded membership of the Academia Europaea (MAE) in 2015.
