= Christopher Marshall (medical scientist) =

British scientist (1949–2015)

Chris Marshall
- Born: Christopher John Marshall; 19 January 1949
- Died: 8 August 2015 (aged 66)
- Known for: Work on RAS and RHO family of small GTPases
- Awards: Fellow of the Royal Society; Fellow of the Academy of Medical Sciences; Member of European Molecular Biology Organisation; Royal Society Buchanan Award; Novartis Medal of the Biochemical Society; Sterling Medal of the University of Pennsylvania; Cancer Research UK Life Time Achievement Award
- Scientific career
- Fields: Cancer; Cell biology
- Workplaces: Cancer Research UK; Institute of Cancer Research

Christopher John Marshall (19 January 1949 – 8 August 2015) was a British scientist who worked as director of the Division for Cancer Biology at the Institute of Cancer Research. Marshall was distinguished for research in the field of tumour cell signalling. His track record includes the discovery of the N-Ras oncogene , the identification of farnesylation of Ras proteins, and the discovery that Ras signals through the MAPK/ERK pathway. These findings have led to therapeutic development of inhibitors of Ras farnesylation, MEK and B-Raf.

== Early life ==
Marshall was born in Birmingham, UK, and educated at the King Henry VIII School, Coventry. He then studied Natural Sciences at the University of Cambridge followed by a DPhil in cell biology at the University of Oxford. His graduate studies were followed by post-doctoral work at the Imperial Cancer Research Fund laboratories at Lincoln's Inn Fields (now part of the Francis Crick Institute) in London and the Dana–Farber Cancer Institute in Boston.

== Oncogene research ==
In 1980, Marshall moved to The Institute of Cancer Research in London, and began studies to identify human cancer genes. This work, in collaboration with his colleague Alan Hall, resulted in the identification of NRAS, a new human oncogene. Subsequent work from his laboratory showed that NRAS has important roles in leukaemia and others demonstrated the role of NRAS in melanoma. Following the identification of NRAS, Marshall concentrated on studying how NRAS and the two other RAS genes, HRAS and KRAS, act in cancer. His work in the field of cell signalling showed how RAS and other signalling proteins are involved in transmitting signals from outside of the cell all the way to the cell nucleus. His work laid the foundation for studies that showed the importance of the BRAF cancer gene in melanoma.

At the time of his death, Marshall's laboratory studied the cell signalling mechanisms that allow cancer cells to disseminate through the body. In particular, these studies were focused on signal transduction pathways regulated by Ras and Rho family of small GTPases.

== Students and alumni ==
Several post-doctoral fellows and graduate students who trained in Professor Marshall's laboratory have gone on to prestigious positions:

- Professor Karen Vousden FRS, CRUK Chief Scientist and Group Leader at the Francis Crick Institute, London, UK.
- Professor John Hancock, IBP Chair and Professor, University of Texas Medical School, USA.
- Professor Alison Lloyd, Professor of Cell Biology, University College London, UK.
- Professor Richard Marais, Professor of Molecular Oncology and Former Head of Cancer Research UK Manchester Institute, UK.
- Professor Mike Olson, Toronto Metropolitan University, Toronto, Canada.
- Professor Erik Sahai, Group Leader, Francis Crick Institute, London, UK.
- Professor Victoria Sanz-Moreno, Group Leader, Institute of Cancer Research, London, UK.
- Professor Faraz Mardakheh, Group Leader, Department of Biochemistry, University of Oxford, Oxford, UK.

== Awards and honours ==
- EMBO Member
- Elected a Fellow of the Royal Society (FRS)
- Elected a Fellow of the Academy of Medical Sciences (FMedSci)
- Fellow of the European Academy of Cancer Sciences
- The Sterling Lecture (University of Pennsylvania)
- The Walter Huppert lecture (British Association for Cancer Research)
- The CH Li Memorial Lecture (University of California, Berkeley)
- 1999 Novartis Medal of the Biochemical Society
- 2008 Buchanan Medal of the Royal Society
- 2011 Cancer Research UK Lifetime Achievement in Cancer Research Award.
