= Richard Treisman =

British scientist (born 1954)

Sir Richard Treisman FRS FMedSci
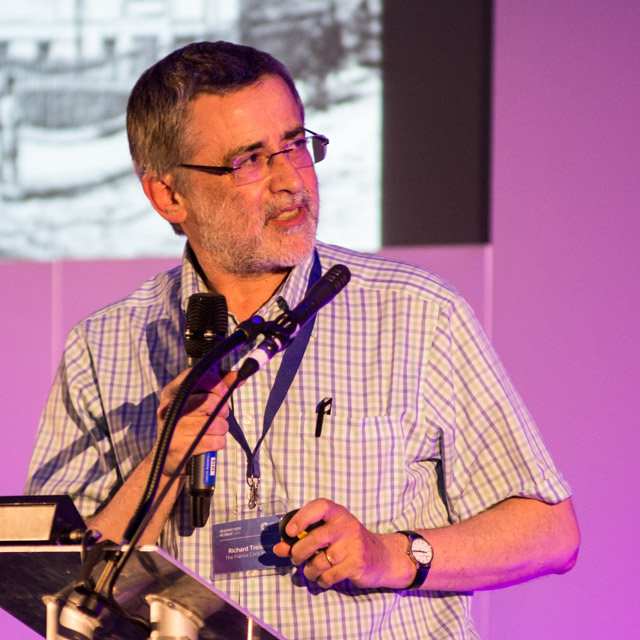
- Treisman in 2015
- Born: 7 October 1954 (age 72)
- Education: Haberdashers' Aske's Boys' School; Christ's College, Cambridge; University College London
- Awards: EMBO Member (1988); EMBO Gold Medal (1995); Louis-Jeantet Prize for Medicine (2002); Knight Bachelor (2016)
- Scientific career
- Workplaces: Francis Crick Institute; Harvard University; University of Cambridge; Laboratory of Molecular Biology
- Thesis: The structures of polyoma virus-specific nuclear and cytoplasmic RNA molecules (1981)
- Doctoral advisor: Bob Kamen
- Other academic advisors: Tom Maniatis
- Notable students: Richard Marais
- Website: www.crick.ac.uk/research/a-z-researchers/researchers-t-u/richard-treisman/

Sir Richard Henry Treisman (born 7 October 1954) is a British scientist specialising in the molecular biology of cancer. Treisman is a director of research at the Francis Crick Institute in London.

== Education ==
Treisman was educated at Haberdashers' Aske's Boys' School and Christ's College, Cambridge, where he was awarded a Bachelor of Arts degree in 1977. He completed his postgraduate study at the Imperial Cancer Research Fund (ICRF) and University College London, where he was awarded a PhD for research on polyomavirus transcription and RNA processing supervised by Bob Kamen in 1981.

== Career and research ==
After his PhD, Treisman pursued postdoctoral research at Harvard University on globin gene expression and thalassemia genes with Tom Maniatis. In 1984, he joined the Medical Research Council (MRC) Laboratory of Molecular Biology (LMB) at the University of Cambridge, where he started working on how growth factors control transcription. Initially focusing on the Fos gene, he identified the transcription factor Serum response factor (SRF) and cloned its gene, before returning to London in 1988.

He showed that the TCF family of SRF cofactors are targets for Mitogen-activated protein kinase (MAPK) signalling, and demonstrated that the MRTF transcription cofactors are novel G-actin binding proteins that sense fluctuations in G-actin concentration. He continues to focus on SRF's regulatory cofactors and their cognate signalling pathways.

Treisman was Director of the Cancer Research UK (CRUK) London Research Institute from 2000 to 2015, becoming Research Director of the Francis Crick Institute in 2009.

=== Awards and honours ===
Treisman was elected a member of the European Molecular Biology Organization in 1988 and a Fellow of the Academy of Medical Sciences (FMedSci) in 2000; he received the EMBO Gold Medal in 1995 and the Louis-Jeantet Prize for Medicine in 2002. He was elected a Fellow of the Royal Society (FRS) in 1994 and knighted in the 2016 Birthday Honours.
