= FOSB =

Protein

Identifiers
- Aliases: FOSB, AP-1, G0S3, GOS3, GOSB, FosB, ΔFosB, FosB proto-oncogene, AP-1 transcription factor subunit
- External IDs: OMIM: 164772; MGI: 95575; GeneCards: FOSB

Gene location (Human)
Chr.	Chromosome 19 (human)
Band	19q13.32	Start	45,467,995 bp
Band	19q13.32	End	45,475,179 bp

Gene location (Mouse)
Chr.	Chromosome 7 (mouse)
Band	7 A3|7 9.56 cM	Start	19,036,621 bp
Band	7 A3|7 9.56 cM	End	19,043,976 bp
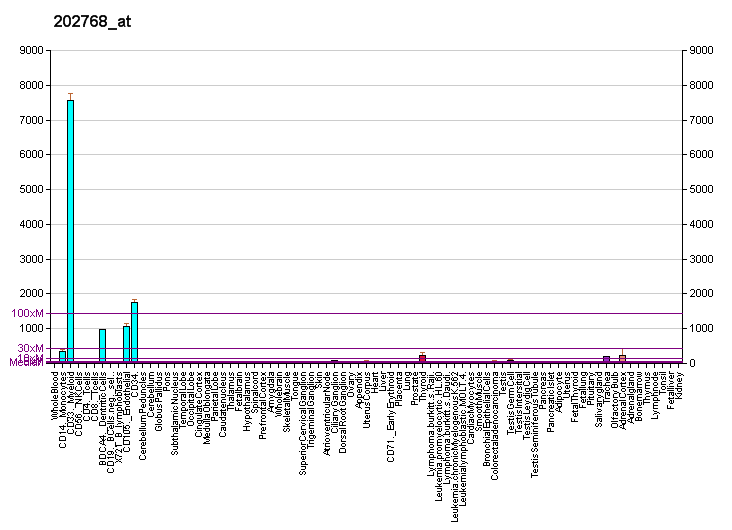
RNA expression pattern
Bgee	Human / Mouse (ortholog); Top expressed in: gastric mucosa; skin of thigh; gallbladder; saphenous vein; nipple; vena cava; granulocyte; mucosa of urinary bladder; mucosa of paranasal sinus; bone marrow cell / Top expressed in: granulocyte; islet of Langerhans; perirhinal cortex; spermatocyte; entorhinal cortex; spermatid; CA3 field; cumulus cell; urethra; male urethra; More reference expression data
BioGPS	More reference expression data
Gene ontology
Molecular function	DNA binding; sequence-specific DNA binding; DNA-binding transcription factor activity; DNA-binding transcription activator activity, RNA polymerase II-specific; transcription factor binding; double-stranded DNA binding; RNA polymerase II cis-regulatory region sequence-specific DNA binding; DNA-binding transcription factor activity, RNA polymerase II-specific
Cellular component	intracellular membrane-bounded organelle; nucleus; nucleoplasm
Biological process	cellular response to calcium ion; regulation of transcription, DNA-templated; regulation of transcription by RNA polymerase II; response to progesterone; female pregnancy; response to corticosterone; response to mechanical stimulus; negative regulation of transcription by RNA polymerase II; transcription by RNA polymerase II; response to morphine; cellular response to hormone stimulus; response to cAMP; positive regulation of transcription by RNA polymerase II
Sources:Amigo / QuickGO
Orthologs
Databases	NCBI: entry; OMA: entry
Species	Human	Mouse
Entrez	2354	14282
Ensembl	ENSG00000125740	ENSMUSG00000003545
UniProt	P53539	P13346
RefSeq (mRNA)	NM_001114171; NM_006732	NM_008036; NM_001347586
RefSeq (protein)	NP_001107643; NP_006723	NP_001334515; NP_032062
Location (UCSC)	Chr 19: 45.47 – 45.48 Mb	Chr 7: 19.04 – 19.04 Mb
PubMed search
- Wikidata
View/Edit Human	View/Edit Mouse

Protein fosB, also known as G0/G1 switch regulatory protein 3 (G0S3), is a protein that in humans is encoded by the gene FOSB (FBJ murine osteosarcoma viral oncogene homolog B).

The FOS gene family consists of four members: FOS, FOSB, FOSL1, and FOSL2. These genes encode leucine zipper proteins that can dimerize with proteins of the JUN family (e.g., c-Jun, JunD), thereby forming the transcription factor complex AP-1. As such, the FOS proteins have been implicated as regulators of cell proliferation, differentiation, and transformation. FosB and its truncated splice variants, ΔFosB and further truncated Δ2ΔFosB, are all involved in osteosclerosis, although Δ2ΔFosB lacks a known transactivation domain, in turn preventing it from affecting transcription through the AP-1 complex.

The ΔFosB splice variant has been identified as playing a central, crucial role in the development and maintenance of addiction. ΔFosB overexpression (i.e., an abnormally and excessively high level of ΔFosB expression which produces a pronounced gene-related phenotype) triggers the development of addiction-related neuroplasticity throughout the reward system and produces a behavioral phenotype that is characteristic of an addiction. ΔFosB differs from the full length FosB and further truncated Δ2ΔFosB in its capacity to produce these effects, as only accumbal ΔFosB overexpression is associated with pathological responses to drugs.

== DeltaFosB ==
DeltaFosB – more commonly written as ΔFosB – is a truncated splice variant of the FOSB gene. ΔFosB has been implicated as a critical factor in the development of virtually all forms of behavioral and drug addictions. In the brain's reward system, it is linked to changes in a number of other gene products, such as CREB and sirtuins. In the body, ΔFosB regulates the commitment of mesenchymal precursor cells to the adipocyte or osteoblast lineage.

In the nucleus accumbens, ΔFosB functions as a "sustained molecular switch" and "master control protein" in the development of an addiction. In other words, once "turned on" (sufficiently overexpressed) ΔFosB triggers a series of transcription events that ultimately produce an addictive state (i.e., compulsive reward-seeking involving a particular stimulus); this state is sustained for months after cessation of drug use due to the abnormal and exceptionally long half-life of ΔFosB isoforms. ΔFosB expression in D1-type nucleus accumbens medium spiny neurons directly and positively regulates drug self-administration and reward sensitization through positive reinforcement while decreasing sensitivity to aversion. Based upon the accumulated evidence, a medical review from late 2014 argued that accumbal ΔFosB expression can be used as an addiction biomarker and that the degree of accumbal ΔFosB induction by a drug is a metric for how addictive it is relative to others.

Chronic administration of anandamide, or N-arachidonylethanolamide (AEA), an endogenous cannabinoid, and additives such as sucralose, a noncaloric sweetener used in many food products of daily intake, are found to induce an overexpression of ΔFosB in the infralimbic cortex (Cx), nucleus accumbens (NAc) core, shell, and central nucleus of amygdala (Amy), inducing long-term changes in the reward system.

=== Role in addiction ===
Addiction and dependence glossary
- addiction – a neuropsychological disorder characterized by a persistent and intense urge to use a drug or engage in a behavior that produces natural reward; addictive drug – psychoactive substances that with repeated use are associated with significantly higher rates of substance use disorders, due in large part to the drug's effect on brain reward systems; dependence – an adaptive state associated with a withdrawal syndrome upon cessation of repeated exposure to a stimulus (e.g., drug intake); drug sensitization or reverse tolerance – the escalating effect of a drug resulting from repeated administration at a given dose; drug withdrawal – symptoms that occur upon cessation of repeated drug use; physical dependence – dependence that involves persistent physical–somatic withdrawal symptoms (e.g., delirium tremens and nausea); psychological dependence – dependence that is characterized by emotional-motivational withdrawal symptoms (e.g., anhedonia and anxiety) that affect cognitive functioning.; reinforcing stimuli – stimuli that increase the probability of repeating behaviors paired with them; rewarding stimuli – stimuli that the brain interprets as intrinsically positive and desirable or as something to approach; sensitization – an amplified response to a stimulus resulting from repeated exposure to it; substance use disorder – a condition in which the use of substances leads to clinically and functionally significant impairment or distress; drug tolerance – the diminishing effect of a drug resulting from repeated administration at a given dose

Signaling cascade in the nucleus accumbens that results in psychostimulant addiction
This diagram depicts the signaling events in the brain's reward center that are induced by chronic high-dose exposure to psychostimulants that increase the concentration of synaptic dopamine, like amphetamine, methamphetamine, and phenethylamine. Following presynaptic dopamine and glutamate co-release by such psychostimulants, postsynaptic receptors for these neurotransmitters trigger internal signaling events through a cAMP-dependent pathway and a calcium-dependent pathway that ultimately result in increased CREB phosphorylation. Phosphorylated CREB increases levels of ΔFosB, which in turn represses the c-Fos gene with the help of corepressors; c-Fos repression acts as a molecular switch that enables the accumulation of ΔFosB in the neuron. A highly stable (phosphorylated) form of ΔFosB, one that persists in neurons for 1–2 months, slowly accumulates following repeated high-dose exposure to stimulants through this process. ΔFosB functions as "one of the master control proteins" that produces addiction-related structural changes in the brain, and upon sufficient accumulation, with the help of its downstream targets (e.g., nuclear factor kappa B), it induces an addictive state.

Chronic addictive drug use causes alterations in gene expression in the mesocorticolimbic projection, which arise through transcriptional and epigenetic mechanisms. The most important transcription factors that produce these alterations are ΔFosB, cyclic adenosine monophosphate (cAMP) response element binding protein (CREB), and nuclear factor kappa B (NF-κB). ΔFosB is the most significant biomolecular mechanism in addiction because the overexpression of ΔFosB in the D1-type medium spiny neurons in the nucleus accumbens is necessary and sufficient for many of the neural adaptations and behavioral effects (e.g., expression-dependent increases in drug self-administration and reward sensitization) seen in drug addiction. ΔFosB overexpression has been implicated in addictions to alcohol, cannabinoids, cocaine, methylphenidate, nicotine, opioids, phencyclidine, propofol, and substituted amphetamines, among others. ΔJunD, a transcription factor, and G9a, a histone methyltransferase, both oppose the function of ΔFosB and inhibit increases in its expression. Increases in nucleus accumbens ΔJunD expression (via viral vector-mediated gene transfer) or G9a expression (via pharmacological means) reduces, or with a large increase can even block, many of the neural and behavioral alterations seen in chronic drug abuse (i.e., the alterations mediated by ΔFosB). Repression of c-Fos by ΔFosB, which consequently further induces expression of ΔFosB, forms a positive feedback loop that serves to indefinitely perpetuate the addictive state.

ΔFosB also plays an important role in regulating behavioral responses to natural rewards, such as palatable food, sex, and exercise. Natural rewards, similar to drugs of abuse, induce gene expression of ΔFosB in the nucleus accumbens, and chronic acquisition of these rewards can result in a similar pathological addictive state through ΔFosB overexpression. Consequently, ΔFosB is the key mechanism involved in addictions to natural rewards (i.e., behavioral addictions) as well; in particular, ΔFosB in the nucleus accumbens is critical for the reinforcing effects of sexual reward. Research on the interaction between natural and drug rewards suggests that dopaminergic psychostimulants (e.g., amphetamine) and sexual behavior act on similar biomolecular mechanisms to induce ΔFosB in the nucleus accumbens and possess bidirectional reward cross-sensitization effects (Note: In simplest terms, this means that when either amphetamine or sex is perceived as "more alluring or desirable" through reward sensitization, this effect occurs with the other as well.) that are mediated through ΔFosB. This phenomenon is notable since, in humans, a dopamine dysregulation syndrome, characterized by drug-induced compulsive engagement in natural rewards (specifically, sexual activity, shopping, and gambling), has also been observed in some individuals taking dopaminergic medications.

ΔFosB inhibitors (drugs or treatments that oppose its action or reduce its expression) may be an effective treatment for addiction and addictive disorders. Current medical reviews of research involving lab animals have identified a drug class – class I histone deacetylase inhibitors (Note: Inhibitors of class I histone deacetylase (HDAC) enzymes are drugs that inhibit four specific histone-modifying enzymes: HDAC1, HDAC2, HDAC3, and HDAC8. Most of the animal research with HDAC inhibitors has been conducted with four drugs: butyrate salts (mainly sodium butyrate), trichostatin A, valproic acid, and SAHA; butyric acid is a naturally occurring short-chain fatty acid in humans, while the latter two compounds are FDA-approved drugs with medical indications unrelated to addiction.) – that indirectly inhibits the function and further increases in the expression of accumbal ΔFosB by inducing G9a expression in the nucleus accumbens after prolonged use. These reviews and subsequent preliminary evidence which used oral administration or intraperitoneal administration of the sodium salt of butyric acid or other class I HDAC inhibitors for an extended period indicate that these drugs have efficacy in reducing addictive behavior in lab animals (Note: Specifically, prolonged administration of a class I HDAC inhibitor appears to reduce an animal's motivation to acquire and use an addictive drug without affecting an animal's motivation to attain other rewards (i.e., it does not appear to cause motivational anhedonia) and reduce the amount of the drug that is self-administered when it is readily available.) that have developed addictions to ethanol, psychostimulants (i.e., amphetamine and cocaine), nicotine, and opiates; however, as of August 2015, few clinical trials involving humans with addiction and any HDAC class I inhibitors have been conducted to test for treatment efficacy in humans or identify an optimal dosing regimen. (Note: Among the few clinical trials that employed a class I HDAC inhibitor, one utilized valproate for methamphetamine addiction.)

==== Plasticity in cocaine addiction ====
ΔFosB accumulation from excessive drug use
Top: this depicts the initial effects of high dose exposure to an addictive drug on gene expression in the nucleus accumbens for various Fos family proteins (i.e., c-Fos, FosB, ΔFosB, Fra1, and Fra2).
Bottom: this illustrates the progressive increase in ΔFosB expression in the nucleus accumbens following repeated twice daily drug binges, where these phosphorylated (35–37 kilodalton) ΔFosB isoforms persist in the D1-type medium spiny neurons of the nucleus accumbens for up to 2 months.

ΔFosB levels have been found to increase upon the use of cocaine. Each subsequent dose of cocaine continues to increase ΔFosB levels with no apparent ceiling of tolerance. Elevated levels of ΔFosB leads to increases in brain-derived neurotrophic factor (BDNF) levels, which in turn increases the number of dendritic branches and spines present on neurons involved with the nucleus accumbens and prefrontal cortex areas of the brain. This change can be identified rather quickly, and may be sustained weeks after the last dose of the drug.

Transgenic mice exhibiting inducible expression of ΔFosB primarily in the nucleus accumbens and dorsal striatum exhibit sensitized behavioural responses to cocaine. They self-administer cocaine at lower doses than control, but have a greater likelihood of relapse when the drug is withheld. ΔFosB increases the expression of AMPA receptor subunit GluR2 and also decreases expression of dynorphin, thereby enhancing sensitivity to reward.

Neural and behavioral effects of validated ΔFosB transcriptional targets
Target gene	Target expression	Neural effects	Behavioral effects
c-Fos	↓	Molecular switch enabling the chronic induction of ΔFosB (Note: In other words, c-Fos repression allows ΔFosB to accumulate within nucleus accumbens medium spiny neurons more rapidly because it is selectively induced in this state.)	–
dynorphin	↓ (Note: ΔFosB has been implicated in causing both increases and decreases in dynorphin expression in different studies; this table entry reflects only a decrease.)	• Downregulation of κ-opioid feedback loop	• Diminished self-extinguishing response to drug
NF-κB	↑	• Expansion of Nacc dendritic processes • NF-κB inflammatory response in the NAcc • NF-κB inflammatory response in the CP	• Increased drug reward • Locomotor sensitization
GluR2	↑	• Decreased sensitivity to glutamate	• Increased drug reward
Cdk5	↑	• GluR1 synaptic protein phosphorylation • Expansion of NAcc dendritic processes	• Decreased drug reward (net effect)

=== Summary of addiction-related plasticity ===
Form of neuroplasticity or behavioral plasticity	Type of reinforcer						Ref.
Form of neuroplasticity or behavioral plasticity	Opiates	Psychostimulants	High fat or sugar food	Sexual intercourse	Physical exercise (aerobic)	Environmental enrichment	Ref.
ΔFosB expression in nucleus accumbens D1-type MSNs	↑	↑	↑	↑	↑	↑	
Behavioral plasticity
Escalation of intake	Yes	Yes	Yes				
Psychostimulant cross-sensitization	Yes	Not applicable	Yes	Yes	Attenuated	Attenuated	
Psychostimulant self-administration	↑	↑	↓		↓	↓	
Psychostimulant conditioned place preference	↑	↑	↓	↑	↓	↑	
Reinstatement of drug-seeking behavior	↑	↑			↓	↓	
Neurochemical plasticity
CREB phosphorylation in the nucleus accumbens	↓	↓	↓		↓	↓	
Sensitized dopamine response in the nucleus accumbens	No	Yes	No	Yes			
Altered striatal dopamine signaling	↓DRD2, ↑DRD3	↑DRD1, ↓DRD2, ↑DRD3	↑DRD1, ↓DRD2, ↑DRD3		↑DRD2	↑DRD2	
Altered striatal opioid signaling	No change or ↑μ-opioid receptors	↑μ-opioid receptors ↑κ-opioid receptors	↑μ-opioid receptors	↑μ-opioid receptors	No change	No change	
Changes in striatal opioid peptides	↑dynorphin No change: enkephalin	↑dynorphin	↓enkephalin		↑dynorphin	↑dynorphin	
Mesocorticolimbic synaptic plasticity
Number of dendrites in the nucleus accumbens	↓	↑		↑			
Dendritic spine density in the nucleus accumbens	↓	↑		↑			

=== Other functions in the brain ===
Viral overexpression of ΔFosB in the output neurons of the nigrostriatal dopamine pathway (i.e., the medium spiny neurons in the dorsal striatum) induces levodopa-induced dyskinesias in animal models of Parkinson's disease. Dorsal striatal ΔFosB is overexpressed in rodents and primates with dyskinesias; postmortem studies of individuals with Parkinson's disease that were treated with levodopa have also observed similar dorsal striatal ΔFosB overexpression. Levetiracetam, an antiepileptic drug, has been shown to dose-dependently decrease the induction of dorsal striatal ΔFosB expression in rats when co-administered with levodopa; the signal transduction involved in this effect is unknown.

ΔFosB expression in the nucleus accumbens shell increases resilience to stress and is induced in this region by acute exposure to social defeat stress.

Antipsychotic drugs have been shown to increase ΔFosB as well, more specifically in the prefrontal cortex. This increase has been found to be part of pathways for the negative side effects that such drugs produce.

== See also ==
- AP-1 (transcription factor)

== Notes ==
Image legend
