= RBM39 =

Protein-coding gene in the species Homo sapiens

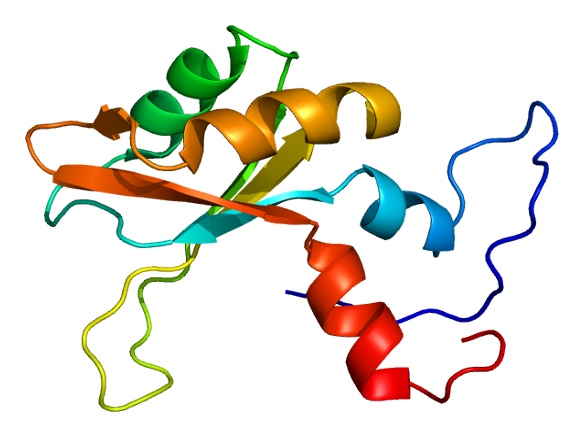

Identifiers
- Aliases: RBM39, CAPER, CAPERalpha, FSAP59, HCC1, RNPC2, RNA binding motif protein 39
- External IDs: OMIM: 604739; MGI: 2157953; GeneCards: RBM39
Available structures
PDB	Ortholog search: PDBe RCSB
PDB	List of PDB id codes 2JRS, 2MHN, 4OO6, 4OZ0, 4OZ1, 4YUD

Gene location (Human)
Chr.	Chromosome 20 (human)
Band	20q11.22	Start	35,701,347 bp
Band	20q11.22	End	35,742,312 bp

Gene location (Mouse)
Chr.	Chromosome 2 (mouse)
Band	2|2 H1	Start	156,147,239 bp
Band	2|2 H1	End	156,180,238 bp
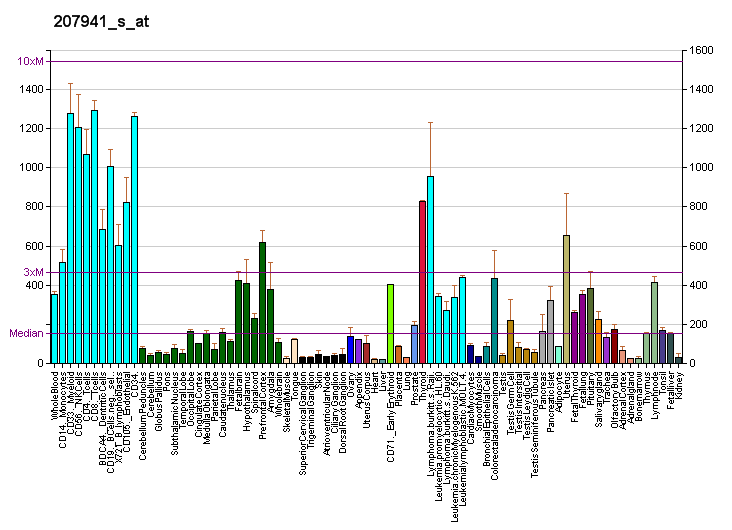

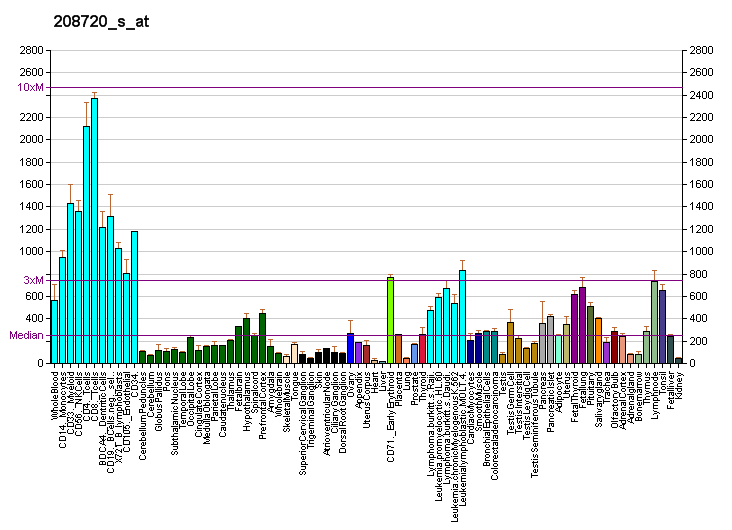
RNA expression pattern
Bgee	Human / Mouse (ortholog); Top expressed in: right uterine tube; Achilles tendon; right lobe of thyroid gland; left ovary; right ovary; left lobe of thyroid gland; sural nerve; body of uterus; ventricular zone; canal of the cervix / Top expressed in: genital tubercle; tail of embryo; neural layer of retina; ventricular zone; Rostral migratory stream; spermatocyte; neural tube; granulocyte; medullary collecting duct; Gonadal ridge; More reference expression data
BioGPS	More reference expression data
Gene ontology
Molecular function	nucleic acid binding; protein binding; RNA binding
Cellular component	microtubule cytoskeleton; nucleus; nucleoplasm; microtubule organizing center; nuclear speck; protein-containing complex
Biological process	mRNA processing; RNA processing; regulation of transcription, DNA-templated; transcription, DNA-templated; RNA splicing
Sources:Amigo / QuickGO
Orthologs
Databases	NCBI: entry; OMA: entry
Species	Human	Mouse
Entrez	9584	170791
Ensembl	ENSG00000131051	ENSMUSG00000027620
UniProt	Q14498; Q5QP23	Q8VH51
RefSeq (mRNA)	NM_001242599; NM_001242600; NM_004902; NM_184234; NM_184237 NM_184241; NM_184244; NM_001323422; NM_001323423; NM_001323424	NM_001291114; NM_001291115; NM_133242; NM_001362763; NM_001362764 NM_001362765; NM_001362766; NM_001362767; NM_001362768; NM_001362769
RefSeq (protein)	NP_001229528; NP_001229529; NP_001310351; NP_001310352; NP_001310353 NP_004893; NP_909122	NP_001278043; NP_001278044; NP_573505; NP_001349692; NP_001349693 NP_001349694; NP_001349695; NP_001349696; NP_001349697; NP_001349698
Location (UCSC)	Chr 20: 35.7 – 35.74 Mb	Chr 2: 156.15 – 156.18 Mb
PubMed search
- Wikidata
View/Edit Human	View/Edit Mouse

RNA-binding protein 39 is a protein that in humans is encoded by the RBM39 gene.

== Function ==
The protein encoded by this gene is an RNA binding protein and possible splicing factor. The encoded protein is found in the nucleus, where it colocalizes with core spliceosomal proteins. Studies of a mouse protein with high sequence similarity to this protein suggest that this protein may act as a transcriptional coactivator for JUN/AP-1 and estrogen receptors. Multiple transcript variants encoding different isoforms have been observed for this gene.

== Interactions ==
RBM39 has been shown to interact with Estrogen receptor alpha, Estrogen receptor beta and C-jun.
