= E3 ubiquitin-protein ligase COP1 =

Enzyme found in humans

COP1

Identifiers
- Aliases: COP1, RNF200, ring finger and WD repeat domain 2, E3 ubiquitin ligase, RFWD2, COP1 E3 ubiquitin ligase, FAP78, CFAP78
- External IDs: OMIM: 608067; MGI: 1347046; GeneCards: COP1
Available structures
PDB	Ortholog search: PDBe RCSB
PDB	List of PDB id codes 5IGQ, 5HQG
Enzyme activity
EC #	BRENDA	ExPASy	KEGG	MetaCyc
2.3.2.27	↗	↗	↗	↗

Gene location (Human)
Chr.	Chromosome 1 (human)
Band	1q25.1-q25.2	Start	175,944,831 bp
Band	1q25.1-q25.2	End	176,207,286 bp

Gene location (Mouse)
Chr.	Chromosome 1 (mouse)
Band	1|1 H1	Start	159,059,890 bp
Band	1|1 H1	End	159,175,210 bp
RNA expression pattern
Bgee	Human / Mouse (ortholog); Top expressed in: mucosa of ileum; mucosa of transverse colon; ganglionic eminence; blood; ventricular zone; gonad; white blood cell; monocyte; bone marrow cell; skin of arm / Top expressed in: zygote; tail of embryo; genital tubercle; granulocyte; ventricular zone; muscle of thigh; spermatocyte; esophagus; dentate gyrus of hippocampal formation granule cell; spermatid; More reference expression data
BioGPS	n/a
Gene ontology
Molecular function	protein binding; metal ion binding; ubiquitin-protein transferase activity; transferase activity; ubiquitin protein ligase activity; zinc ion binding
Cellular component	nuclear speck; cytosol; Golgi membrane; nucleus; cytoplasm; nucleoplasm; Cul4A-RING E3 ubiquitin ligase complex; centrosome; focal adhesion
Biological process	protein ubiquitination; response to ionizing radiation; positive regulation of proteasomal ubiquitin-dependent protein catabolic process; post-translational protein modification; proteasome-mediated ubiquitin-dependent protein catabolic process
Sources:Amigo / QuickGO
Orthologs
Databases	NCBI: entry; OMA: entry
Species	Human	Mouse
Entrez	64326	26374
Ensembl	ENSG00000143207	ENSMUSG00000040782
UniProt	Q8NHY2	Q9R1A8
RefSeq (mRNA)	NM_001001740; NM_001286644; NM_022457	NM_011931; NM_001360878
RefSeq (protein)	NP_001001740; NP_001273573; NP_071902	NP_036061; NP_001347807
Location (UCSC)	Chr 1: 175.94 – 176.21 Mb	Chr 1: 159.06 – 159.18 Mb
PubMed search
- Wikidata
View/Edit Human	View/Edit Mouse

E3 ubiquitin-protein ligase COP1 is an enzyme that in humans is encoded by the COP1 gene (previously RFWD2).

== Interactions ==
COP1 has been shown to interact with C-jun.
