= Alison Lloyd =

British neurobiologist and cancer researcher

Alison Lloyd FMedSci
- Occupations: Neurobiologist; cancer researcher

Academic background
- Education: University College London; Institute of Cancer Research
- Thesis: The role of intracellular signalling pathways in "ras" transformation (1989)

Academic work
- Discipline: Cell biology
- Sub-discipline: Neurobiology; cancer biology
- Institutions: University College London

Alison Clare Lloyd is a British neurobiologist and cancer researcher. After getting her PhD at Christopher Marshall's laboratory in the Institute of Cancer Research, she started working at the University College London, where she later became Professor of Cell Biology. She was elected Fellow of the Academy of Medical Sciences in 2020.

== Biography ==
Alison Clare Lloyd was educated at University College London, where she got the Biochemistry Prize in 1984 and her BS in 1985, and the Institute of Cancer Research, where she got her PhD in 1989. Her doctoral dissertation, completed in Christopher Marshall's laboratory in the Chester Beatty Laboratories, was titled The role of intracellular signalling pathways in "ras" transformation.

Lloyd later worked as a postdoctoral fellow at Bohdan Wasylyk's laboratory at the Institut de Chimie Biologique in Strasbourg (1989–1991) and at Hartmut Land's lab at the Imperial Cancer Research Fund (1993–1997), and she was Manager of Transfer Technology of the Ludwig Institute for Cancer Research from 1991 to 1993. In 1998, she began working at the MRC Laboratory of Molecular Biology, where she has served as a CRUK Senior Cancer Research Fellow, as the leader of a research group specialising in cell growth and tissue regeneration, and as director. She became Reader at University College London in 2006 and was promoted to Professor of Cell Biology at the UCL Faculty of Life Sciences in 2009.

As an academic, Lloyd specialises in neurobiology and its links to cancer. The Academy of Medical Sciences described her as "a world-leading researcher on the biology and pathology of the peripheral nervous system" and "an influential member of the international Neurofibromatosis community". She was elected Fellow of the Academy of Medical Sciences in 2020 for her work on neurobiology.
