= Protein kinase D1 =

Protein-coding gene in the species Homo sapiens

PRKD1

Identifiers
- Aliases: PRKD1, PKC-MU, PKCM, PKD, PRKCM, Protein kinase D1, CHDED
- External IDs: OMIM: 605435; MGI: 99879; GeneCards: PRKD1
Enzyme activity
EC #	BRENDA	ExPASy	KEGG	MetaCyc
2.7.11.13	↗	↗	↗	↗

Gene location (Human)
Chr.	Chromosome 14 (human)
Band	14q12	Start	29,576,479 bp
Band	14q12	End	30,191,898 bp

Gene location (Mouse)
Chr.	Chromosome 12 (mouse)
Band	12|12 B3	Start	50,341,231 bp
Band	12|12 B3	End	50,649,098 bp
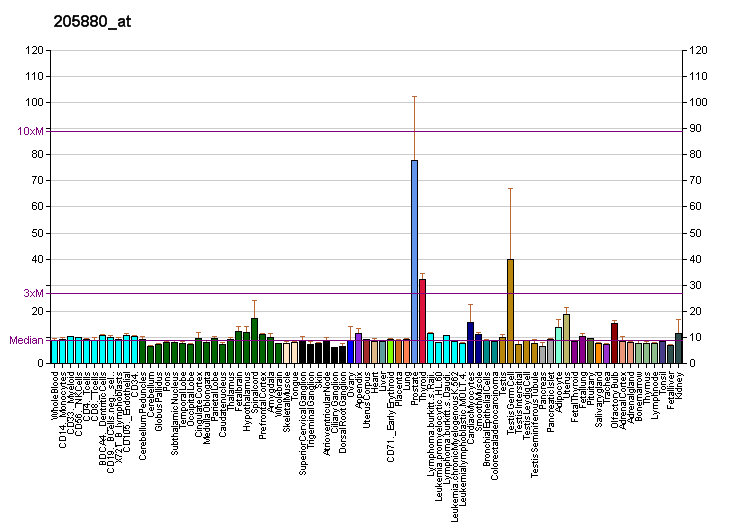
RNA expression pattern
Bgee	Human / Mouse (ortholog); Top expressed in: ventricular zone; seminal vesicula; thoracic aorta; ascending aorta; testicle; saphenous vein; Descending thoracic aorta; right coronary artery; popliteal artery; tibial arteries / Top expressed in: primitive streak; substantia nigra; external carotid artery; internal carotid artery; fossa; primary oocyte; condyle; renal corpuscle; epithelium of lens; vas deferens; More reference expression data
BioGPS	More reference expression data
Gene ontology
Molecular function	transferase activity; nucleotide binding; protein kinase activity; protein kinase C activity; metal ion binding; kinase activity; protein binding; identical protein binding; ATP binding; protein serine/threonine kinase activity
Cellular component	Golgi apparatus; membrane; plasma membrane; integral component of plasma membrane; autophagosome membrane; cytoplasm; trans-Golgi network; cytosol
Biological process	negative regulation of endocytosis; cell differentiation; intracellular signal transduction; positive regulation of endothelial cell proliferation; regulation of protein stability; Golgi organization; phosphorylation; immune system process; positive regulation of endothelial cell chemotaxis; protein kinase D signaling; sphingolipid biosynthetic process; negative regulation of cell death; nervous system development; positive regulation of peptidyl-serine phosphorylation; positive regulation of angiogenesis; positive regulation of endothelial cell migration; protein phosphorylation; positive regulation of histone deacetylase activity; positive regulation of CREB transcription factor activity; vascular endothelial growth factor receptor signaling pathway; regulation of integrin-mediated signaling pathway; positive regulation of NF-kappaB transcription factor activity; angiogenesis; positive regulation of blood vessel endothelial cell migration; positive regulation of neuron projection development; positive regulation of endothelial cell chemotaxis by VEGF-activated vascular endothelial growth factor receptor signaling pathway; positive regulation of I-kappaB kinase/NF-kappaB signaling; integrin-mediated signaling pathway; protein autophosphorylation; cellular response to oxidative stress; cellular response to vascular endothelial growth factor stimulus; Ras protein signal transduction; cell population proliferation; inflammatory response; innate immune response; signal transduction; positive regulation of transcription by RNA polymerase II; apoptotic process; positive regulation of autophagy; cellular response to amino acid starvation; positive regulation of phosphatidylinositol 3-kinase activity; cellular response to hydroperoxide; regulation of keratinocyte proliferation; positive regulation of osteoblast differentiation; Golgi vesicle transport; peptidyl-serine phosphorylation; peptidyl-threonine phosphorylation
Sources:Amigo / QuickGO
Orthologs
Databases	NCBI: entry; OMA: entry
Species	Human	Mouse
Entrez	5587	18760
Ensembl	ENSG00000184304	ENSMUSG00000002688
UniProt	Q15139	Q62101
RefSeq (mRNA)	NM_002742; NM_001330069; NM_001348390	NM_008858
RefSeq (protein)	NP_001316998; NP_002733; NP_001335319	NP_032884; NP_001369743; NP_001369744; NP_001369745
Location (UCSC)	Chr 14: 29.58 – 30.19 Mb	Chr 12: 50.34 – 50.65 Mb
PubMed search
- Wikidata
View/Edit Human	View/Edit Mouse

Serine/threonine-protein kinase D1 is an enzyme that in humans is encoded by the PRKD1 gene.

== Function ==
Members of the protein kinase D (PKD) family function in many extracellular receptor-mediated signal transduction pathways. The PRKCM gene encodes a cytosolic serine-threonine kinase that binds to the trans-Golgi network and regulates the fission of transport carriers specifically destined to the cell surface.[supplied by OMIM]

== Interactions ==
Protein kinase D1 has been shown to interact with:

- Bruton's tyrosine kinase,
- C1QBP,
- Centaurin, alpha 1,
- Metallothionein 2A, and
- YWHAQ.
