= Transcription factor Jun =

Protein found in humans

JUN
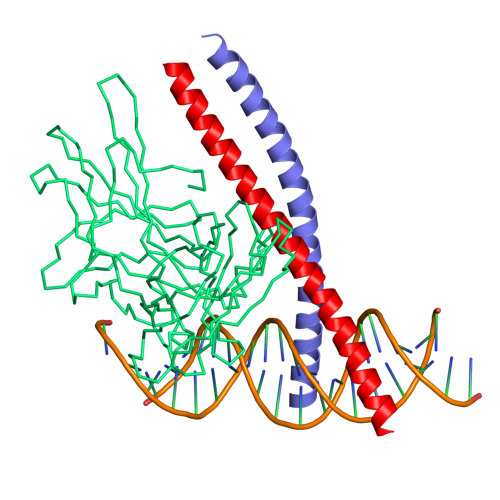

Identifiers
- Aliases: JUN, AP-1, AP1, c-Jun, Jun proto-oncogene, AP-1 transcription factor subunit, p39, cJUN
- External IDs: OMIM: 165160; MGI: 96646; GeneCards: JUN
Available structures
PDB	Ortholog search: PDBe RCSB
PDB	List of PDB id codes 1A02, 1JNM, 1JUN, 1S9K, 1T2K, 1FOS

Gene location (Human)
Chr.	Chromosome 1 (human)
Band	1p32.1	Start	58,776,845 bp
Band	1p32.1	End	58,784,048 bp

Gene location (Mouse)
Chr.	Chromosome 4 (mouse)
Band	4 C5|4 43.34 cM	Start	94,937,271 bp
Band	4 C5|4 43.34 cM	End	94,940,459 bp
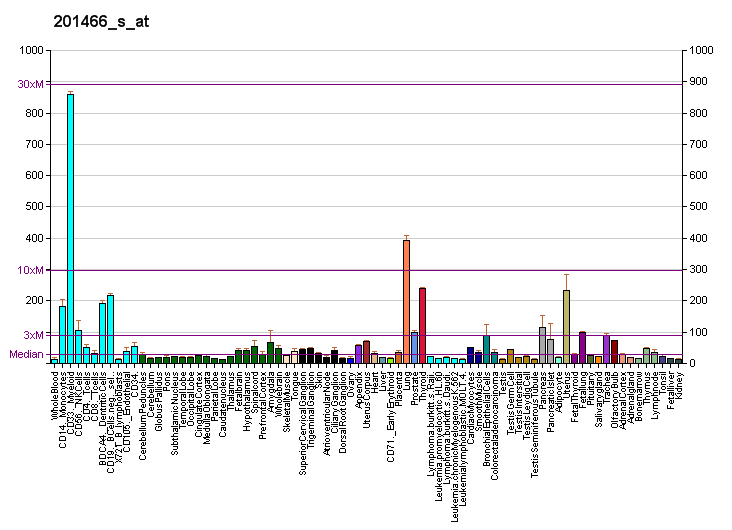

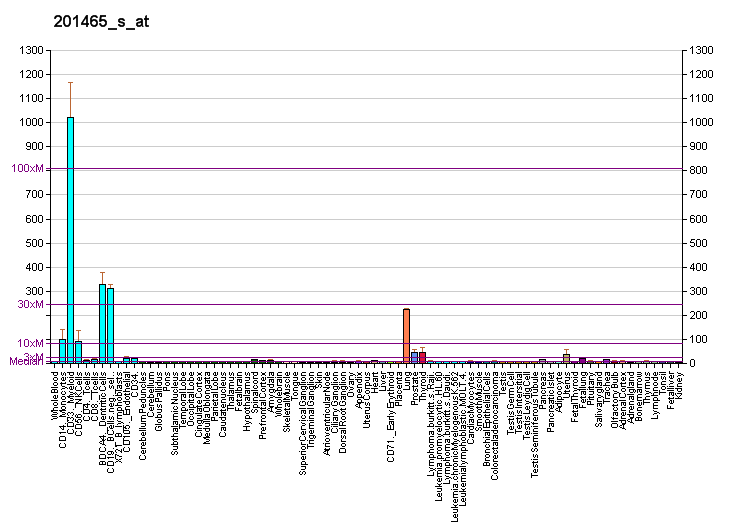

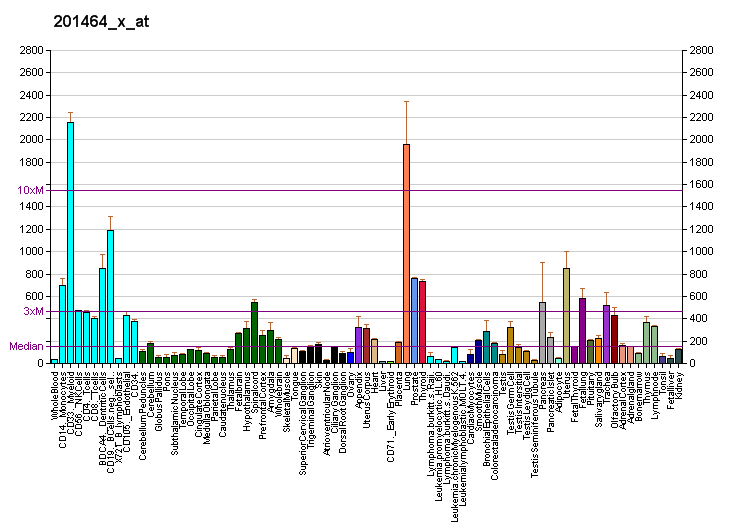
RNA expression pattern
Bgee	Human / Mouse (ortholog); Top expressed in: vena cava; gastric mucosa; cardia; lactiferous duct; saphenous vein; seminal vesicula; pericardium; parotid gland; endothelial cell; pylorus / Top expressed in: granulocyte; left lung lobe; dermis; right lung; decidua; medial head of gastrocnemius muscle; right lung lobe; ventricular zone; temporal muscle; aortic valve; More reference expression data
BioGPS	More reference expression data
Gene ontology
Molecular function	GTPase activator activity; DNA-binding transcription factor activity; DNA-binding transcription activator activity, RNA polymerase II-specific; DNA-binding transcription factor activity, RNA polymerase II-specific; cAMP response element binding; R-SMAD binding; HMG box domain binding; transcription factor binding; RNA polymerase II cis-regulatory region sequence-specific DNA binding; transcription factor activity, RNA polymerase II core promoter proximal region sequence-specific binding; enzyme binding; chromatin binding; protein binding; double-stranded DNA binding; DNA binding; sequence-specific DNA binding; transcription coactivator activity; identical protein binding; transcription factor activity, RNA polymerase II distal enhancer sequence-specific binding; RNA binding; protein homodimerization activity; protein heterodimerization activity; ubiquitin protein ligase binding; ubiquitin-like protein ligase binding; transcription cis-regulatory region binding
Cellular component	cytosol; transcription repressor complex; nucleus; nuclear chromosome; nucleoplasm; transcription regulator complex; transcription factor AP-1 complex
Biological process	negative regulation of neuron apoptotic process; negative regulation of DNA binding; outflow tract morphogenesis; transcription by RNA polymerase II; learning; monocyte differentiation; response to organic substance; leading edge cell differentiation; Fc-epsilon receptor signaling pathway; positive regulation of neuron apoptotic process; cellular response to hormone stimulus; regulation of DNA-binding transcription factor activity; circadian rhythm; angiogenesis; positive regulation of ERK1 and ERK2 cascade; Ras protein signal transduction; transforming growth factor beta receptor signaling pathway; negative regulation of cell population proliferation; response to muscle stretch; cellular response to calcium ion; response to cytokine; regulation of transcription, DNA-templated; SMAD protein signal transduction; axon regeneration; positive regulation of fibroblast proliferation; response to mechanical stimulus; positive regulation of epithelial cell migration; positive regulation of DNA-templated transcription, initiation; transcription, DNA-templated; positive regulation of cell differentiation; positive regulation of monocyte differentiation; positive regulation of pri-miRNA transcription by RNA polymerase II; negative regulation of protein autophosphorylation; membrane depolarization; negative regulation of apoptotic process; eyelid development in camera-type eye; microglial cell activation; positive regulation of DNA replication; response to lipopolysaccharide; response to radiation; response to cAMP; negative regulation of transcription, DNA-templated; response to hydrogen peroxide; positive regulation of smooth muscle cell proliferation; positive regulation of endothelial cell proliferation; response to organic cyclic compound; ageing; regulation of cell cycle; regulation of cell population proliferation; positive regulation of cell population proliferation; liver development; negative regulation of transcription from RNA polymerase II promoter in response to endoplasmic reticulum stress; cellular response to potassium ion starvation; cellular process or phenomenon; release of cytochrome c from mitochondria; positive regulation of transcription by RNA polymerase II; positive regulation of GTPase activity; cellular response to reactive oxygen species; positive regulation of apoptotic process; positive regulation of transcription, DNA-templated; cellular response to cadmium ion; negative regulation of transcription by RNA polymerase II; positive regulation of vascular associated smooth muscle cell proliferation
Sources:Amigo / QuickGO
Orthologs
Databases	NCBI: entry; OMA: entry
Species	Human	Mouse
Entrez	3725	16476
Ensembl	ENSG00000177606	ENSMUSG00000052684
UniProt	P05412	P05627
RefSeq (mRNA)	NM_002228	NM_010591
RefSeq (protein)	NP_002219	NP_034721
Location (UCSC)	Chr 1: 58.78 – 58.78 Mb	Chr 4: 94.94 – 94.94 Mb
PubMed search
- Wikidata
View/Edit Human	View/Edit Mouse

Transcription factor Jun, also known as c-Jun, is a protein that in humans is encoded by the JUN gene. c-Jun, in combination with protein c-Fos, forms the AP-1 early response transcription factor. It was first identified as the Fos-binding protein p39 and only later rediscovered as the product of the JUN gene. c-jun was the first oncogenic transcription factor discovered. The proto-oncogene c-Jun is the cellular homolog of the viral oncoprotein v-jun (P05411). The viral homolog v-jun was discovered in avian sarcoma virus 17 and was named for ju-nana, the Japanese word for 17. The human JUN encodes a protein that is highly similar to the viral protein, which interacts directly with specific target DNA sequences to regulate gene expression. This gene is intronless and is mapped to 1p32-p31, a chromosomal region involved in both translocations and deletions in human malignancies.

== Function ==
=== Regulation ===
Both Jun and its dimerization partners in AP-1 formation are subject to regulation by diverse extracellular stimuli, which include peptide growth factors, pro-inflammatory cytokines, oxidative and other forms of cellular stress, and UV irradiation. For example, UV irradiation is a potent inducer for elevated c-jun expression.

As with other immediate early genes, induction of c-jun transcription can occur using existing proteins in the cell, and it can be induced even when protein synthesis is blocked experimentally.

c-jun transcription is autoregulated by its own product, Jun. The binding of Jun (AP-1) to a high-affinity AP-1 binding site in the jun promoter region induces jun transcription. This positive autoregulation by stimulating its own transcription may be a mechanism for prolonging the signals from extracellular stimuli. This mechanism can have biological significance for the activity of c-jun in cancer.

Also, the c-jun activities can be regulated by the ERK pathway. Constitutively active ERK is found to increase c-jun transcription and stability through CREB and GSK3. This results in activated c-jun and its downstream targets such as RACK1 and cyclin D1. RACK1 can enhance JNK activity, and activated JNK signaling subsequently exerts regulation on c-jun activity.

It is activated through double phosphorylation by the JNK pathway but has also a phosphorylation-independent function. c-jun knockout is lethal, but transgenic animals with a mutated c-jun that cannot be phosphorylated (termed c-junAA) can survive.

Phosphorylation of Jun at serines 63 and 73 and threonine 91 and 93 increases transcription of the c-jun target genes. Therefore, regulation of c-jun activity can be achieved through N-terminal phosphorylation by the Jun N-terminal kinases (JNKs). It is shown that Jun's activity (AP-1 activity) in stress-induced apoptosis and cellular proliferation is regulated by its N-terminal phosphorylation. Another study showed that oncogenic transformation by ras and fos also requires Jun N-terminal phosphorylation at Serine 63 and 73.

=== Cell cycle progression ===
Studies have shown that c-jun is required for progression through the G1 phase of the cell cycle, and c-jun null cells show increased G1 arrest. C-jun regulates the transcriptional level of cyclin D1, which is a major Rb kinase. Rb is a growth suppressor, and it is inactivated by phosphorylation. Therefore, c-jun is required for maintaining sufficient cyclin D1 kinase activity and allowing cell cycle progression.

In cells absent of c-jun, the expression of p53 (cell cycle arrest inducer) and p21 (CDK inhibitor and p53 target gene) is increased, and those cells exhibit cell cycle defects. Overexpression of c-jun in cells results in decreased level of p53 and p21, and exhibits accelerated cell proliferation. C-jun represses p53 transcription by binding to a variant AP-1 site in the p53 promoter. Those results indicate that c-jun downregulates p53 to control cell cycle progression.

=== Anti-apoptotic activity ===
UV irradiation can activate c-jun expression and the JNK signaling pathway. C-jun protects cells from UV-induced apoptosis, and it cooperates with NF-κB to prevent apoptosis induced by TNFα. The protection from apoptosis by c-jun requires serines 63/73 (involved in phosphorylation of Jun), which is not required in c-jun-mediated G1 progress. This suggests that c-jun regulates cell cycle progression and apoptosis through two separated mechanisms.

A study utilized liver-specific inactivation of c-jun in hepatocellular carcinoma, which showed impaired tumor development correlated with increased level of p53 protein and the mRNA level of the p53 target gene noxa. Also, c-jun can protect hepatocytes from apoptosis, as hepatocytes lacking c-jun showed increased sensitivity to TNFα-induced apoptosis. In those hepatocytes lacking c-jun, deletion of p53 can restore resistance toward TNFα. Those results indicate that c-jun antagonizes the proapoptotic activity of p53 in liver tumor.

== Clinical significance ==
It is known that c-jun plays a role in cellular proliferation and apoptosis of the endometrium throughout the menstrual cycle. The cyclic change of the c-jun protein levels is significant in the proliferation and apoptosis of glandular epithelial cells. The persistent stromal expression of c-jun protein may prevent stromal cells from entering into apoptosis during the late secretory phase.

=== Cancer ===
In a study using non-small cell lung cancers (NSCLC), c-jun was found to be overexpressed in 31% of the cases in primary and metastatic lung tumors, whereas normal conducting airway and alveolar epithelia in general did not express c-jun.

A study with a group consisted of 103 cases of phase I/II invasive breast cancers showed that activated c-jun is expressed predominantly at the invasive front of breast cancer and is associated with proliferation and angiogenesis.

=== Tumor initiation ===
A study was done with liver-specific inactivation of c-jun at different stages of tumor development in mice with chemically induced hepatocellular carcinomas. The result indicates that c-jun is required at the early stage of tumor development, and deletion of c-jun can largely suppress tumor formation. Also, c-jun is required for tumor cell survival between the initiation and progression stages. In contrast to that, inactivation of c-jun in advanced tumors does not impair tumor progression.

=== Breast cancer ===
Overexpression of c-jun in MCF-7 cells can result in overall increased aggressiveness, as shown by increased cellular motility, increased expression of a matrix-degrading enzyme MMP-9, increased in vitro chemoinvasion, and tumor formation in nude mice in the absence of exogenous estrogens. The MCF-7 cells with c-jun overexpression became unresponsive to estrogen and tamoxifen, thus c-jun overexpression is proposed to lead to an estrogen-independent phenotype in breast cancer cells. The observed phenotype for MCF-7 cells with c-jun overexpression is similar to that observed clinically in advanced breast cancer, which had become hormone unresponsive.

The invasive phenotype contributed by c-jun overexpression is confirmed in another study. In addition, this study showed increased in vivo liver metastasis by the breast cancer with c-jun overexpression. There is also a study showing that dominant-negative c-Jun deficiency can inhibit in vivo bone metastasis in luminal-type breast cancer, and that c-Jun inhibitors may be a potential treatment for bone metastasis in breast cancer . These findings suggest that c-jun plays a critical role in the metastasis of breast cancer.

In mammary tumors, endogenous c-jun was found to play a key role in ErbB2-induced migration and invasion of mammary epithelial cells. Jun transcriptionally activates the promoters of SCF (stem cell factor) and CCL5. The induced SCF and CCL5 expression promotes a self-renewing mammary epithelial population. It suggests that c-jun mediates the expansion of breast cancer stem cells to enhance tumor invasiveness.

=== Vulvar cancer ===
C-jun has been observed overexpressed in vulvar squamous cell carcinoma samples, in association with hypermethylation-Induced inactivation of the RARB tumor suppressor gene. Indeed, mRNA levels of c-Jun tested higher in vulvar cancer samples when compared with those of normal skin and preneoplastic vulvar lesions, thus underscoring a cross-link between RARB gene and the oncogene c-Jun.

=== Cellular differentiation ===
Ten undifferentiated and highly aggressive sarcomas showed amplification of the jun gene and JUN overexpression at both RNA and protein levels. Overexpression of c-jun in 3T3-L1 cells (a preadipocytic non-tumoral cell line that resembles human liposarcoma) can block or delay adipocytic differentiation of those cells.

=== Nerve and spinal cord regeneration ===
Peripheral nerve injury in rodents rapidly activates JNK signaling which in turn activates c-Jun. In contrast, nerve injury in the central nervous system does not. c-Jun is sufficient to promote axon regeneration in both the peripheral and central nervous systems as overexpression in both dorsal root ganglion neurons and cortical neurons leads to increased regeneration.

== As anti-cancer drug target ==
Since c-jun has been observed overexpressed in cancer, several studies highlighted the hypothesis that this gene might be a target for cancer therapy. A study showed that oncogenic transformation by ras and fos requires Jun N-terminal phosphorylation at Serine 63 and 73 by the Jun N- terminal kinases (JNK). In this study, the induced skin tumor and osteosarcoma showed impaired development in mice with a mutant Jun incapable of N-terminal phosphorylation. Also, in a mouse model of intestinal cancer, genetic abrogation of Jun N-terminal phosphorylation or gut-specific c-jun inactivation attenuated cancer development and prolonged lifespan. Therefore, targeting the N-terminal phosphorylation of Jun (or the JNK signaling pathway) can be a potential strategy for inhibiting tumor growth.

In melanoma-derived B16-F10 cancer cells, c-jun inactivation by a pharmacological JNK/jun inhibitor SP combined with JunB knockdown can result in cytotoxic effect, leading to cell arrest and apoptosis. This anti-JunB /Jun strategy can increase the survival of mice inoculated with tumor cells, which suggests a potential antitumor strategy through Jun and JunB inhibition.

== Anti-cancer property of c-jun ==
Most research results show that c-jun contributes to tumor initiation and increased invasiveness. However, a few studies discovered some alternative activities of c-jun, suggesting that c-jun may actually be a double-edge sword in cancer.

=== p16 ===
p16^{INK4a} is a tumor suppressor and a cell cycle inhibitor, and a study shows that c-jun acts as “bodyguard” to p16^{INK4a} by preventing methylation of the p16^{INK4a} promoter. Therefore, c-jun can prevent silencing of the gene p16^{INK4a}.

=== Tylophorine ===
Tylophorine is a type of plant-derived alkaloid with anticancer activity by inducing cell cycle arrest. A study demonstrated that tylophorine treatment increased c-jun protein accumulation. Then c-jun expression in conjunction with tylophorine promotes G1 arrest in carcinoma cells through the downregulation of cyclin A2. Therefore, the result indicates that the anticancer mechanism of tylophorine is mediated through c-jun.

== Interactions ==
C-jun has been shown to interact with:

- ATF2
- AR
- ASCC3
- ATF3
- BCL3
- BCL6
- BRCA1
- C-Fos
- CSNK2A1
- COPS5
- CREBBP
- CSNK2A2
- DDX21,
- DDIT3
- ERG
- ETS2,
- FOSL1
- GTF2B
- MAPK8
- MyoD
- NACA
- NELFB
- NFE2L1
- NFE2L2
- NCOR2
- NCOA1
- PIN1
- RBM39
- RELA
- RB1
- RFWD2
- RUNX1
- RUNX2
- SMAD3
- STAT1
- STAT3
- TBP
- TGIF1

== See also ==
- c-Jun N-terminal kinases
