= Victoria Sanz-Moreno =

Spanish scientist

Victoria Sanz Moreno
- Born: London, England
- Other name: Vicky
- Education: University of Oviedo (BSc, Msci); University of Cantabria (PhD)
- Scientific career
- Workplaces: Institute of Cancer Research

Victoria Sanz Moreno is a Spanish scientist. She is professor of cancer cell and metastasis biology at The Institute of Cancer Research.

== Early life ==
Sanz-Moreno was born in London, England to an analytical chemist father and English teacher mother. Following completion of her father's postdoctoral studies her family moved back to Spain.

Sanz-Moreno studied chemistry and biochemistry at the University of Oviedo in Spain, receiving her master's in biochemistry. She obtained her PhD in chemical sciences in Piero Crespo's laboratory at the University of Cantabria.

== Career ==
After completing a short postdoc at the University of Cantabria, Sanz-Moreno was a CRUK and Marie Curie Intra-European Fellow with Professor Chris Marshall at the Institute of Cancer Research in London. Sanz-Moreno received a CRUK Career Development Fellowship in 2011 and founded an independent research group in the Randall Division of Cell and Molecular Biophysics at King's College London. In 2017 Sanz-Moreno received a CRUK Senior Fellowship. In 2018 she joined Barts Cancer Institute (Queen Mary University of London) as professor of cancer cell biology and funded by Barts Charity. In 2023, she joined the Institute of Cancer Research as Professor of Cancer Cell and Metastasis Biology. She leads the Cytoskeleton and Cancer Metastasis Team.

In 2014, Sanz-Moreno joined Cancer Research UK's Women of Influence initiative helping provide personal and career development support for female cancer research scientists.

=== Recognition ===
In 2008, Sanz-Moreno received the Applied Biosystems and EACR 40th Anniversary Research Award. Sanz-Moreno was shortlisted for the CRUK Communications and Brand Ambassador Prize (2015). In 2017, Sanz-Moreno received the 2017 BSCB Women in Cell Biology Early Career Medal. In 2019, Vicky received Distinguished Alumnus Award given by Colegio Inmaculada (Asturias) In 2021 she was elected to be a part of the Phone App "La Ruta de las Cientificas" together with other 8 female scientists. https://apps.apple.com/us/app/ruta-de-las-cient%C3%ADficas/id1571468626 In 2022, she received the VP Award for Research Excellence from QMUL Faculty of Medicine and Dentistry. In 2022, she received the Estela Medrano Memorial Award from the Society for Melanoma Research (SMR). https://www.bartscancer.london/grants-awards/2022/10/professor-victoria-sanz-moreno-recognised-for-major-contributions-in-the-fight-against-melanoma/ In 2022, she also received the Outstanding Contribution to Research Excellence Award at Barts Cancer Institute. In 2025, Sanz-Moreno was shortlisted for the Falling Walls Foundation Science Breakthrough of the Year in the Life Sciences Category https://falling-walls.com/science-summit/shortlist-2025 In 2025, Professor Victoria Sanz-Moreno was elected Fellow of the European Academy of Cancer Sciences and Fellow of the Royal Society of Biology (FRSB).
