= CSNK2A2 =

Protein-coding gene in humans

Identifiers
- Aliases: CSNK2A2, CK2A2, CSNK2A1, CK2alpha', casein kinase 2 alpha 2
- External IDs: OMIM: 115442; MGI: 88547; GeneCards: CSNK2A2
Available structures
PDB	Ortholog search: PDBe RCSB
PDB	List of PDB id codes 3E3B, 3OFM, 3U87
Enzyme activity
EC #	BRENDA	ExPASy	KEGG	MetaCyc
2.7.11.1	↗	↗	↗	↗

Gene location (Human)
Chr.	Chromosome 16 (human)
Band	16q21	Start	58,157,907 bp
Band	16q21	End	58,198,106 bp

Gene location (Mouse)
Chr.	Chromosome 8 (mouse)
Band	8 C5- D1|8 47.12 cM	Start	96,172,724 bp
Band	8 C5- D1|8 47.12 cM	End	96,216,667 bp
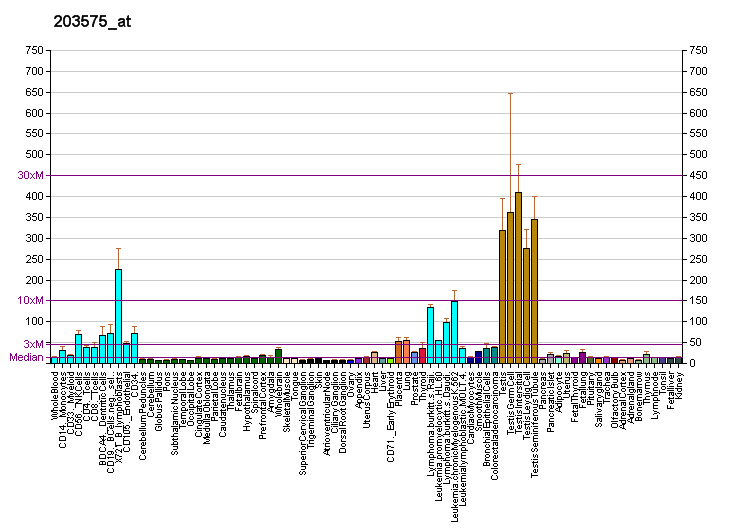
RNA expression pattern
Bgee	Human / Mouse (ortholog); Top expressed in: secondary oocyte; left testis; right testis; skin of leg; sperm; skin of thigh; skin of arm; skin of abdomen; body of pancreas; ganglionic eminence / Top expressed in: Rostral migratory stream; tail of embryo; spermatocyte; primary oocyte; zygote; epiblast; spermatid; genital tubercle; lip; internal carotid artery; More reference expression data
BioGPS	More reference expression data
Gene ontology
Molecular function	transferase activity; nucleotide binding; protein kinase activity; protein N-terminus binding; kinase activity; protein serine/threonine kinase activity; protein binding; ATP binding
Cellular component	cytosol; PcG protein complex; nucleoplasm; chromatin; acrosomal vesicle; nucleus; cytoplasm; plasma membrane
Biological process	regulation of transcription, DNA-templated; phosphorylation; positive regulation of protein targeting to mitochondrion; Wnt signaling pathway; transcription, DNA-templated; protein phosphorylation; regulation of autophagy of mitochondrion; cell cycle; apoptotic process; regulation of signal transduction by p53 class mediator; protein folding; phosphatidylcholine biosynthetic process; spermatogenesis; cerebral cortex development; liver regeneration; regulation of cell cycle; macroautophagy; regulation of chromosome separation
Sources:Amigo / QuickGO
Orthologs
Databases	NCBI: entry; OMA: entry
Species	Human	Mouse
Entrez	1459	13000
Ensembl	ENSG00000070770	ENSMUSG00000046707
UniProt	P19784	O54833
RefSeq (mRNA)	NM_001896	NM_009974
RefSeq (protein)	NP_001887	NP_034104
Location (UCSC)	Chr 16: 58.16 – 58.2 Mb	Chr 8: 96.17 – 96.22 Mb
PubMed search
- Wikidata
View/Edit Human	View/Edit Mouse

Casein kinase II subunit alpha' is an enzyme that in humans is encoded by the CSNK2A2 gene.

== Interactions ==
CSNK2A2 has been shown to interact with over 160 different substrates.

CSNK2A2 has been shown to interact with:

- Activating transcription factor 2,
- ATF1,
- C-Fos,
- CREB binding protein,
- CSNK2B,
- FGF1,
- Nucleolin,
- PIN1,
- PTEN, and
- RELA.
