= Metallothionein 2A =

Protein found in humans

MT2A
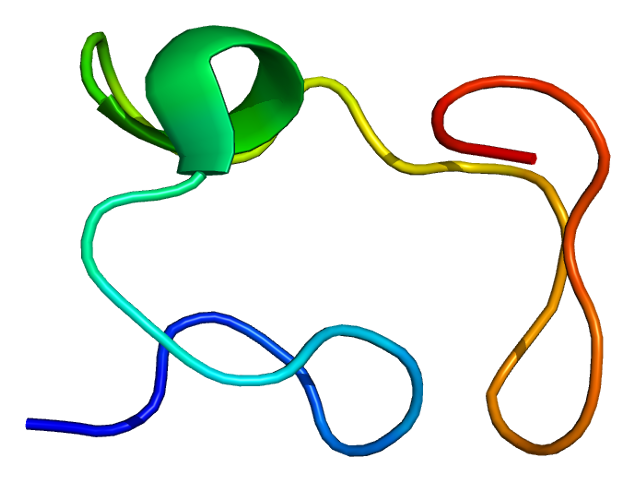
Available structures
PDB	Human UniProt search: PDBe RCSB
PDB	List of PDB id codes 1MHU, 2MHU

Identifiers
- Aliases: MT2A, MT2, Metallothionein 2A, MT-II, MT-2
- External IDs: OMIM: 156360; HomoloGene: 136536; GeneCards: MT2A; OMA:MT2A - orthologs

Gene location (Human)
Chr.	Chromosome 16 (human)
Band	16q13	Start	56,608,584 bp
Band	16q13	End	56,609,497 bp
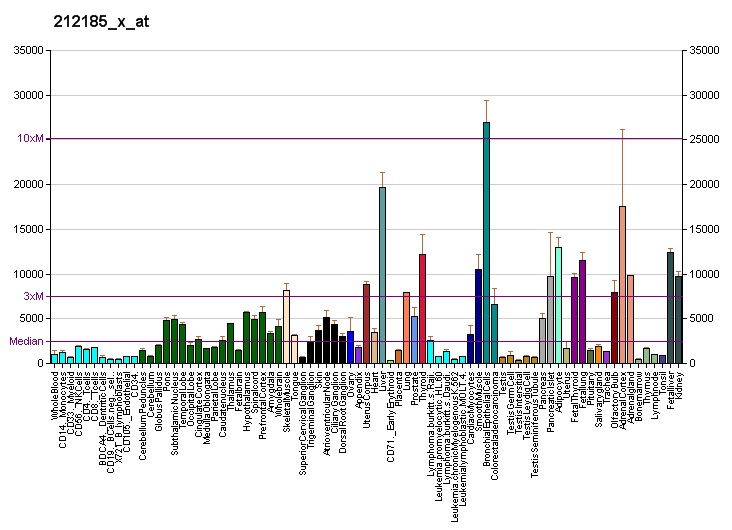
RNA expression pattern
Bgee	Human / Mouse (ortholog); Top expressed in: pericardium; right lobe of liver; olfactory bulb; mucosa of transverse colon; left uterine tube; external globus pallidus; cartilage tissue; right lobe of thyroid gland; upper lobe of left lung; Region I of hippocampus proper / n/a; More reference expression data
BioGPS	More reference expression data
Gene ontology
Molecular function	protein binding; metal ion binding; zinc ion binding
Cellular component	cytoplasm; perinuclear region of cytoplasm; cytosol; nucleus
Biological process	response to metal ion; cellular response to interleukin-3; cellular response to erythropoietin; negative regulation of growth; cellular response to zinc ion; interferon-gamma-mediated signaling pathway; cellular copper ion homeostasis; cellular zinc ion homeostasis; detoxification of copper ion; cellular response to cadmium ion; cellular response to copper ion; nitric oxide mediated signal transduction; response to bacterium
Sources:Amigo / QuickGO
Orthologs
Species	Human	Mouse
Entrez	4502	n/a
Ensembl	ENSG00000125148	n/a
UniProt	P02795	n/a
RefSeq (mRNA)	NM_005953	n/a
RefSeq (protein)	NP_005944	n/a
Location (UCSC)	Chr 16: 56.61 – 56.61 Mb	n/a
PubMed search		n/a
- Wikidata
View/Edit Human

Metallothionein-2 is a metallothionein protein that in humans is encoded by the MT2A gene.

The single-nucleotide polymorphism rs28366003 which substitutes guanine for adenine in MT2A is associated with certain cancers and some chronic diseases.

== Interactions ==
Metallothionein 2A has been shown to interact with protein kinase D1.
