= Protein c-Fos =

Mammalian protein found in Homo sapiens

FOS
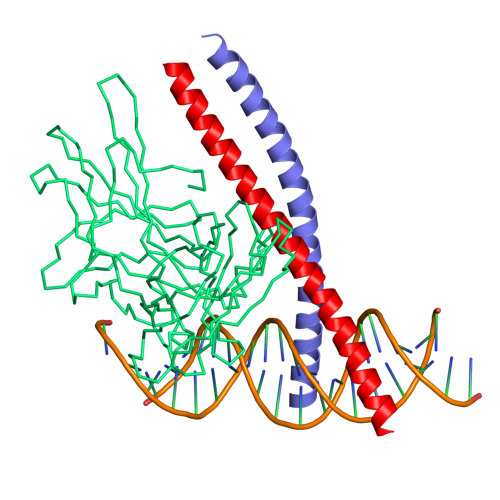

Identifiers
- Aliases: FOS, AP-1, C-p55, Fos proto-oncogene, AP-1 transcription factor subunit
- External IDs: OMIM: 164810; MGI: 95574; GeneCards: FOS
Available structures
| PDB | Ortholog search: PDBe RCSB |
| PDB | List of PDB id codes 1A02, 1FOS, 1S9K |

Gene location (Human)
| Chr. | Chromosome 14 (human) |
| Band | 14q24.3 | Start | 75,278,826 bp |
| Band | 14q24.3 | End | 75,282,230 bp |

Gene location (Mouse)
| Chr. | Chromosome 12 (mouse) |
| Band | 12 D2|12 39.7 cM | Start | 85,520,664 bp |
| Band | 12 D2|12 39.7 cM | End | 85,524,047 bp |
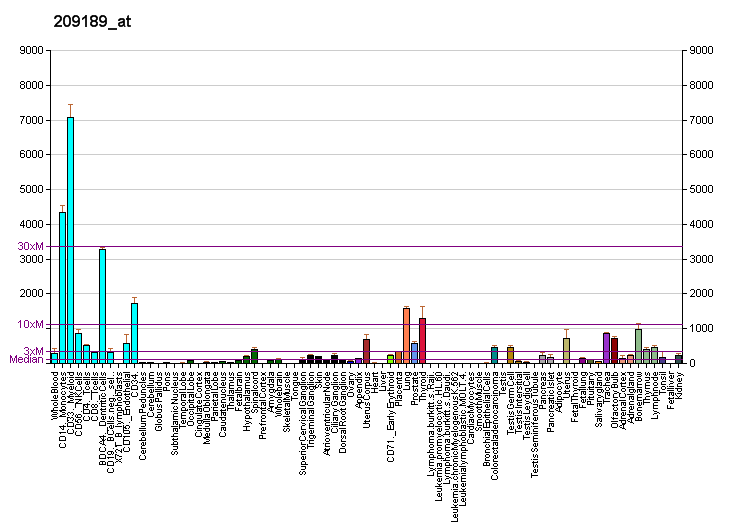
RNA expression pattern
| Bgee | Human / Mouse (ortholog); Top expressed in: gastric mucosa; skin of thigh; gallbladder; left uterine tube; monocyte; granulocyte; nipple; skin of hip; trachea; tibial nerve / Top expressed in: granulocyte; stroma of bone marrow; dermis; umbilical cord; pyloric antrum; decidua; left colon; cumulus cell; mucous cell of stomach; endothelial cell of lymphatic vessel; More reference expression data |
| BioGPS | More reference expression data |
Gene ontology
| Molecular function | DNA binding; sequence-specific DNA binding; R-SMAD binding; DNA-binding transcription factor activity; DNA-binding transcription activator activity, RNA polymerase II-specific; transcription factor binding; chromatin binding; protein binding; protein heterodimerization activity; double-stranded DNA binding; RNA polymerase II core promoter sequence-specific DNA binding; RNA polymerase II cis-regulatory region sequence-specific DNA binding; DNA-binding transcription factor activity, RNA polymerase II-specific |
| Cellular component | cytoplasm; cytosol; membrane; transcription regulator complex; nucleoplasm; endoplasmic reticulum; neuron projection; nucleus; protein-DNA complex; transcription factor AP-1 complex |
| Biological process | cellular response to extracellular stimulus; response to muscle stretch; response to immobilization stress; cellular response to calcium ion; response to cytokine; regulation of transcription, DNA-templated; SMAD protein signal transduction; response to organic cyclic compound; response to light stimulus; regulation of transcription by RNA polymerase II; response to progesterone; female pregnancy; response to corticosterone; response to mechanical stimulus; ageing; positive regulation of osteoclast differentiation; transcription by RNA polymerase II; nervous system development; cellular response to reactive oxygen species; response to gravity; Fc-epsilon receptor signaling pathway; positive regulation of transcription, DNA-templated; DNA methylation; response to lipopolysaccharide; sleep; cellular response to hormone stimulus; regulation of DNA-binding transcription factor activity; conditioned taste aversion; skeletal muscle cell differentiation; response to cold; response to cAMP; inflammatory response; transforming growth factor beta receptor signaling pathway; positive regulation of pri-miRNA transcription by RNA polymerase II; response to toxic substance; positive regulation of transcription by RNA polymerase II; regulation of gene expression; cytokine-mediated signaling pathway; cellular response to cadmium ion; positive regulation of neuron death |
Sources:Amigo / QuickGO
Orthologs
| Databases | NCBI: entry; OMA: entry |
| Species | Human | Mouse |
| Entrez | 2353 | 14281 |
| Ensembl | ENSG00000170345 | ENSMUSG00000021250 |
| UniProt | P01100; Q6FG41 | P01101 |
| RefSeq (mRNA) | NM_005252 | NM_010234 |
| RefSeq (protein) | NP_005243; NP_005243.1 | NP_034364 |
| Location (UCSC) | Chr 14: 75.28 – 75.28 Mb | Chr 12: 85.52 – 85.52 Mb |
| PubMed search |
- Wikidata
| View/Edit Human | View/Edit Mouse |

Protein c-Fos is a proto-oncogene and transcription factor that plays an important role in cellular function and human disease including cancer. It is encoded in humans by the FOS gene and frequently forms both homodimers and heterodimers.

When c-fos heterodimerizes with the transcription factor c-jun (from the Jun family), they form an AP-1 (Activator Protein-1) complex which binds DNA at specific sites to modulate gene expression.

c-Fos is a part of a bigger Fos family of transcription factors which includes c-Fos, FosB, Fra-1 and Fra-2. It plays an important role in many cellular functions and has been found to be overexpressed in a variety of cancers.

== History ==
It was first discovered in rat fibroblasts as the transforming gene of the FBJ MSV (Finkel–Biskis–Jinkins murine osteogenic sarcoma virus), a Gammaretrovirus.

== Structure and function ==
c-Fos is a 380 amino acid (62 kDa) protein with a basic leucine zipper region for dimerisation and DNA-binding and a transactivation domain at C-terminus, and, like Jun proteins, it can form homodimers. In vitro studies have shown that Jun–Fos heterodimers are more stable and have stronger DNA-binding activity than Jun–Jun homodimers.

C-Fos the human homolog of the retroviral oncogene v-fos. In humans, it has been mapped to chromosome region 14q21→q31.

A variety of stimuli, including serum, growth factors, tumor promoters, cytokines, and UV radiation induce their expression. The c-fos mRNA and protein is generally among the first to be expressed and hence referred to as an immediate early gene. It is rapidly and transiently induced, within 15 minutes of stimulation. Its activity is also regulated by posttranslational modification caused by phosphorylation by different kinases, like MAPK, CDC2, PKA or PKC which influence protein stability, DNA-binding activity and the trans-activating potential of the transcription factors. It can cause gene repression as well as gene activation, although different domains are believed to be involved in both processes.

It is involved in important cellular events, including cell proliferation, differentiation and survival; genes associated with hypoxia; and angiogenesis; which makes its dysregulation an important factor for cancer development. It can also induce a loss of cell polarity and epithelial-mesenchymal transition, leading to invasive and metastatic growth in mammary epithelial cells.

The importance of c-fos in biological context has been determined by eliminating endogenous function by using anti-sense mRNA, anti-c-fos antibodies, a ribozyme that cleaves c-fos mRNA or a dominant negative mutant of c-fos. The transgenic mice thus generated are viable, demonstrating that there are c-fos dependent and independent pathways of cell proliferation, but display a range of tissue-specific developmental defects, including osteoporosis, delayed gametogenesis, lymphopenia and behavioral abnormalities.

== Clinical significance ==
Signaling cascade in the nucleus accumbens that results in psychostimulant addiction
This diagram depicts the signaling events in the brain's reward center that are induced by chronic high-dose exposure to psychostimulants that increase the concentration of synaptic dopamine, like amphetamine, methamphetamine, and phenethylamine. Following presynaptic dopamine and glutamate co-release by such psychostimulants, postsynaptic receptors for these neurotransmitters trigger internal signaling events through a cAMP-dependent pathway and a calcium-dependent pathway that ultimately result in increased CREB phosphorylation. Phosphorylated CREB increases levels of ΔFosB, which in turn represses the c-Fos gene with the help of corepressors; c-Fos repression acts as a molecular switch that enables the accumulation of ΔFosB in the neuron. A highly stable (phosphorylated) form of ΔFosB, one that persists in neurons for 1–2 months, slowly accumulates following repeated high-dose exposure to stimulants through this process. ΔFosB functions as "one of the master control proteins" that produces addiction-related structural changes in the brain, and upon sufficient accumulation, with the help of its downstream targets (e.g., nuclear factor kappa B), it induces an addictive state.

The AP-1 complex has been implicated in transformation and progression of cancer. In osteosarcoma and endometrial carcinoma, c-Fos overexpression was associated with high-grade lesions and poor prognosis. Also, in a comparison between precancerous lesion of the cervix uteri and invasive cervical cancer, c-Fos expression was significantly lower in precancerous lesions. c-Fos has also been identified as independent predictor of decreased survival in breast cancer.

It was found that overexpression of c-fos from class I MHC promoter in transgenic mice leads to the formation of osteosarcomas due to increased proliferation of osteoblasts whereas ectopic expression of the other Jun and Fos proteins does not induce any malignant tumors. Activation of the c-Fos transgene in mice results in overexpression of cyclin D1, A and E in osteoblasts and chondrocytes, both in vitro and in vivo, which might contribute to the uncontrolled growth leading to tumor. Human osteosarcomas analyzed for c-fos expression have given positive results in more than half the cases and c-fos expression has been associated with higher frequency of relapse and poor response to chemotherapy.

Several studies have raised the idea that c-Fos may also have tumor-suppressor activity, that it might be able to promote as well as suppress tumorigenesis. Supporting this is the observation that in ovarian carcinomas, loss of c-Fos expression correlates with disease progression. This double action could be enabled by differential protein composition of tumour cells and their environment, for example, dimerisation partners, co-activators and promoter architecture. It is possible that the tumor suppressing activity is due to a proapoptotic function. The exact mechanism by which c-Fos contributes to apoptosis is not clearly understood, but observations in human hepatocellular carcinoma cells indicate that c-Fos is a mediator of c-myc-induced cell death and might induce apoptosis through the p38 MAP kinase pathway. Fas ligand (FASLG or FasL) and the tumour necrosis factor-related apoptosis-inducing ligand (TNFSF10 or TRAIL) might reflect an additional apoptotic mechanism induced by c-Fos, as observed in a human T-cell leukaemia cell line. Another possible mechanism of c-Fos involvement in tumour suppression could be the direct regulation of BRCA1, a well established factor in familial breast and ovarian cancer.

In addition, the role of c-fos and other Fos family proteins has also been studied in endometrial carcinoma, cervical cancer, mesotheliomas, colorectal cancer, lung cancer, melanomas, thyroid carcinomas, esophageal cancer, hepatocellular carcinomas, etc.

Cocaine, methamphetamine, morphine, and other psychoactive drugs have been shown to increase c-Fos production in the mesocortical pathway (prefrontal cortex) as well as in the mesolimbic reward pathway (nucleus accumbens), as well as display variability depending on prior sensitization. c-Fos repression by ΔFosB's AP-1 complex within the D1-type medium spiny neurons of the nucleus accumbens acts as a molecular switch that enables the chronic induction of ΔFosB, thus allowing it to accumulate more rapidly. As such, the c-Fos promoter finds utilization in drug addiction research in general, as well as with context-induced relapse to drug-seeking and other behavioral changes associated with chronic drug taking.

An increase in c-Fos production in androgen receptor-containing neurons has been observed in rats after mating.

== Applications ==
Expression of c-fos is an indirect marker of neuronal activity because c-fos is often expressed when neurons fire action potentials. Up-regulation of c-fos mRNA in a neuron is considered a marker for activity.

The c-fos promoter has also been utilized for drug abuse research. Scientists use this promoter to turn on transgenes in rats, allowing them to manipulate specific neuronal ensembles to assess their role in drug-related memories and behavior. TetTag mice have been created to reactivate or silence cFos-expressing neurons with optogenetic tools or with DREADDs.

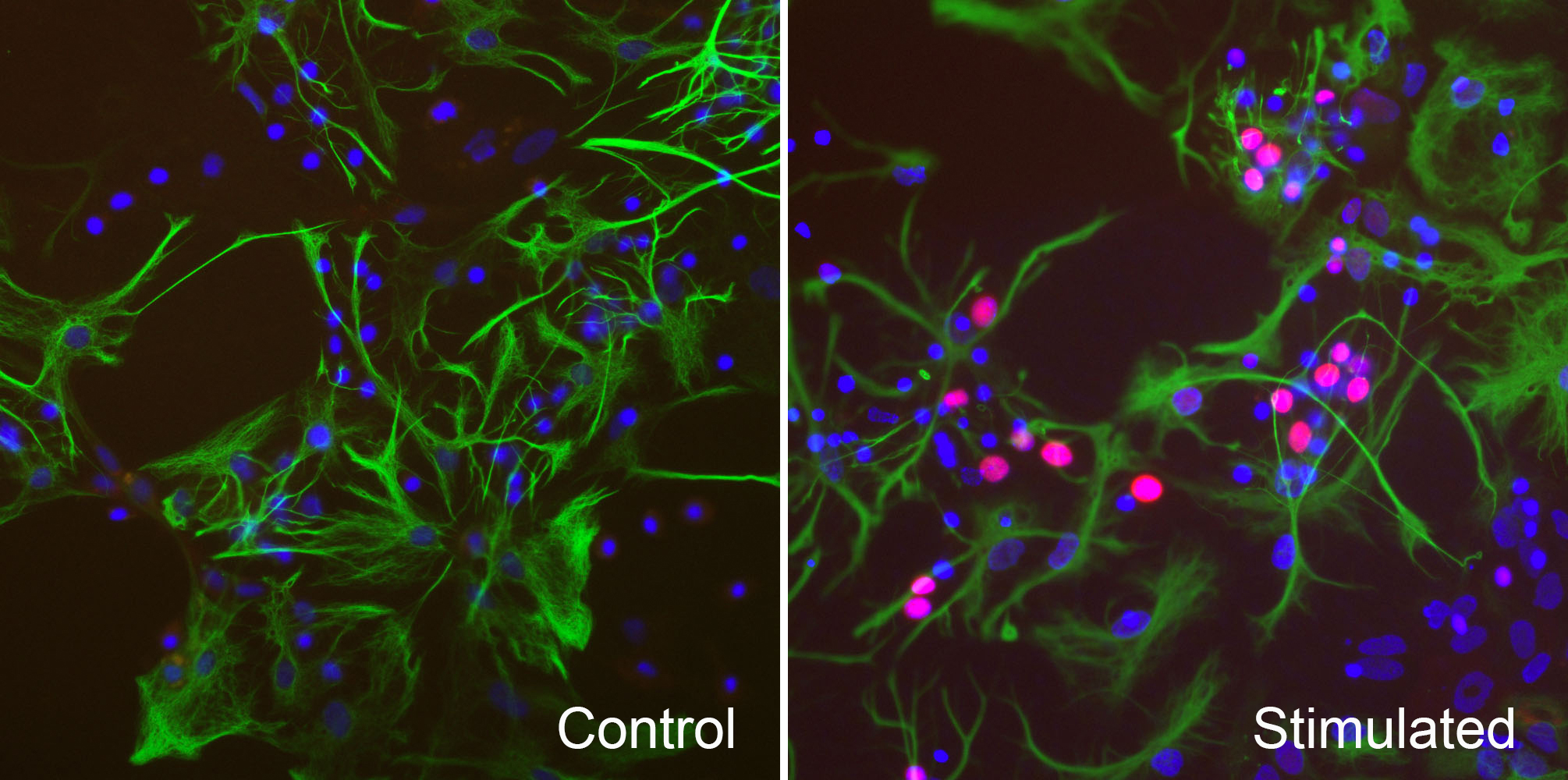
Mixed neural cultures derived from rat embryos were grown under normal conditions (left) or treated with 55mM Potassium for 5 hours (right). Cultures were then stained with antibody to the intermediate filament protein vimentin (green), antibody to cFos (red) and with a DNA binding dye (blue). The vimentin antibody reveals non-neuronal cells and the DNA dye shows the nuclei of all cells. The potassium treatment depolarizes the neurons and induces strong expression of cFos in neuronal cell bodies as shown in the right image. Cell culture, Image and antibody generation all performed in the EnCor Biotechnology laboratory.

== Interactions ==
c-Fos has been shown to interact with:

- BCL3,
- COBRA1,
- CSNK2A1,
- CSNK2A2,
- DDIT3,
- JUN
- NCOA1,
- NCOR2,
- RELA,
- RUNX1,
- RUNX2,
- SMAD3, and
- TBP.

== See also ==
- Leptomycin
- c-Jun
- Egr-1
