= AP-1 transcription factor =

Instance of defined set in Homo sapiens with Reactome ID (R-HSA-6806560)

AP-1 Proteins (Fos, ATF, JDP)

Identifiers
- Symbol: AP-1
- InterPro: IPR000837
Available protein structures:
- PDB: IPR000837
- AlphaFold: IPR000837

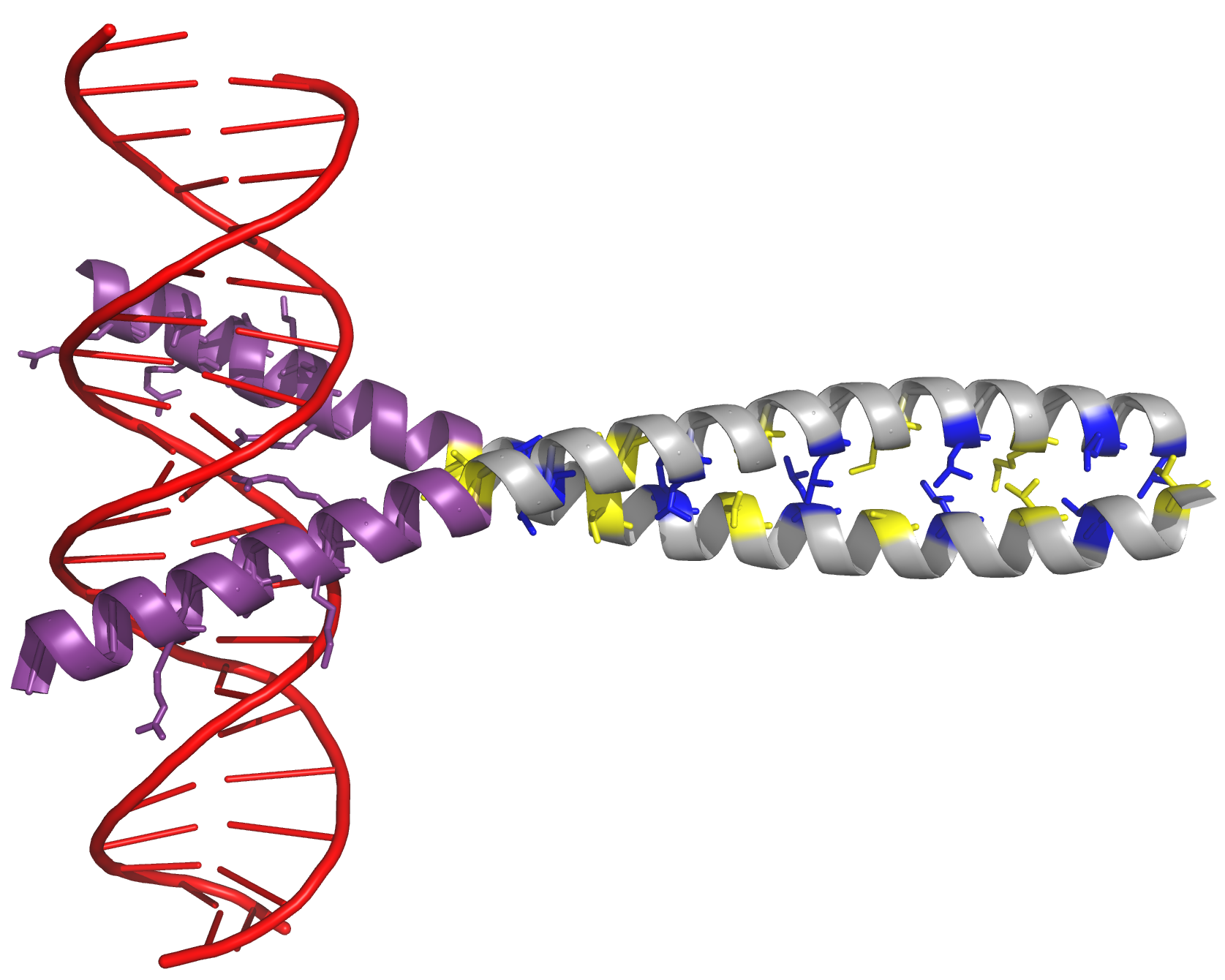
Crystal structure of c-Fos:c-Jun heterodimer and DNA complex (PDB: 1FOS). In the "Leucine zipper" domain (gray), the hydrophobic residues on c-Fos and hydrophobic residues on c-Jun pack together on the interface of the coiled-coil (leucines are colored in blue, and the other hydrophobic residues are colored in yellow). Residues from the "basic region" (purple) directly interact with the DNA (red).

Transcription factor Jun

Identifiers
- Symbol: Leuzip_Jun
- InterPro: IPR002112
Available protein structures:
- PDB: IPR002112
- AlphaFold: IPR002112

Activator protein 1 (AP-1) is a transcription factor that regulates gene expression in response to a variety of stimuli, including cytokines, growth factors, stress, and bacterial and viral infections. AP-1 controls a number of cellular processes including differentiation, proliferation, and apoptosis. The structure of AP-1 is a heterodimer composed of proteins belonging to the c-Fos, c-Jun, ATF and JDP families.

== History ==
AP-1 was first discovered as a TPA-activated transcription factor that bound to a cis-regulatory element of the human metallothionein IIa (hMTIIa) promoter and SV40. The AP-1 binding site was identified as the 12-O-Tetradecanoylphorbol-13-acetate (TPA) response element (TRE) with the consensus sequence 5'-TGA G/C TCA-3'. The AP-1 subunit Jun was identified as a novel oncoprotein of avian sarcoma virus, and Fos-associated p39 protein was identified as the transcript of the cellular Jun gene. Fos was first isolated as the cellular homologue of two viral v-fos oncogenes, both of which induce osteosarcoma in mice and rats. Since its discovery, AP-1 has been found to be associated with numerous regulatory and physiological processes, and new relationships are still being investigated.

== Structure ==
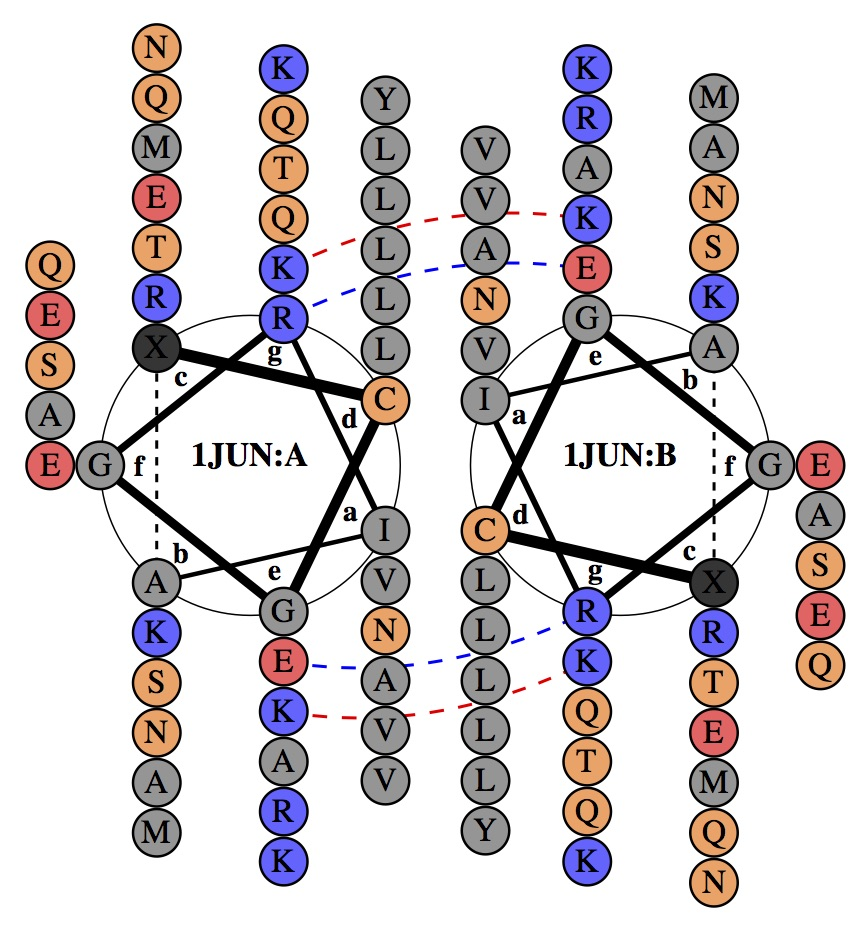
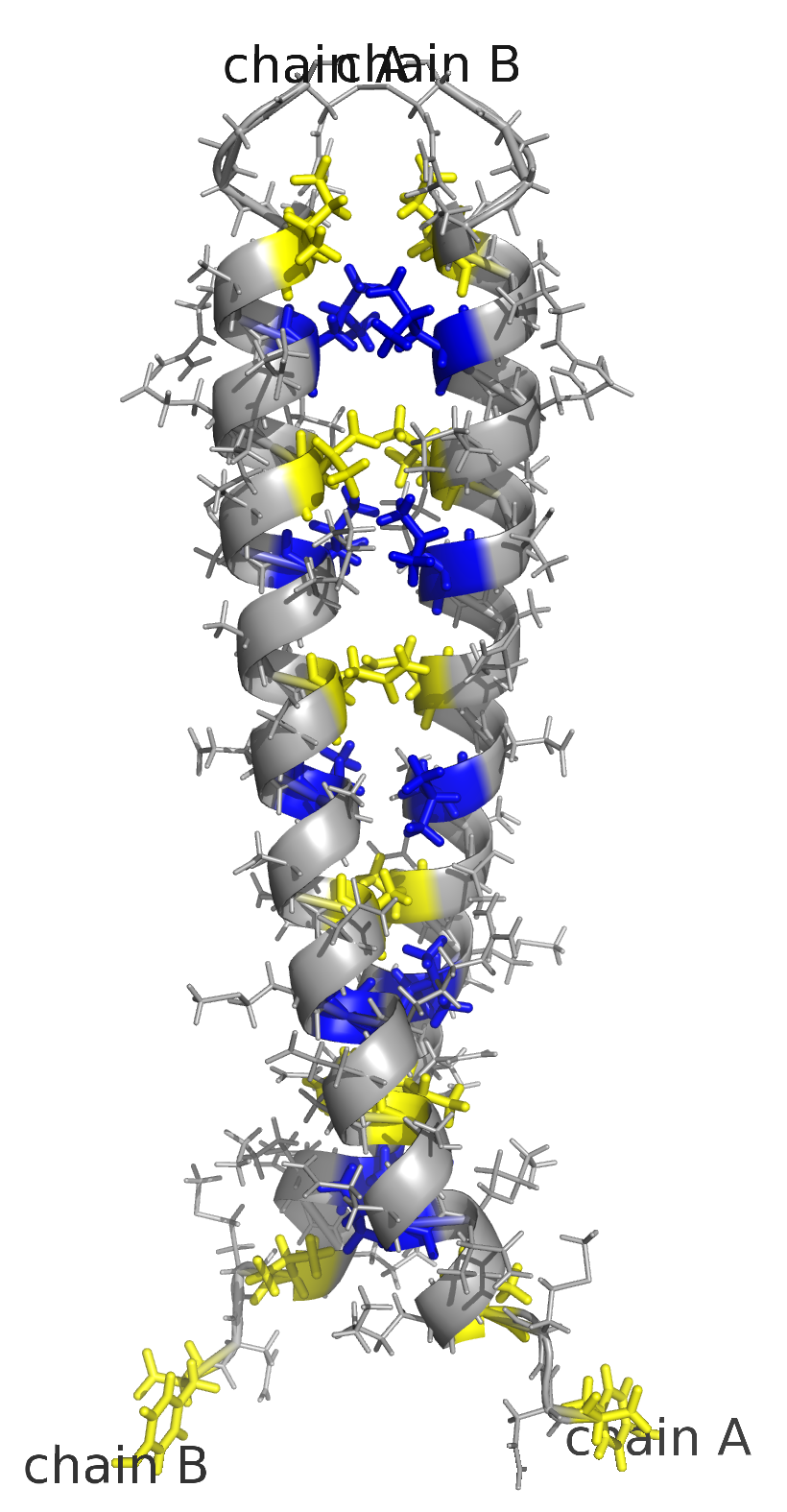
C-JUN homodimer (PDB: 1JUN) Left: The helical wheel projection of c-jun homodimer. When viewed down the axis, the alpha helices have a ~7 amino acid repeating leucine at position a. Two helices may be aligned so that repeating hydrophobic side chains (gray) form an interacting surface which facilitates dimerization. Dashed lines indicate potential electrostatic bridges. Right: Side view of c-jun homodimer. Residues on position a and d in helical wheel diagram are shown. Leucines are colored in blue, and other hydrophobic residues are colored in yellow.

AP-1 transcription factor is assembled through the dimerization of a characteristic bZIP domain (basic region leucine zipper) in the Fos and Jun subunits. A typical bZIP domain consists of a "leucine zipper" region, and a "basic region". The leucine zipper is responsible for dimerization of the Jun and Fos protein subunits. This structural motif twists two alpha helical protein domains into a "coiled coil," characterized by a periodicity of 3.5 residues per turn and repetitive leucines appearing at every seventh position of the polypeptide chain. Due to the amino acid sequence and the periodicity of the helices, the leucine side chains are arranged along one face of the α helix and form a hydrophobic surface that modulates dimerization. Hydrophobic residues additional to leucine also form the characteristic 3-4 repeat of α helices involved in "coiled-coil" interactions, and help contribute to the hydrophobic packing that drives dimerization. Together, this hydrophobic surface holds the two subunits together.

The basic region of the bZIP domain is just upstream to the leucine zipper, and contains positively charged residues. This region interacts with DNA target sites. Apart from the "leucine zipper" and the "basic region" which are important for dimerization and DNA-binding, the c-jun protein contains three short regions, which consist of clusters of negatively charged amino acids in its N-terminal half that are important for transcriptional activation in vivo.

Dimerization happens between the products of the c-jun and c-fos protooncogenes, and is required for DNA-binding. Jun proteins can form both homo and heterodimers and therefore are capable of binding to DNA by themselves. However, Fos proteins do not dimerize with each other and therefore can only bind to DNA when bound with Jun. The Jun-Fos heterodimer is more stable and has higher DNA-binding activity than Jun homodimers.

== Function ==
AP-1 transcription factor has been shown to have a hand in a wide range of cellular processes, including cell growth, differentiation, and apoptosis. AP-1 activity is often regulated via post-translational modifications, DNA binding dimer composition, and interaction with various binding partners. AP-1 transcription factors are also associated with numerous physiological functions especially in determination of organisms' life span and tissue regeneration. Below are some of the other important functions and biological roles AP-1 transcription factors have been shown to be involved in.

=== Cell growth, proliferation and senescence ===
The AP-1 transcription factor has been shown to play numerous roles in cell growth and proliferation. In particular, c-Fos and c-Jun seem to be major players in these processes. C-jun has been shown to be essential for fibroblast proliferation, and levels of both AP-1 subunits have been shown to be expressed above basal levels during cell division. C-fos has also been shown to increase in expression in response to the introduction of growth factors in the cell, further supporting its suggested involvement in the cell cycle. The growth factors TGF alpha, TGF beta, and IL2 have all been shown to stimulate c-Fos, and thereby stimulate cellular proliferation via AP-1 activation.

Cellular senescence has been identified as "a dynamic and reversible process regulated by (in)activation of a predetermined enhancer landscape controlled by the pioneer transcription factor AP-1", which "defines the organizational principles of the transcription factor network that drives the transcriptional programme of senescent cells".

=== Cellular differentiation ===
AP-1 transcription is deeply involved in the modulation of gene expression. Changes in cellular gene expression in the initiation of DNA synthesis and the formation of differentiated derivatives can lead to cellular differentiation. AP-1 has been shown to be involved in cell differentiation in several systems. For example, by forming stable heterodimers with c-Jun, the bZIP region of c-Fos increases the binding of c-Jun to target genes whose activation is involved in the differentiation of chicken embryo fibroblasts (CEF). It has also been shown to participate in endoderm specification.

=== Apoptosis ===
AP-1 transcription factor is associated with a broad range of apoptosis related interactions. AP-1 activity is induced by numerous extracellular matrix and genotoxic agents, suggesting involvement in programmed cell death. Many of these stimuli activate the c-Jun N-terminal kinases (JNKs) leading to the phosphorylation of Jun proteins and enhanced transcriptional activity of AP-1 dependent genes. Increases in the levels of Jun and Fos proteins and JNK activity have been reported in scenarios in which cells undergo apoptosis. For example, inactivated c-Jun-ER cells show a normal morphology, while c-Jun-ER activated cells have been shown to be apoptotic.

=== Tissue-specific regulation ===
It has been shown that AP-1 motif regulates tissue-specific genes through enhancer selection mechanism in fibroblasts. It has been shown that AP-1 motif is related to epigenetic regulation in kidney function and now there is suspect that AP-1 motif is regulated in developing RPE, specifically through OTX2.

== Regulation of AP-1 ==
Increased AP-1 levels lead to increased transactivation of target gene expression. Regulation of AP-1 activity is therefore critical for cell function and occurs through specific interactions controlled by dimer-composition, transcriptional and post-translational events, and interaction with accessory proteins.

AP-1 functions are heavily dependent on the specific Fos and Jun subunits contributing to AP-1 dimers. The outcome of AP-1 activation is dependent on the complex combinatorial patterns of AP-1 component dimers. The AP-1 complex binds to a palindromic DNA motif (5'-TGA G/C TCA-3') to regulate gene expression, but specificity is dependent on the dimer composition of the bZIP subunit.

== Physiological relevance ==
AP-1 transcription factor has been shown to be involved in skin physiology, specifically in tissue regeneration. The process of skin metabolism is initiated by signals that trigger undifferentiated proliferative cells to undergo cell differentiation. Therefore, activity of AP-1 subunits in response to extracellular signals may be modified under conditions where the balance of keratinocyte proliferation and differentiation has to be rapidly and temporally altered. The AP-1 transcription factor also has been shown to be involved in breast cancer cell growth through multiple mechanisms, including regulation of cyclin D1, E2F factors and their target genes. c-Jun, which is one of the AP-1 subunits, regulates the growth of breast cancer cells. Activated c-Jun is predominantly expressed at the invasive front in breast cancer and is associated with proliferation of breast cells. Due to the AP-1 regulatory functions in cancer cells, AP-1 modulation is studied as a potential strategy for cancer prevention and therapy.

== See also ==
- Activator protein
- Immediate early genes – Genes that are rapidly expressed in response to varied stimuli, without needing new proteins to be synthesized, including c-fos and c-jun
- Transcription factor
