= ZNF548 =

Protein-coding gene in the species Homo sapiens

Identifiers
- Aliases: ZNF548, zinc finger protein 548
- External IDs: GeneCards: ZNF548

Gene location (Human)
| Chr. | Chromosome 19 (human) |
| Band | 19q13.43 | Start | 57,389,850 bp |
| Band | 19q13.43 | End | 57,402,992 bp |
RNA expression pattern
| Bgee | Human / Mouse (ortholog); Top expressed in: gingival epithelium; buccal mucosa cell; superficial temporal artery; germinal epithelium; mucosa of paranasal sinus; cardia; lower lobe of lung; subthalamic nucleus; external globus pallidus; lateral nuclear group of thalamus / n/a; More reference expression data |
| BioGPS | n/a |
Gene ontology
| Molecular function | DNA binding; metal ion binding; nucleic acid binding; DNA-binding transcription factor activity, RNA polymerase II-specific |
| Cellular component | intracellular anatomical structure; nucleus |
| Biological process | transcription, DNA-templated; regulation of transcription, DNA-templated; regulation of transcription by RNA polymerase II |
Sources:Amigo / QuickGO
Orthologs
| Databases | NCBI: entry; OMA: entry |
| Species | Human | Mouse |
| Entrez | 147694 | n/a |
| Ensembl | ENSG00000188785 | n/a |
| UniProt | Q8NEK5 | n/a |
| RefSeq (mRNA) | NM_152909; NM_001172773 | n/a |
| RefSeq (protein) | NP_001166244; NP_690873 | n/a |
| Location (UCSC) | Chr 19: 57.39 – 57.4 Mb | n/a |
| PubMed search | | n/a |
- Wikidata
| View/Edit Human |

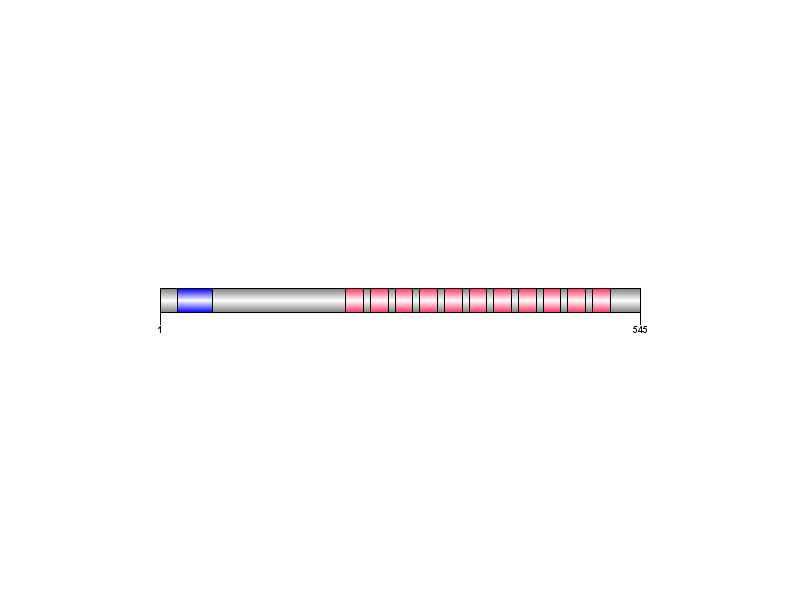
ZNF548 schematic illustration made with DOG 2.0. Blue represents the KRAB domain while pink represents the 11 zinc fingers found in the human ZNF548 protein that is 545 amino acids long.

Zinc Finger Protein 548 (ZNF548) is a human protein encoded by the ZNF548 gene which is located on chromosome 19. It is found in the nucleus and is hypothesized to play a role in the regulation of transcription by RNA Polymerase II. It belongs to the Krüppel C2H2-type zinc-finger protein family as it contains many zinc-finger repeats.

== Gene ==
This protein coding gene is 4987 bp long and encodes transcript variant 1 which is the longest ZNF548 isoform. It is found on chromosome 19; its exact position is 19q13.43 in the plus strand. The gene has 4 exons which encode for a Kruppel associated box (KRAB domain) and 11 zinc finger repeats.

=== Promoter ===
The promoter of the ZNF548 gene is 1198 bases long and is located at 57388850 - 57390047 on chromosome 19. The promoter region is conserved in 6 orthologs: Macaca mulatta (rhesus monkey), Pan troglodytes (chimpanzee), Oryctolagus cuniculus (European rabbit), Equus caballus (horse), Canis lupus familiaris (dog) and Sus scrofa (pig).

== Transcript ==
Conceptual translation of the Human ZNF548 isoform 1 protein. DNA sequence at the beginning is the 5' UTR while DNA sequence at the end is the 3' UTR. Below the DNA sequence the amino acids encoded by each codon are shown. Annotations in the figure include: an upstream in-frame stop, start and stop codons, exon boundaries, amino acids missing in ZNF548 isoform 2, the KRAB domain, the 11 zinc fingers which are also annotated as internal repeats, zinc finger double domains, zinc binding sites, putative nucleic acid binding sites, poly-A signals and poly-A sites.

Transcript variant 1 is the longest transcript and encodes the longest protein isoform (ZNF548 isoform 1) which is 545 amino acids long. Transcript variant 2 is missing exon 2 and encodes ZNF548 isoform 2 which is 533 amino acids long.

== Protein ==
ZNF548 belongs to the Kruppel C2H2-type zinc finger protein family as it contains 11 Cys2His2-type zinc finger repeats. Each zinc finger has a conserved ββα structure where a zinc atom is fixed by C2H2 residues. ZNF548 is able to attach to the DNA at a 44 bp long sequence through its C2H2 Zn motifs, each binding to 4 DNA bases. The protein also contains a Kruppel-associated box (KRAB) which is a domain found at the N terminus and contains multiple charged amino acids. This domain plays a role in transcription; it binds to the RING-B box-coiled coil (RBCC) domain of the KAP-1/TIF1-beta co-repressor.

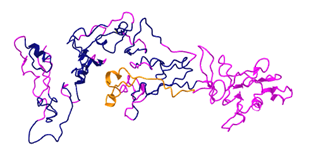
ZNF548 tertiary structure predicted by I-Tasser. The structure was edited in iCn3D so the orange color represents the KRAB domain while blue represents the 11 zinc fingers found in the human ZNF548 protein.

Tertiary structure of ZNF548 was predicted using I-Tasser.

ZNF548 has a molecular weight of 64 kDa and a predicted isoelectric point of 8.21. Compositional analysis of ZNF548 revealed that Alanine was found at a lower percentage than expected while Histidine was found at a much higher percentage than expected in the human ZNF548.

=== Subcellular expression ===
The protein is found in the nucleus and could also be detected in the cytoplasm or the mitochondria.

=== Tissue expression ===
ZNF548 expression in humans is relatively low compared to other proteins. It has low tissue specificity; it is expressed and detected in all human tissues.

=== Interactions with other proteins ===
Interaction of the human ZNF548 protein with the Nuclear distribution protein nudE-like 1 (NDEL1) and the Disrupted in schizophrenia 1 (DISC1) proteins has been experimentally validated using the two hybrid fragment pooling approach. Leucine rich repeat containing 36 (LRRC36), Myotubularin 1 (MTM1), Myotubularin related protein 4 (MTMR4) and RNA binding motif protein 39 (RBM39) have also been detected to interact with the ZNF548 protein through Affinity Capture-Mass Spectrometry.

=== Function ===
ZNF548 has been associated with gene expression as it can bind to nucleic acids as well as zinc ions. Based on the function of other KRAB-ZNF proteins it is hypothesized that it plays a role in the regulation of transcription of protein-encoding genes transcribed by RNA Polymerase II. Specifically it is a DNA-binding transcription factor that enhances or inhibits the transcription of certain genes that are transcribed by RNA Polymerase II. It has the ability to bind to a transcription factor recognition sequence that is on the same strand (cis) as the transcription start site via its zinc-fingers and become part of the KRAB-ZNF/KAP complex in the nucleoplasm. KRAB-ZNF proteins are known to be repressors. Therefore, when a KRAB-ZNF protein, such as ZNF548, is bound to DNA and simultaneously binds to the KAP1 co-repressor through its KRAB domain, various enzymes, such as histone deacetylases, histone methyltransferases and heterochromatin proteins, are recruited in order to compact the chromatin structure and consequently prevent transcription.

== Homologs ==
=== Orthologs ===
Orthologs of the ZNF548 protein have been found conserved across different orders of mammals only. This is line with the fact that C2H2-like fold groups are very common in mammalian transcription factors.

The KRAB domain as well as the zinc finger repeats are highly conserved across orthologs.

ZNF548 Ortholog table
| Genus, Species | Common name | Order | Estimated divergence date (MYA) | Accession number | Sequence length (aa) | Sequence similarity to human protein (%) |
|---|---|---|---|---|---|---|
| Homo sapiens | Human | Primates | 0 | NP_001166244.1 | 545 | 100 |
| Pan troglodytes | Chimpanzee | Primates | 6.7 | XP_003316775.1 | 545 | 99.3 |
| Rhinopithecus roxellana | Golden snub-nosed monkey | Primates | 29.44 | XP_010385311.1 | 545 | 97.8 |
| Cercocebus atys | Sooty mangabey | Primates | 29.44 | XP_011931548.1 | 545 | 97.6 |
| Trachypithecus francoisi | François' langur | Primates | 29.44 | XP_033080506.1 | 545 | 97.8 |
| Oryctolagus cuniculus | European rabbit | Lagomorpha | 90 | XP_017193400.1 | 532 | 84.2 |
| Marmota monax | Groundhog | Rodentia | 90 | KAF7471703.1 | 546 | 84.9 |
| Ictidomys tridecemlineatus | Thirteen-lined ground squirrel | Rodentia | 90 | XP_013221367.2 | 546 | 84.9 |
| Octodon degus | Common degu | Rodentia | 90 | XP_012368689.1 | 548 | 81.1 |
| Castor canadensis | North American beaver | Rodentia | 90 | XP_020025721.1 | 545 | 76 |
| Heterocephalus glaber | Naked mole-rat | Rodentia | 90 | XP_012921729.1 | 599 | 77.1 |
| Enhydra lutris kenyoni | Sea otter | Carnivora | 96 | XP_022347780.1 | 583 | 76 |
| Leptonychotes weddellii | Weddell seal | Carnivora | 96 | XP_030883405.1 | 634 | 66.4 |
| Ailuropoda melanoleuca | Giant panda | Carnivora | 96 | XP_034495390.1 | 630 | 65.6 |
| Equus przewalskii | Przewalski's horse | Perissodactyla | 96 | XP_008522443.1 | 579 | 71.4 |
| Ceratotherium simum simum | Southern white rhinoceros | Perissodactyla | 96 | XP_014649872.1 | 578 | 71.1 |
| Physeter catodon | Sperm whale | Artiodactyla | 96 | XP_023972760.1 | 589 | 72.5 |
| Balaenoptera musculus | Blue whale | Artiodactyla | 96 | XP_036688369.1 | 592 | 72.3 |
| Lipotes vexillifer | Baiji | Artiodactyla | 96 | XP_007457531.1 | 582 | 72.1 |
| Bos taurus | Cattle | Artiodactyla | 96 | NP_001193737.1 | 581 | 70.3 |
| Pteropus alecto | Black flying fox | Chiroptera | 96 | XP_024905354.1 | 678 | 64.1 |

=== Paralogs ===
ZNF548 has 25 paralogous proteins in human as seen in the table below.

ZNF548 Paralog Table
| Protein name | Accession number | Sequence similarity to human ZNF548 protein (%) |
|---|---|---|
| ZNF548 | NP_001166244.1 | 100 |
| ZIK1 | NP_001010879.2 | 57.6 |
| ZNF792 | NP_787068.3 | 56.2 |
| ZNF419 | NP_001091961.1 | 56.2 |
| ZNF154 | NP_001078853.1 | 55.3 |
| ZNF256 | NP_005764.2 | 54.7 |
| ZNF549 | NP_001186224.2 | 52.9 |
| ZNF586 | NP_060122.2 | 52.7 |
| ZNF773 | NP_940944.1 | 52.2 |
| ZNF418 | NP_001303956.1 | 51.6 |
| ZNF480 | NP_653285.2 | 51.6 |
| ZNF551 | NP_612356.2 | 50.7 |
| ZNF304 | NP_001277247.1 | 50.3 |
| ZNF583 | NP_001153332.1 | 49.2 |
| ZNF570 | NP_001287922.1 | 48.9 |
| ZNF772 | NP_001019767.1 | 48.6 |
| ZNF587B | NP_001363152.1 | 48.6 |
| ZNF79 | NP_009066.2 | 48.4 |
| ZNF8 | NP_066575.2 | 46.4 |
| ZNF584 | NP_775819.1 | 46 |
| ZNF561 | NP_689502.2 | 45.8 |
| ZNF552 | NP_079038.2 | 43 |
| ZNF610 | NP_001154897.1 | 42.6 |
| ZNF793 | NP_001013681.2 | 41.7 |
| ZNF562 | NP_001123503.1 | 41 |
| ZNF691 | NP_001229668.1 | 31.5 |

== Clinical Significance ==
ZNF548 was identified as a gene in meta-virus signature (MVS) which can be used to distinguish individuals with viral infections from those with bacterial infections as well as from healthy individuals.

ZNF548 microRNA expression can act as a marker to diagnose ovarian cancer. ZNF548 blood gene expression biomarker can also be used as a marker for suicidality.
