= Seckel syndrome =

- Other names: Harper's syndrome
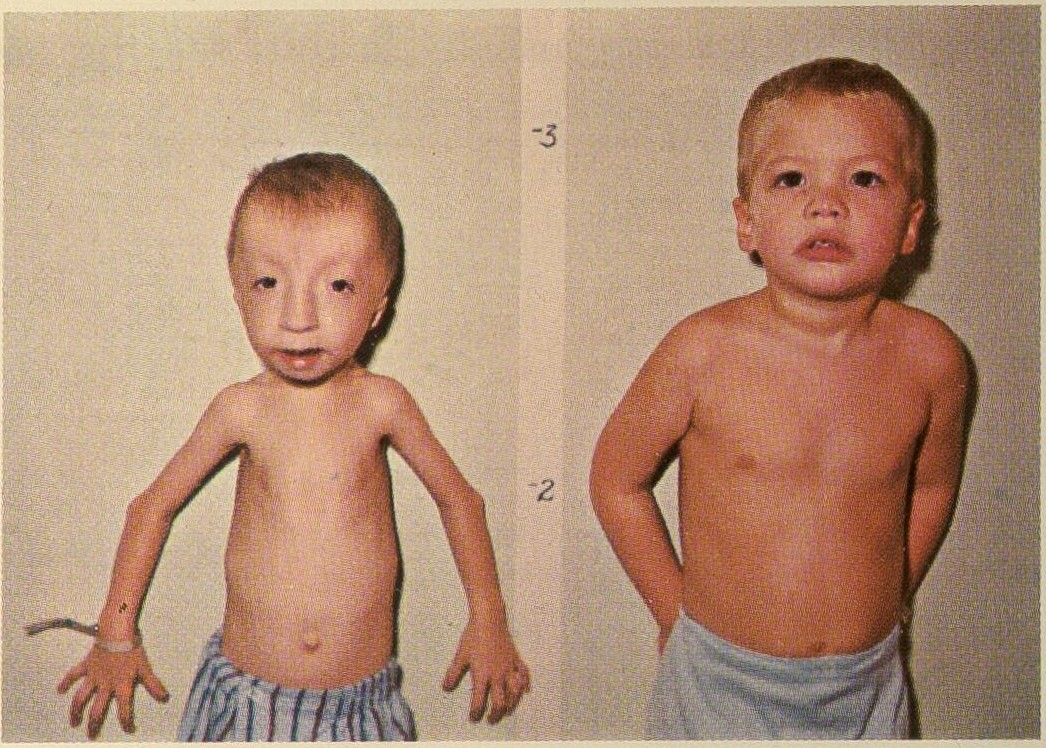
- Boy with Seckel syndrome (left)
- Specialty: Medical genetics
- Causes: defects of genes on chromosome 3 and 18.
- Frequency: 0.03%

Seckel syndrome, or microcephalic primordial dwarfism (also known as bird-headed dwarfism, Harper's syndrome, Virchow–Seckel dwarfism and bird-headed dwarf of Seckel) is an extremely rare congenital nanosomic disorder. Inheritance is autosomal recessive. It is characterized by intrauterine growth restriction and postnatal dwarfism with a small head, narrow bird-like face with a beak-like nose, large eyes with down-slanting palpebral fissures, receding mandible and intellectual disability.

A mouse model has been developed. This mouse model is characterized by a severe deficiency of ATR protein. These mice have high levels of replicative stress and DNA damage. Adult Seckel mice display accelerated aging. These findings are consistent with the DNA damage theory of aging.

== Symptoms and signs ==
Symptoms include:

- intellectual disability (more than half of the patients have an IQ below 50)
- microcephaly
- sometimes pancytopenia (low blood counts)
- cryptorchidism in males
- low birth weight
- dislocations of pelvis and elbow
- unusually large eyes
- blindness or visual impairment
- large, low-set ears
- small chin due to receded lower jaw

== Genetics ==
It is believed to be caused by defects of genes on chromosome 3 and 18. One form of Seckel syndrome can be caused by mutation in the gene encoding the ataxia telangiectasia and Rad3-related protein (ATR) which maps to chromosome 3q22.1–q24. This gene is central in the cell's DNA damage response and repair mechanism.

Types include:

Type	OMIM	Gene	Locus
SCKL1	210600	ATR	3q23
SCKL2	606744	RBBP8	18q11
SCKL4	613676	CENPJ	13q12
SCKL5	613823	CEP152	15q21.1
SCKL6	614728	CEP63	3q22.2
SCKL7	614851	NIN	14q22.1
SCKL8	615807	DNA2	10q21.3
SCKL9	616777	TRAIP	3p21.31
SCKL10	617253	NSMCE2	8q24.13
SCKL11	620767	CEP295	11q21

== Diagnosis ==
There are 4 criteria for diagnosis:

1. Congenital Dwarfism and postnatal growth retardation
2. Microcephaly, large eyes, beak-like nose, narrow face, retrognathism, malocclusion
3. Mental handicap
4. Agenesis of the corpus callosum, cerebral cysts

Other abnormalities can be a supportive criteria, such as: anemia, pancytopenia, cleft lip/palate scoliosis or kyphoscoliosis.

Genetic testing can confirm diagnosis.

== Treatment ==
There is no cure for Seckel syndrome. Symptomatic treatment is available.

== History ==
The syndrome was named after German–American physician Helmut Paul George Seckel (1900–1960). The synonym Harper's syndrome was named after pediatrician Rita G. Harper.

== See also ==
- Koo-Koo the Bird Girl
