= THOP1 =

Protein-coding gene in the species Homo sapiens

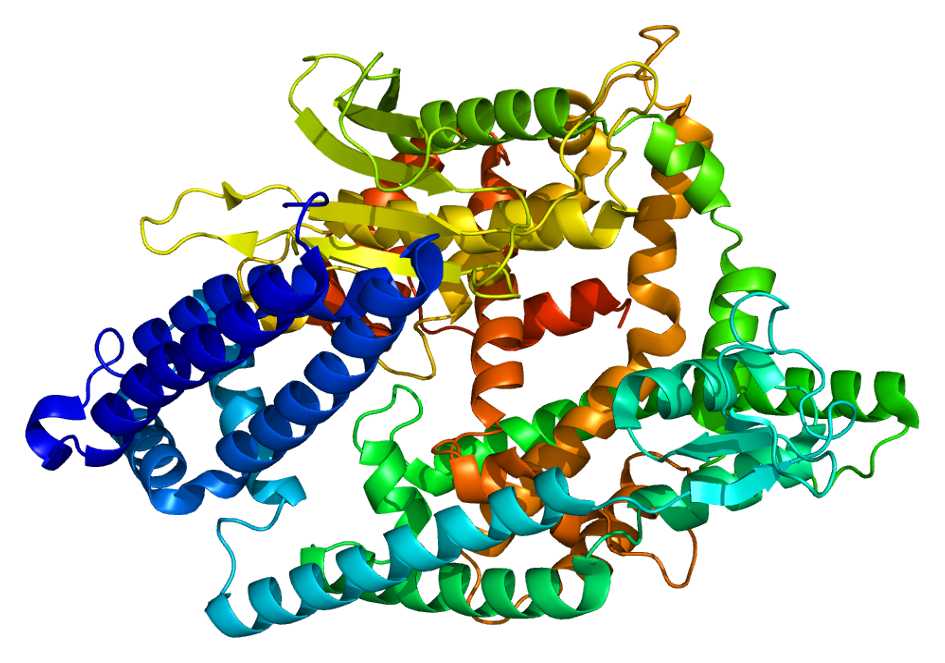

Identifiers
- Aliases: THOP1, EP24.15, MEPD_HUMAN, MP78, TOP, thimet oligopeptidase 1
- External IDs: OMIM: 601117; MGI: 1354165; GeneCards: THOP1
Available structures
PDB	Ortholog search: PDBe RCSB
PDB	List of PDB id codes 1S4B, 2O36
Enzyme activity
EC #	BRENDA	ExPASy	KEGG	MetaCyc
3.4.24.15	↗	↗	↗	↗

Gene location (Human)
Chr.	Chromosome 19 (human)
Band	19p13.3	Start	2,785,503 bp
Band	19p13.3	End	2,815,807 bp

Gene location (Mouse)
Chr.	Chromosome 10 (mouse)
Band	10 C1|10 39.72 cM	Start	80,905,869 bp
Band	10 C1|10 39.72 cM	End	80,918,393 bp
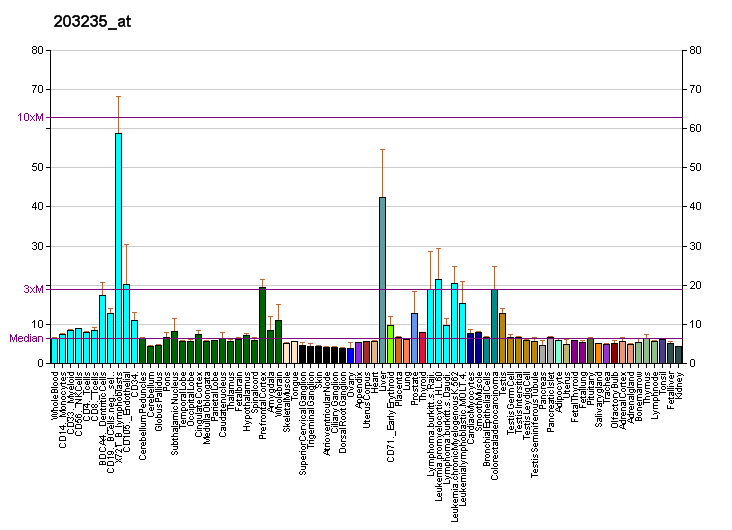
RNA expression pattern
Bgee	Human / Mouse (ortholog); Top expressed in: left testis; right testis; right hemisphere of cerebellum; right frontal lobe; ventricular zone; right lobe of liver; apex of heart; anterior pituitary; muscle of thigh; mucosa of transverse colon / Top expressed in: spermatid; spermatocyte; esophagus; seminiferous tubule; lip; epiblast; tail of embryo; internal carotid artery; embryo; genital tubercle; More reference expression data
BioGPS	More reference expression data
Gene ontology
Molecular function	peptide binding; peptidase activity; hydrolase activity; metallopeptidase activity; metal ion binding; metalloendopeptidase activity
Cellular component	cytoplasm; mitochondrial intermembrane space; cytosol
Biological process	proteolysis; peptide metabolic process; protein polyubiquitination
Sources:Amigo / QuickGO
Orthologs
Databases	NCBI: entry; OMA: entry
Species	Human	Mouse
Entrez	7064	50492
Ensembl	ENSG00000172009	ENSMUSG00000004929
UniProt	P52888	Q8C1A5
RefSeq (mRNA)	NM_003249	NM_022653
RefSeq (protein)	NP_003240	NP_073144
Location (UCSC)	Chr 19: 2.79 – 2.82 Mb	Chr 10: 80.91 – 80.92 Mb
PubMed search
- Wikidata
View/Edit Human	View/Edit Mouse

Thimet oligopeptidase is an enzyme that in humans is encoded by the THOP1 gene.
