= PTP4A1 =

Protein-coding gene in the species Homo sapiens

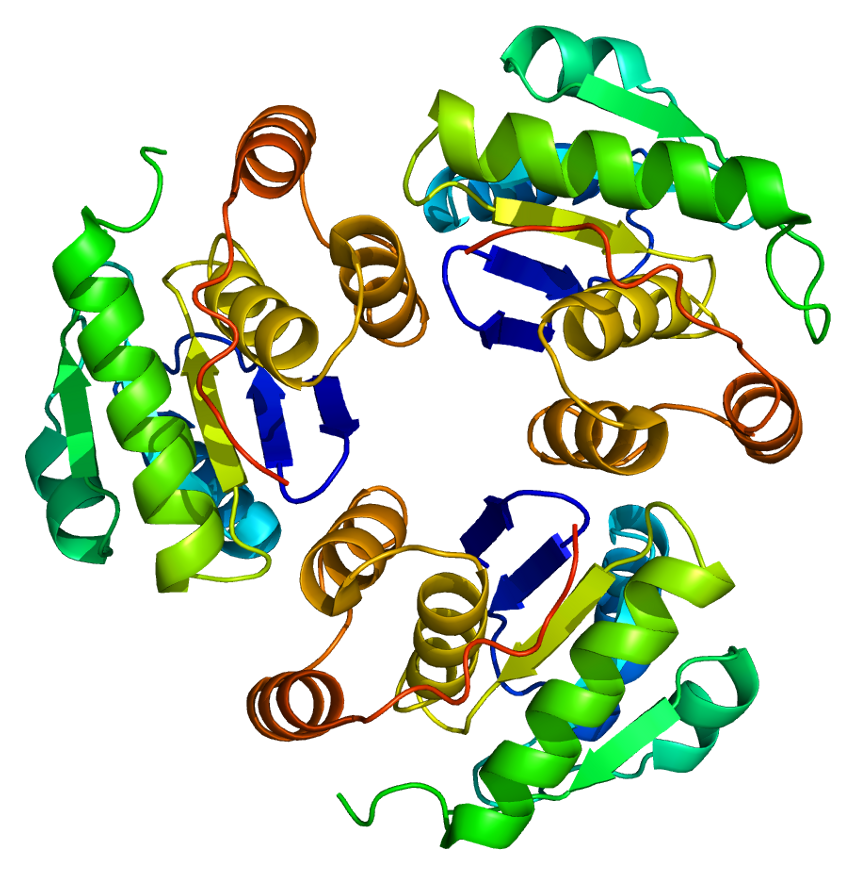

Identifiers
- Aliases: PTP4A1, HH72, PRL-1, PRL1, PTP(CAAX1), PTPCAAX1, protein tyrosine phosphatase type IVA, member 1, protein tyrosine phosphatase 4A1
- External IDs: OMIM: 601585; MGI: 1277096; GeneCards: PTP4A1
Available structures
PDB	Ortholog search: PDBe RCSB
PDB	List of PDB id codes 1RXD, 1XM2
Enzyme activity
EC #	BRENDA	ExPASy	KEGG	MetaCyc
3.1.3.48	↗	↗	↗	↗

Gene location (Human)
Chr.	Chromosome 6 (human)
Band	6q12	Start	63,521,746 bp
Band	6q12	End	63,583,436 bp
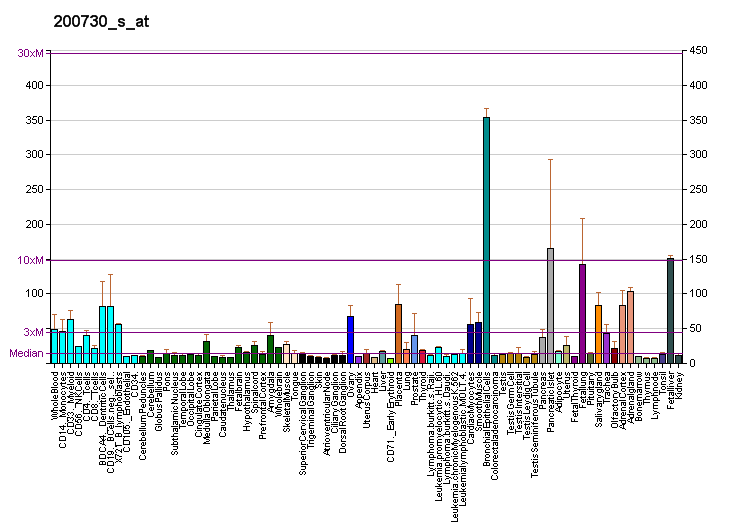

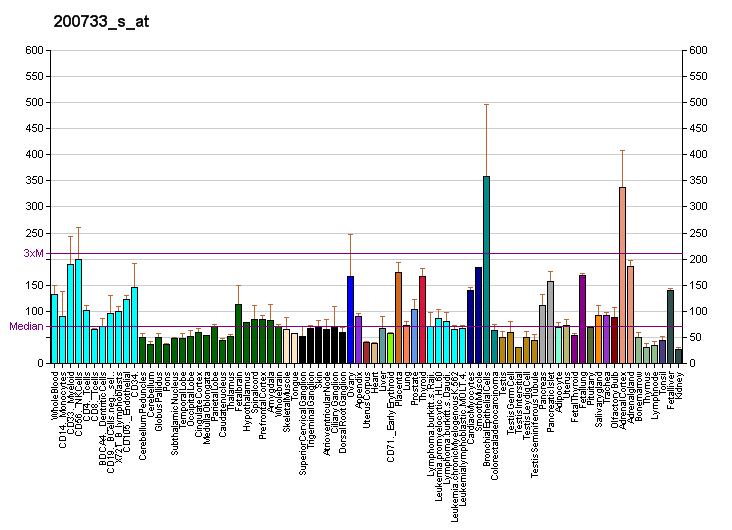

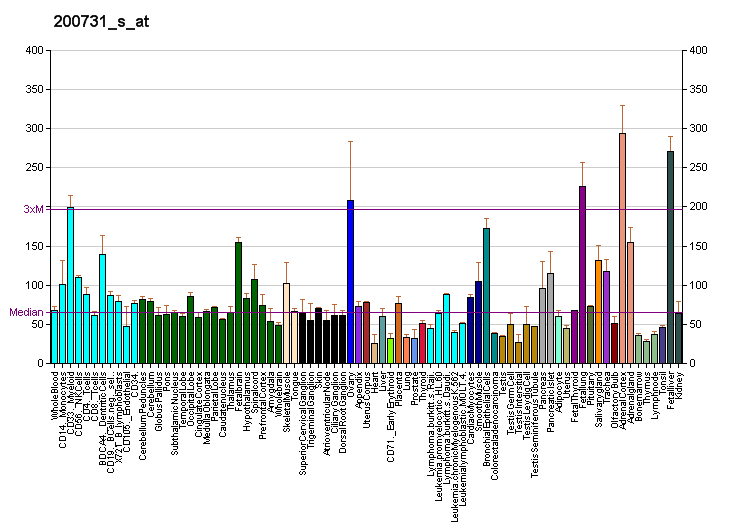
RNA expression pattern
Bgee	Human / Mouse (ortholog); Top expressed in: islet of Langerhans; muscle of thigh; liver; right lobe of liver; rectum; gastrocnemius muscle; ganglionic eminence; skeletal muscle tissue; ventricular zone; smooth muscle tissue / n/a; More reference expression data
BioGPS	More reference expression data
Gene ontology
Molecular function	phosphoprotein phosphatase activity; phosphatase activity; protein tyrosine phosphatase activity; hydrolase activity; protein tyrosine/serine/threonine phosphatase activity; protein binding
Cellular component	cytoplasm; endosome; membrane; plasma membrane; spindle; early endosome; endoplasmic reticulum; cytoplasmic side of plasma membrane; cytoskeleton; nucleus
Biological process	positive regulation of cell migration; protein dephosphorylation; multicellular organism development; cell cycle; dephosphorylation; peptidyl-tyrosine dephosphorylation
Sources:Amigo / QuickGO
Orthologs
Databases	NCBI: entry; OMA: entry
Species	Human	Mouse
Entrez	7803	19243
Ensembl	ENSG00000112245	ENSMUSG00000026064
UniProt	Q93096	Q63739
RefSeq (mRNA)	NM_003463	NM_011200
RefSeq (protein)	NP_003454	NP_035330
Location (UCSC)	Chr 6: 63.52 – 63.58 Mb	n/a
PubMed search
- Wikidata
View/Edit Human	View/Edit Mouse

Protein tyrosine phosphatase type IVA 1 is an enzyme that in humans is encoded by the PTP4A1 gene.

The protein encoded by this gene belongs to a small class of prenylated protein tyrosine phosphatases (PTPs), which contains a PTP domain and a characteristic C-terminal prenylation motif. PTPs are cell signaling molecules that play regulatory roles in a variety of cellular processes. This tyrosine phosphatase is a nuclear protein, but may primarily associate with plasma membrane. The surface membrane association of this protein depends on its C-terminal prenylation. Overexpression of this gene in mammalian cells conferred a transformed phenotype, which implicated its role in the tumorigenesis. Studies in rat suggested that this gene may be an immediate-early gene in mitogen-stimulated cells.

== Interactions ==
PTP4A1 has been shown to interact with ATF7.
