= NDEL1 =

Protein-coding gene in the species Homo sapiens

Identifiers
- Aliases: NDEL1, EOPA, MITAP1, NDE1L1, NDE2, NUDEL, nudE neurodevelopment protein 1 like 1
- External IDs: OMIM: 607538; MGI: 1932915; GeneCards: NDEL1
Available structures
PDB	Ortholog search: PDBe RCSB
PDB	List of PDB id codes 2V66

Gene location (Human)
Chr.	Chromosome 17 (human)
Band	17p13.1	Start	8,413,131 bp
Band	17p13.1	End	8,490,411 bp

Gene location (Mouse)
Chr.	Chromosome 11 (mouse)
Band	11|11 B3	Start	68,712,260 bp
Band	11|11 B3	End	68,762,684 bp
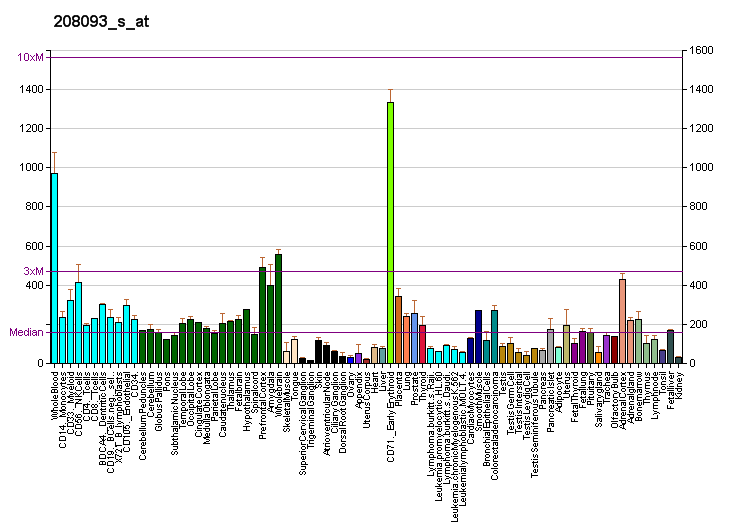
RNA expression pattern
Bgee	Human / Mouse (ortholog); Top expressed in: skin of leg; secondary oocyte; skin of abdomen; blood; right lung; Achilles tendon; bone marrow cell; ascending aorta; epithelium of colon; Descending thoracic aorta / Top expressed in: seminal vesicula; molar; granulocyte; calvaria; lip; vastus lateralis muscle; esophagus; triceps brachii muscle; skin of external ear; sternocleidomastoid muscle; More reference expression data
BioGPS	More reference expression data
Gene ontology
Molecular function	alpha-tubulin binding; protein binding; beta-tubulin binding; oligopeptidase activity; microtubule binding; identical protein binding; protein-containing complex binding
Cellular component	cytoplasm; cell body; neurofilament cytoskeleton; nuclear envelope; synaptic vesicle; spindle; chromosome; microtubule organizing center; microtubule associated complex; axon; cell leading edge; axon hillock; microtubule; chromosome, centromeric region; cytoskeleton; kinetochore; axon cytoplasm; cytosol; central region of growth cone; centrosome; kinesin complex
Biological process	retrograde axonal transport; cell differentiation; activation of GTPase activity; chromosome segregation; neuron migration; positive regulation of axon regeneration; nervous system development; proteolysis; neuron projection extension; inner cell mass cell proliferation; multicellular organism development; regulation of intracellular protein transport; positive regulation of GTPase activity; nuclear membrane disassembly; positive regulation of axon extension; neurofilament cytoskeleton organization; cerebral cortex radially oriented cell migration; neuron projection development; microtubule cytoskeleton organization; central nervous system neuron axonogenesis; insulin receptor signaling pathway; establishment of mitotic spindle orientation; microtubule nucleation; mitotic centrosome separation; regulation of neuron projection development; cell migration; vesicle transport along microtubule; establishment of chromosome localization; centrosome localization; lysosome localization; positive regulation of ruffle assembly
Sources:Amigo / QuickGO
Orthologs
Databases	NCBI: entry; OMA: entry
Species	Human	Mouse
Entrez	81565	83431
Ensembl	ENSG00000166579	ENSMUSG00000018736
UniProt	Q9GZM8	Q9ERR1
RefSeq (mRNA)	NM_001025579; NM_030808; NM_001330129	NM_023668; NM_001363304; NM_001363305
RefSeq (protein)	NP_001020750; NP_001317058; NP_110435	NP_076157; NP_001350233; NP_001350234
Location (UCSC)	Chr 17: 8.41 – 8.49 Mb	Chr 11: 68.71 – 68.76 Mb
PubMed search
- Wikidata
View/Edit Human	View/Edit Mouse

Nuclear distribution protein nudE-like 1 is a protein that in humans is encoded by the NDEL1 gene.

== Gene ==
Alternate transcriptional splice variants, encoding different isoforms, have been characterized.

== Structure ==
Secondary structure of Ndel1 is composed of various distinct domains: a C-terminal region, and a 200 amino acid N-terminal coiled-coil domain. The coiled-coil domain of Ndel1 serves as a self-associating stable parallel homodimer. Such structural components help with interactions between an array of binding partners, including the motor protein dynein and its cofactor protein, Lis1. Ndel1 forms a heterotetramer complex with Lis1 via the N-terminal coiled-coil domain. The Ndel1 N-terminal coiled-coil domain mediates binding to dynein, whereas the C-terminal domain interacts with Lis1, regulating the activity of the dynein complex.

== Function ==
NDEL1 plays a significant role in intracellular transport and the process of cellular division via regulation of the dynein motor protein and its cofactor protein, Lis1. Ndel1 is a highly conserved protein and its human gene, NDEL1 is expressed in a wide variety of brain tissues which contributes to neuronal function and development. Nde1 and Ndel1 were in the past referred to as NudE and NudEL respectively. The Nde1 protein is involved in nuclear migration throughout the process of neurogenesis. Studies have revealed that Ndel1 is structurally similar to Nde1 which both play a role in microtubule-based transport. Ndel1 and Nde1 are also thought to be associated with neurodevelopmental and psychiatric disorders.

This gene product is a thiol-activated oligopeptidase and is also known as Endooligopeptidase A in that context. It is phosphorylated in M phase of the cell cycle. Phosphorylation regulates the cell cycle-dependent distribution of this protein, with a fraction of the protein bound strongly to centrosomes in interphase and localized to mitotic spindles in early M phase. Overall, this protein plays a role in nervous system development.

== Other interactions ==
NDEL1 has been shown to interact with Cyclin-dependent kinase 5, YWHAE, PAFAH1B1 and DISC1.
