= Prolyl endopeptidase =

Enzyme

PREP
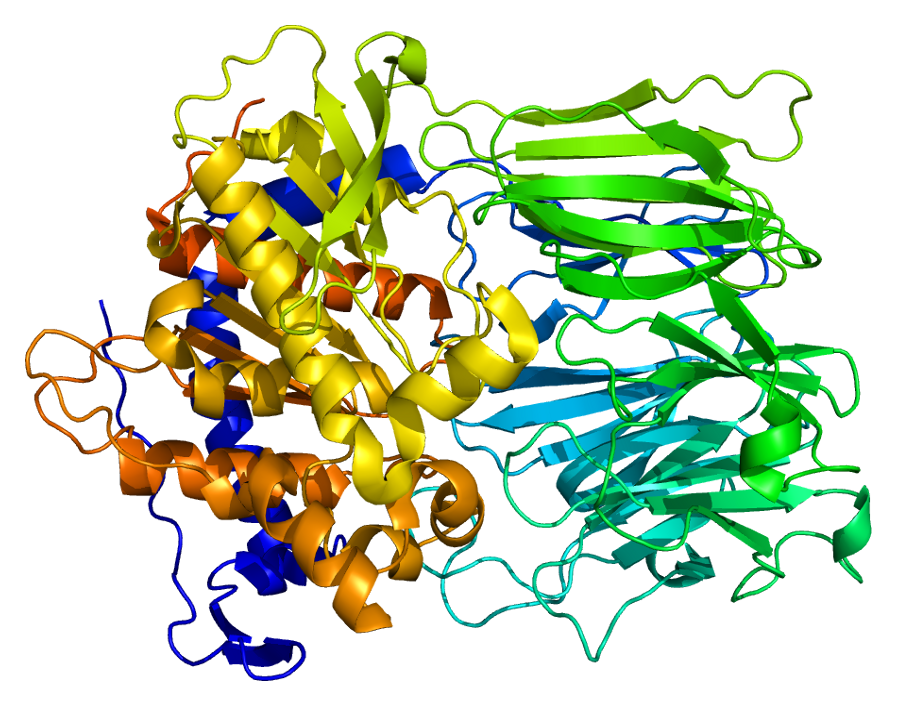
Available structures
PDB	Ortholog search: PDBe RCSB
PDB	List of PDB id codes 3DDU

Identifiers
- Aliases: PREP, PE, PEP, prolyl endopeptidase
- External IDs: OMIM: 600400; MGI: 1270863; HomoloGene: 2042; GeneCards: PREP; OMA:PREP - orthologs

Gene location (Human)
Chr.	Chromosome 6 (human)
Band	6q21	Start	105,273,218 bp
Band	6q21	End	105,454,062 bp
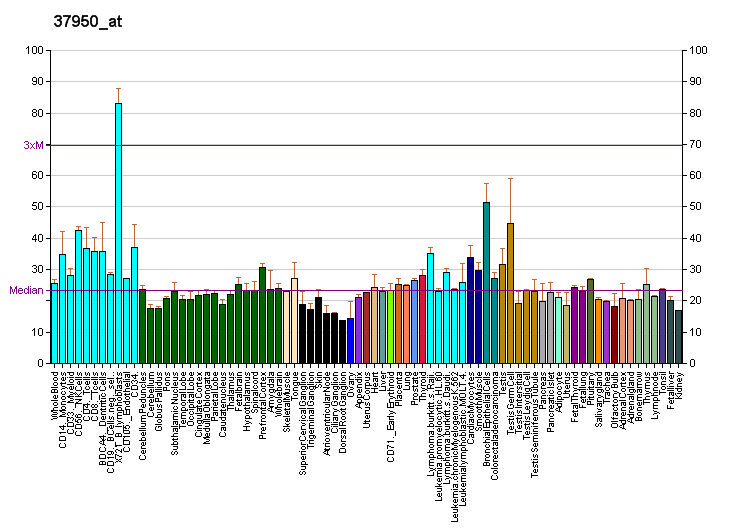

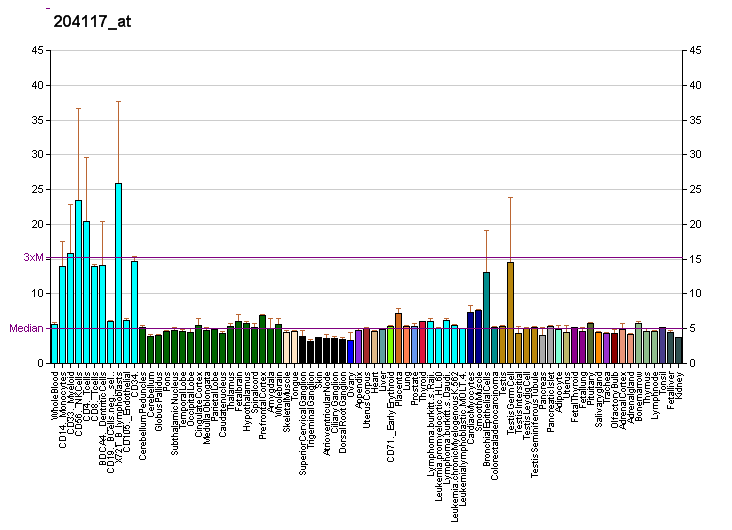
RNA expression pattern
Bgee	Human / Mouse (ortholog); Top expressed in: secondary oocyte; gastrocnemius muscle; mucosa of transverse colon; rectum; triceps brachii muscle; muscle of thigh; Skeletal muscle tissue of rectus abdominis; glutes; mucosa of sigmoid colon; biceps brachii / n/a; More reference expression data
BioGPS	More reference expression data
Gene ontology
Molecular function	serine-type exopeptidase activity; peptidase activity; serine-type peptidase activity; serine-type endopeptidase activity; protein binding; hydrolase activity; endopeptidase activity; oligopeptidase activity
Cellular component	membrane; nucleus; cytoplasm; cytosol
Biological process	proteolysis
Sources:Amigo / QuickGO
Orthologs
Species	Human	Mouse
Entrez	5550	19072
Ensembl	ENSG00000085377	ENSMUSG00000019849
UniProt	P48147	Q9QUR6
RefSeq (mRNA)	NM_002726	NM_011156
RefSeq (protein)	NP_002717	NP_035286
Location (UCSC)	Chr 6: 105.27 – 105.45 Mb	n/a
PubMed search
- Wikidata
View/Edit Human	View/Edit Mouse

Prolyl endopeptidase (PE) also known as prolyl oligopeptidase or post-proline cleaving enzyme is an enzyme that in humans is encoded by the PREP gene.

== Function ==
prolyl oligopeptidase

Identifiers
- EC no.: 3.4.21.26
- CAS no.: 72162-84-6

Databases
- IntEnz: IntEnz view
- BRENDA: BRENDA entry
- ExPASy: NiceZyme view
- KEGG: KEGG entry
- MetaCyc: metabolic pathway
- PRIAM: profile
- PDB structures: RCSB PDB PDBe PDBsum
- Gene Ontology: AmiGO / QuickGO
Search
- PMC: articles
- PubMed: articles
- NCBI: proteins

Prolyl endopeptidase is a large cytosolic enzyme that belongs to a distinct class of serine peptidases. It was first described in the cytosol of rabbit brain as an oligopeptidase, which degrades the nonapeptide bradykinin at the Pro-Phe bond. The enzyme is involved in the maturation and degradation of peptide hormones and neuropeptides such as alpha-melanocyte-stimulating hormone, luteinizing hormone-releasing hormone (LH-RH), thyrotropin-releasing hormone, angiotensin, neurotensin, oxytocin, substance P and vasopressin. PREP cleaves peptide bonds at the C-terminal side of proline residues. Its activity is confined to action on oligopeptides of less than 10 kD and it has an absolute requirement for the trans-configuration of the peptide bond preceding proline.

Prolyl endopeptidases are involved in the maturation and degradation of peptide hormones and neuropeptides.

== Structure ==
Prolyl endopeptidase is a cytosolic prolyl endopeptidase that cleaves peptide bonds on the C-terminal side of prolyl residues within peptides that are up to approximately 30 amino acids long. Only short protein residues are able to enter the active site of prolyl endopeptidase due to the distinct beta-propeller region that acts as a gating filter mechanism.

Prolyl endopeptidase was also found to be involved in the metabolism of VHL-PROTACs in in vitro studies.

== Clinical significance ==
Altered PREP activity may be associated with autism spectrum disorders and various psychological diseases such as schizophrenia, mania and clinical depression.

However, there is conflicting information as to the exact role that prolyl endopeptidase plays in the pathophysiology of depression, with earlier studies documenting a decreased activity of the enzyme in depressed patients, but more recent studies demonstrating that inhibition of the same enzyme actually results in alleviation of depressive symptoms.

Some types of prolyl endopeptidase have been used in studies to decrease the propensity of gluten-containing wheat products to aggravate coeliac disease. However, orally administered enzymes are potentially subject to inactivation in the gastrointestinal tract.

== Inhibitors ==
Several prolyl endopeptidase inhibitors are known, and have been suggested as possible nootropic and antidepressant drugs. Notable compounds include:

- Pramiracetam
- Baicalin
- JTP-4819
- KYP-2047
- S-17092
- Berberine
