= Activating transcription factor =

Class of DNA-binding proteins that regulate gene transcription

Activating transcription factor, ATF, is a group of bZIP transcription factors, which act as homodimers or heterodimers with a range of other bZIP factors. First, they have been described as members of the CREB/ATF family, whereas it turned out later that some of them might be more similar to AP-1-like factors such as c-Jun or c-Fos. In general, ATFs are known to respond to extracellular signals and this suggests an important role that they have in maintaining homeostasis. Some of these ATFs, such as ATF3, ATF4, and ATF6 are known to play a role in stress responses. Another example of ATFs function would be ATFx that can suppress apoptosis.

Genes include ATF1, ATF2, ATF3, ATF4, ATF5, ATF6, ATF7, ATFx.
