= C1D =

Protein-coding gene in humans

Identifiers
- Aliases: C1D, LRP1, SUN-CoR, SUNCOR, hRrp47, C1D nuclear receptor corepressor
- External IDs: OMIM: 606997; MGI: 1927354; GeneCards: C1D

Gene location (Human)
Chr.	Chromosome 2 (human)
Band	2p14	Start	68,041,130 bp
Band	2p14	End	68,110,948 bp

Gene location (Mouse)
Chr.	Chromosome 11 (mouse)
Band	11|11 A2	Start	17,207,579 bp
Band	11|11 A2	End	17,219,176 bp
RNA expression pattern
Bgee	Human / Mouse (ortholog); Top expressed in: islet of Langerhans; monocyte; bone marrow; endometrium; gastrocnemius muscle; skeletal muscle tissue; vagina; right adrenal cortex; lymph node; olfactory zone of nasal mucosa / Top expressed in: migratory enteric neural crest cell; dorsomedial hypothalamic nucleus; medial ganglionic eminence; atrioventricular valve; intercostal muscle; lateral hypothalamus; Gonadal ridge; paraventricular nucleus of hypothalamus; mammillary body; endocardial cushion; More reference expression data
BioGPS	n/a
Gene ontology
Molecular function	DNA binding; protein binding; nuclear receptor binding; transcription corepressor activity; RNA binding
Cellular component	cytoplasm; nuclear exosome (RNase complex); transcription repressor complex; nucleolus; nucleus; nucleoplasm
Biological process	negative regulation of transcription, DNA-templated; regulation of transcription, DNA-templated; maturation of 5.8S rRNA; transcription, DNA-templated; apoptotic process; rRNA processing
Sources:Amigo / QuickGO
Orthologs
Databases	NCBI: entry; OMA: entry
Species	Human	Mouse
Entrez	10438	57316
Ensembl	ENSG00000197223	ENSMUSG00000000581
UniProt	Q13901	O35473
RefSeq (mRNA)	NM_173177; NM_001190263; NM_001190265; NM_006333	NM_020558; NM_001330649
RefSeq (protein)	NP_001177192; NP_001177194; NP_006324; NP_775269	NP_001317578; NP_065583
Location (UCSC)	Chr 2: 68.04 – 68.11 Mb	Chr 11: 17.21 – 17.22 Mb
PubMed search
- Wikidata
View/Edit Human	View/Edit Mouse

Nuclear nucleic acid-binding protein C1D is a protein that in humans is encoded by the C1D gene. The C1D protein is encoded by a DNA binding gene traced in the nucleus. Protein C1D has a chromosomal location of 2p14. C1D has a family of proteins consisting of C1D homologues which may include Sas10 domains. C1D is thought to bind to RNA and DNA where it may be involved in mechanisms of DNA repair. Protein C1D is ubiquitously expressed in different human tissues.

== Function ==
Despite inducing denaturing conditions, C1D shows high-affinity binding to DNA. C1D has demonstrated capability to bind to DNA in DNA repair pathways.

The protein encoded by this gene is a DNA binding and apoptosis-inducing protein and is localized in the nucleus. It is also a Rac3-interacting protein which acts as a corepressor for the thyroid hormone receptor. This protein is thought to regulate TRAX/Translin complex formation. Protein C1D may have a protective effect against relation to the TRAX/Translin complex formation of DNA. Several alternatively spliced transcript variants of this gene have been described, but the full length nature of some of these variants has not been determined.

== Interactions ==
C1D has been shown to interact with TSNAX and DNA-PKcs. C1D has also shown to interact notably in mammalian cells and yeast. Interaction in mammalian cells only occur ensuing gamma-irradiation.

== Protein expression ==
The protein C1D is thought to be expressed ubiquitously. It may be expressed in high levels in the mammary gland, thyroid gland, salivary gland, medulla oblongata, and hippocampus. It may be expressed at lower levels in the appendix, heart, lungs, skeletal muscles, and colon.
