= CEP63 =

Protein-coding gene in the species Homo sapiens

Identifiers
- Aliases: CEP63, SCKL6, centrosomal protein 63
- External IDs: OMIM: 614724; MGI: 2158560; GeneCards: CEP63

Gene location (Human)
Chr.	Chromosome 3 (human)
Band	3q22.2	Start	134,485,699 bp
Band	3q22.2	End	134,587,789 bp

Gene location (Mouse)
Chr.	Chromosome 9 (mouse)
Band	9 F1|9 54.61 cM	Start	102,461,787 bp
Band	9 F1|9 54.61 cM	End	102,503,733 bp
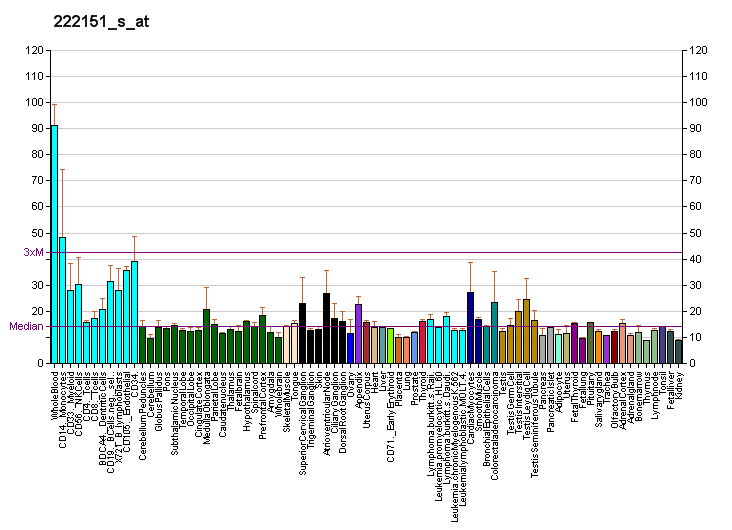

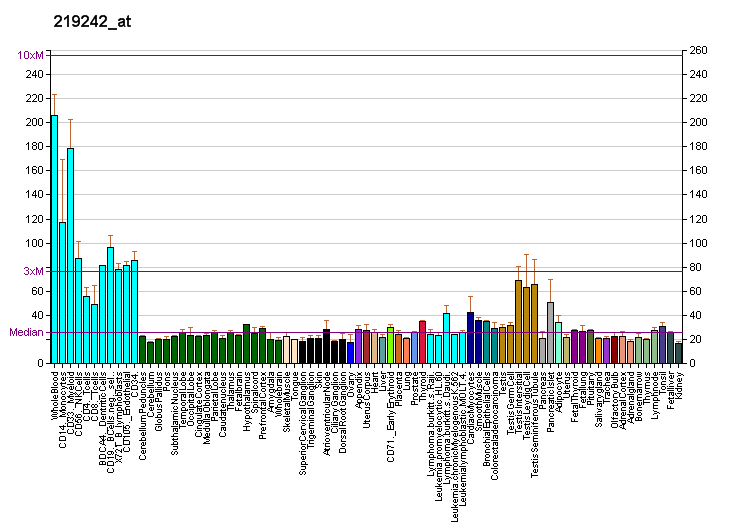
RNA expression pattern
Bgee	Human / Mouse (ortholog); Top expressed in: Achilles tendon; epithelium of colon; sural nerve; muscle of thigh; monocyte; left testis; gastrocnemius muscle; ganglionic eminence; gonad; right testis / Top expressed in: spermatid; seminiferous tubule; spermatocyte; tail of embryo; neural layer of retina; genital tubercle; otolith organ; utricle; ventricular zone; muscle of thigh; More reference expression data
BioGPS	More reference expression data
Gene ontology
Molecular function	protein binding
Cellular component	cytoplasm; microtubule organizing center; centriole; cytosol; centrosome; spindle pole; cytoskeleton
Biological process	spindle assembly; cell division; cell cycle; DNA damage checkpoint signaling; G2/M transition of mitotic cell cycle; de novo centriole assembly involved in multi-ciliated epithelial cell differentiation; signal transduction in response to DNA damage; cellular response to DNA damage stimulus; centriole replication; ciliary basal body-plasma membrane docking; regulation of G2/M transition of mitotic cell cycle
Sources:Amigo / QuickGO
Orthologs
Databases	NCBI: entry; OMA: entry
Species	Human	Mouse
Entrez	80254	28135
Ensembl	ENSG00000182923	ENSMUSG00000032534
UniProt	Q96MT8	Q3UPP8
RefSeq (mRNA)	NM_001042383; NM_001042384; NM_001042400; NM_025180; NM_001353108 NM_001353109; NM_001353110; NM_001353111; NM_001353112; NM_001353113; NM_001353117; NM_001353118; NM_001353119; NM_001353120; NM_001353121; NM_001353122; NM_001353123; NM_001353124; NM_001353125; NM_001353126	NM_001081122; NM_001301689
RefSeq (protein)	NP_001035842; NP_001035843; NP_001035859; NP_079456; NP_001340037 NP_001340038; NP_001340039; NP_001340040; NP_001340041; NP_001340042; NP_001340046; NP_001340047; NP_001340048; NP_001340049; NP_001340050; NP_001340051; NP_001340052; NP_001340053; NP_001340054; NP_001340055	NP_001074591; NP_001288618; NP_001394628; NP_001394629; NP_001394630 NP_001394631; NP_001394632; NP_001394633; NP_001394634; NP_001394635; NP_001394636; NP_001394637; NP_001394638; NP_001394639; NP_001394640; NP_001394641; NP_001394642; NP_001394643; NP_001394644; NP_001394645; NP_001394646; NP_001394647; NP_001394648; NP_001394649; NP_001394650; NP_001394651; NP_001394652
Location (UCSC)	Chr 3: 134.49 – 134.59 Mb	Chr 9: 102.46 – 102.5 Mb
PubMed search
- Wikidata
View/Edit Human	View/Edit Mouse

Centrosomal protein of 63 kDa is a protein that in humans is encoded by the CEP63 gene. Several alternatively spliced transcript variants have been found, but their biological validity has not been determined.

== Function ==
This gene encodes a protein with six coiled-coil domains. The protein is localized to the centrosome, a non-membraneous organelle that functions as the major microtubule-organizing center in animal cells. Recent computational analysis revealed pathogenic property of L61P point mutation in CEP63 protein that affected its native structural conformation.

== Interactions ==
CEP63 has been shown to interact with DISC1, CEP152 and CDK1.
