= ATF7 =

Protein-coding gene in the species Homo sapiens

Identifiers
- Aliases: ATF7, ATFA, activating transcription factor 7
- External IDs: OMIM: 606371; MGI: 2443472; GeneCards: ATF7

Gene location (Human)
Chr.	Chromosome 12 (human)
Band	12q13.13	Start	53,507,856 bp
Band	12q13.13	End	53,626,410 bp

Gene location (Mouse)
Chr.	Chromosome 15 (mouse)
Band	15|15 F3	Start	102,434,381 bp
Band	15|15 F3	End	102,533,899 bp
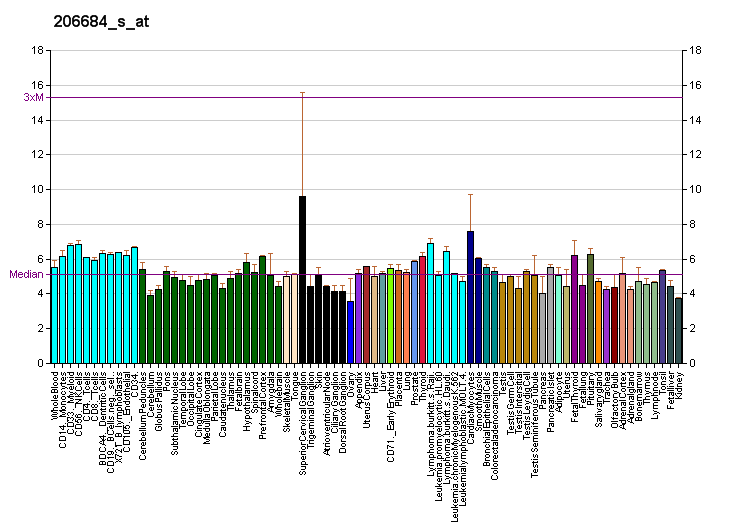
RNA expression pattern
Bgee	Human / Mouse (ortholog); Top expressed in: popliteal artery; tibial arteries; gastric mucosa; epithelium of colon; Descending thoracic aorta; minor salivary glands; ascending aorta; right coronary artery; left coronary artery; sural nerve / Top expressed in: neural layer of retina; muscle of thigh; yolk sac; lip; zygote; aortic valve; genital tubercle; ascending aorta; granulocyte; tail of embryo; More reference expression data
BioGPS	More reference expression data
Gene ontology
Molecular function	DNA-binding transcription factor activity; RNA polymerase II cis-regulatory region sequence-specific DNA binding; enzyme binding; DNA binding; DNA-binding transcription repressor activity, RNA polymerase II-specific; transcription factor binding; protein binding; metal ion binding; mitogen-activated protein kinase binding; nucleic acid binding; DNA-binding transcription factor activity, RNA polymerase II-specific
Cellular component	cytoplasm; nuclear periphery; nucleus; nucleoplasm
Biological process	viral process; regulation of transcription, DNA-templated; negative regulation of transcription by RNA polymerase II; transcription, DNA-templated; regulation of transcription by RNA polymerase II
Sources:Amigo / QuickGO
Orthologs
Databases	NCBI: entry; OMA: entry
Species	Human	Mouse
Entrez	11016	223922
Ensembl	ENSG00000170653	ENSMUSG00000099083
UniProt	P17544	Q8R0S1
RefSeq (mRNA)	NM_001130059; NM_001130060; NM_001206682; NM_001206683; NM_006856 NM_001366555; NM_001366556; NM_001366558; NM_001366561; NM_001366562; NM_001366563	NM_146065; NM_001310066; NM_001310067; NM_001310070
RefSeq (protein)	NP_001123532; NP_001193611; NP_001193612; NP_006847; NP_001353484 NP_001353485; NP_001353487; NP_001353490; NP_001353491; NP_001353492	NP_001296995; NP_001296996; NP_001296999
Location (UCSC)	Chr 12: 53.51 – 53.63 Mb	Chr 15: 102.43 – 102.53 Mb
PubMed search
- Wikidata
View/Edit Human	View/Edit Mouse

Cyclic AMP-dependent transcription factor ATF-7 is a protein that in humans is encoded by the ATF7 gene.

== Homonym ==
In 2001, Peters et al. published a paper showing that ATF-7, a Novel bZIP Protein, interacts with PTP4A1. This ATF-7 is actually ATF5 and not ATF7, as noted by the authors at the end of their paper ("Note Added in Proof—While this manuscript was under review, sequences for mouse and human ATF-5 were deposited in GenBankTM. It appears that ATF-7 and ATF-5 are likely to be the same protein. In addition, an unrelated sequence named ATF7 has also been deposited in GenBankTM. In order to avoid confusion, future work on the protein described in this publication will likely refer to it as either ATF-5 or ATF-5/7.")
