= ATF/CREB =

Group of transcription factors

The ATF/CREB family is a group of transcription factors, consisting of different ATFs (Activating transcription factors), CREB (cAMP response element binding protein), CREM (cAMP response element modulator) and related proteins. Among the transcription factors assigned to this group, some are more related to CREB-like, factors, whereas other exhibit closer similarity with the AP-1 transcription factor components c-Jun or c-Fos.

Common features are a basic leucine zipper type of DNA-binding domain and binding as a dimer to DNA sequences like 5'-TGACGTCA-3' or 5'-TGA(C/G)TCA-3' as recognition sequences.
