= Translin =

Protein-coding gene in the species Homo sapiens

TSN
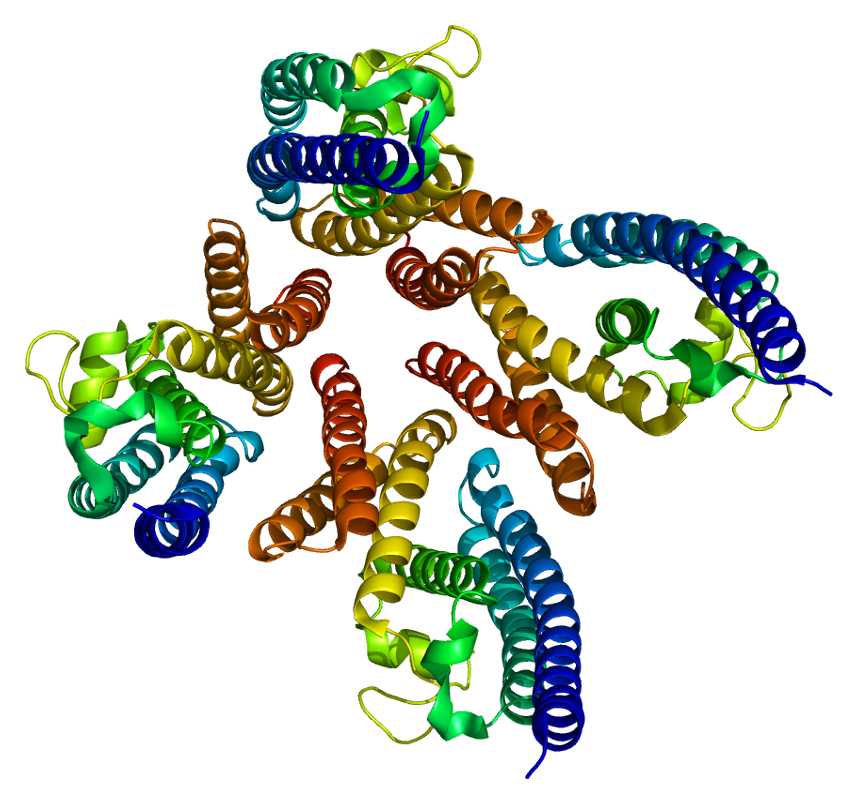
Available structures
| PDB | Ortholog search: PDBe RCSB |
| PDB | List of PDB id codes 1J1J, 3PJA, 3QB5, 4WYV |

Identifiers
- Aliases: TSN, BCLF-1, C3PO, RCHF1, REHF-1, TBRBP, TRSLN, translin
- External IDs: OMIM: 600575; MGI: 109263; HomoloGene: 3397; GeneCards: TSN; OMA:TSN - orthologs

Gene location (Human)
| Chr. | Chromosome 2 (human) |
| Band | 2q14.3 | Start | 121,737,103 bp |
| Band | 2q14.3 | End | 121,767,853 bp |

Gene location (Mouse)
| Chr. | Chromosome 1 (mouse) |
| Band | 1|1 E2.3 | Start | 118,222,508 bp |
| Band | 1|1 E2.3 | End | 118,239,469 bp |
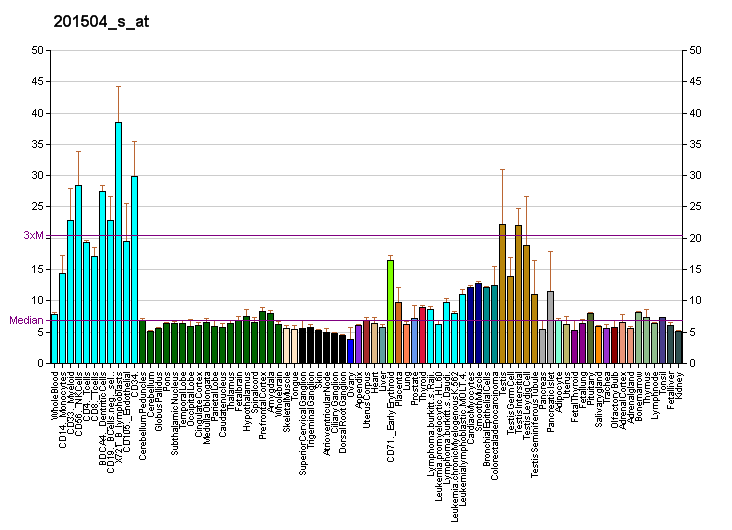

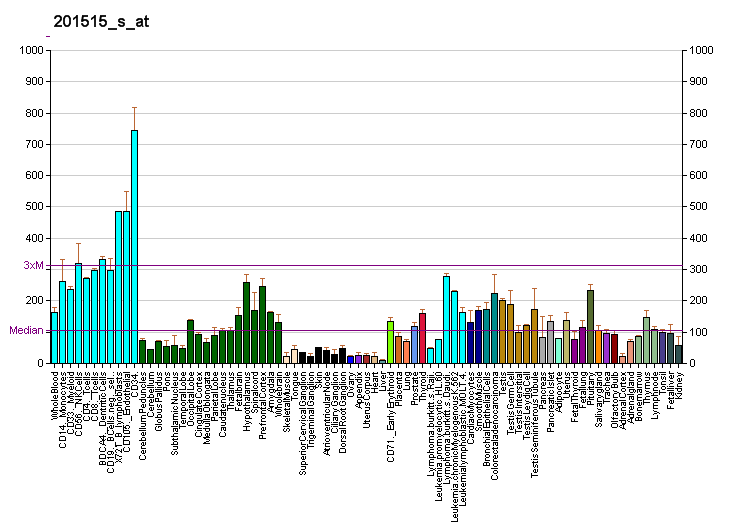
RNA expression pattern
| Bgee | Human / Mouse (ortholog); Top expressed in: gonad; secondary oocyte; skin of hip; optic nerve; skin of thigh; ganglionic eminence; thoracic diaphragm; germinal epithelium; islet of Langerhans; superficial temporal artery / Top expressed in: trigeminal ganglion; endothelial cell of lymphatic vessel; Rostral migratory stream; renal corpuscle; primitive streak; medullary collecting duct; vestibular sensory epithelium; neural tube; Paneth cell; superior cervical ganglion; More reference expression data |
| BioGPS | More reference expression data |
Gene ontology
| Molecular function | DNA binding; nuclease activity; endonuclease activity; sequence-specific DNA binding; protein binding; mRNA binding; hydrolase activity; RNA binding; single-stranded DNA binding; identical protein binding; endoribonuclease activity; protein-containing complex binding |
| Cellular component | cytoplasm; cytosol; nucleus |
| Biological process | DNA recombination; nucleic acid phosphodiester bond hydrolysis; RNA metabolic process; RNA phosphodiester bond hydrolysis, endonucleolytic; production of siRNA involved in RNA interference |
Sources:Amigo / QuickGO
Orthologs
| Species | Human | Mouse |
| Entrez | 7247 | 22099 |
| Ensembl | ENSG00000211460 | ENSMUSG00000026374 |
| UniProt | Q15631 | Q62348 |
| RefSeq (mRNA) | NM_001261401; NM_004622 | NM_011650 |
| RefSeq (protein) | NP_001248330; NP_004613 | NP_035780 |
| Location (UCSC) | Chr 2: 121.74 – 121.77 Mb | Chr 1: 118.22 – 118.24 Mb |
| PubMed search |
- Wikidata
| View/Edit Human | View/Edit Mouse |

Translin is a DNA-binding protein that in humans is encoded by the TSN gene. Together with translin-associated factor X, translin forms the component 3 of promoter of RISC (C3PO) complex which facilitates endonucleolytic cleavage of the passenger strand during microRNA loading into the RNA-induced silencing complex (RISC).

== Function ==
This gene encodes a DNA-binding protein which specifically recognizes conserved target sequences at the breakpoint junction of chromosomal translocations. Translin polypeptides form a multimeric structure that is responsible for its DNA-binding activity. Recombination-associated motifs and translin-binding sites are present at recombination hotspots and may serve as indicators of breakpoints in genes which are fused by translocations. These binding activities may play a crucial role in chromosomal translocation in lymphoid neoplasms.

== Interactions ==
Translin has been shown to interact with PPP1R15A.
