= Thimet oligopeptidase =

Metallopeptidases protein coded in Humans

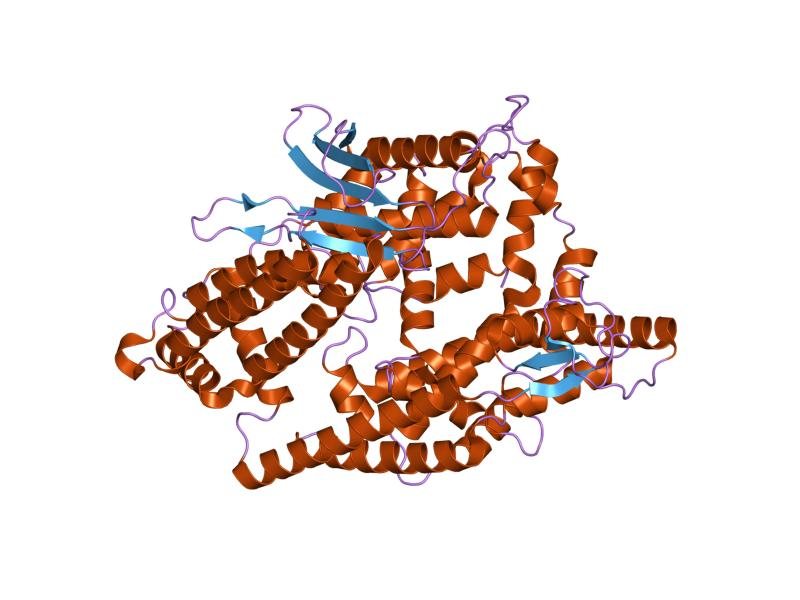

Identifiers
- EC no.: 3.4.24.15
- CAS no.: 110639-28-6

Databases
- BRENDA: enzyme data
- ExPASy: NiceZyme view
- KEGG: enzyme entry
- MetaCyc: metabolic pathway
- Rhea: reactions
- PDB structures: RCSB PDB PDBe PDBsum
Search
- PMC: articles
- PubMed: articles
- NCBI: proteins

Thimet oligopeptidases (EC 3.4.24.15), also known as TOPs, are a type of M3 metallopeptidases. These enzymes can be found in animals and plants, showing distinctive functions. In animals and humans, they are involved in the degradation of peptides, such as bradykinin, neurotensin, angiotensin I, and Aβ peptide, helping to regulate physiological processes. In plants, their role is related to the degradation of targeting peptides and the immune response to pathogens through Salicylic Acid (SA)-dependent stress signaling. In Arabidopsis thaliana—recognized as a model plant for scientific studies—two thimet oligopeptidases, known as TOP1 and TOP2, have been identified as targets for salicylic acid binding in the plant. These TOP enzymes are key components to understand the SA-mediated signaling where interactions exist with different components and most of the pathways are unknown.

== Origin and name ==
Thimet (from "thiolsensitive metallo") oligopeptidases (peptide-size restriction) have been widely studied in the Kingdom Animalia. The first TOP enzyme was found and purified from rat brain homogenates in 1983. Today, it is known that TOP enzymes are mostly distributed in the pituitary, brain, and testes of humans and rats. In plants, specifically in A. thaliana, the enzymes were more recently discovered as part of the 20S proteasome and SA-binding proteins.

Different names have been used to identify this group of enzymes, such as soluble metalloproteinase, Pz-peptidase, collagenase-like peptidase, thimet peptidase, and endopeptidase 24.15. In 1992 the name "thimet oligopeptidases" was proposed by the International Union of Biochemistry and Molecular Biology (IUBMB), preserving this name.

== Family ==
Thimet oligopeptidases are metallopeptidases that belong to the clan MA, subclan MA (E), family M3 and subfamily M3A. M3 family is composed by eight other members, such as neurolysin (EC 3.4.24.16), saccharolysin (EC:3.4.24.37), oligopeptidase MepB, oligopepetidase A, oligopeptidase F, oligopeptidase PepB, among others. These enzymes perform important functions in both prokaryotic and eukaryotic organisms.

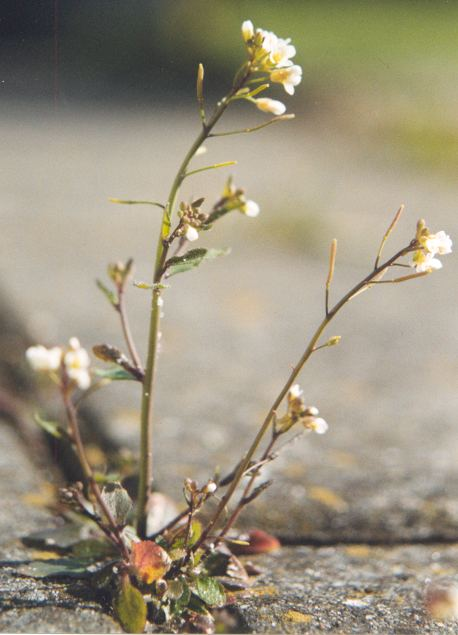
The plant Arabidopsis thaliana contains TOP1, TOP2, and TOPL enzymes.

== Arabidopsis thimet oligopeptidases ==
There are three types of TOPs found in Arabidopsis thaliana. TOP1 (also known as OOP, organellar oligopeptidase, TOPorg, and thimet metalloendopeptidase 1) is located in the mitochondria and chloroplasts and has the AT5G65620 gene. TOP2 (also known as thimet metalloendopeptidase 2) is located in the cytosol and has the AT5G10540 gene. The distinctive genes of these two enzymes are maintained in fruit fly, mosquito, and rice as well. Finally, TOPL (also known as TOP-like) is located in the cytosol and has the AT1G67690 gene.

These TOPs are similar to those found in mammalian tissues. TOP1 and TOP2 are more similar to the mouse TOP with 28% similarity in the amino acid sequence, whereas TOPL is more similar to the mouse neurolysin with 34% similarity in the amino acid sequence.

== Biochemical characteristics ==
Thimet oligopeptidases are M3 peptidases that possess the conserved sequence His-Glu-X-X-His in the amino acid sequence (as cited in Wang, 2014). The enzymes need the presence of thiol and zinc to be able of performing their functions. From the three recognized thimet oligopeptidases in A. thaliana, only TOP1 and TOP2 are the TOP enzymes involved in SA immune system response. They are able of performing their function in a wide range of pH from 6.5 to 8.5. TOP enzymes have the capacity to bind and form a dimer. They can exist as monomers and dimers.

TOP1 and TOP2 are considered homologs with a 93% similarity in the protein sequence. Their structures have two domains. However, these domains are closer in TOP1 than in TOP2 due to differences in the position of helices α6, α9, and α20 in the domain I. Because of that, TOP1 has a closed form and TOP2 an open form. Unlike TOP1, TOP2 does not contain an N-terminal serine-rich region in its sequence. Based on the localization within the cell, TOP1 is considered an organellar oligopeptidase with dual localization while TOP2 is named as a cytosolic oligopeptidase.

== Functions and interactions in plants ==
=== Peptide degradation ===
TOP1 plays a role in the pathway for degradation of unneeded peptides during importation of proteins to mitochondria and chloroplasts. This function can be explained due to changes in the closed conformation of TOP1 structure. The spheroidal shape, generating by the domains I and II, represents the catalytic cavity with a volume of ~3,000 Å^{3}. During the peptide degradation, the substrate binding can occur only if there is a separation of the two domains allowing the access and binding of the free targeting peptides to the cavity (active site). The enzyme substrate complex is maintained by several non-covalent interactions: hydrophobic and polar interactions. The process is limited by the peptide size. Thus, only peptides with approximately the same volume (~3,000 Å^{3}) can be degraded by the enzyme. Peptides that can be cleaved off are between 8 and 23 amino-acid residues.

In addition, it has been suggested that TOP1 takes place in the degradation of other types of peptides. The enzyme is important for the elimination of unfolded or damaged proteins within the organelles mitochondria and chloroplasts. During the cleavage process of the proteins, the enzyme can break down peptide fragments without any strict sequence requirement but only constrained by the peptide size.

TOP2 is part of the proteolytic activity that takes place in the cytosol. In A. thaliana, the enzyme has a role in the response to oxidative stress and degradation of oxidized proteins by breaking down peptides between 5 and 17 amino-acid residues.

=== Stress signaling and immunity response ===
Salicylic acid (SA), recognized as a phenolic compound, is involved in different biological processes within plants. This compound, together with other hormones, contributes to growth and development regulation. Additionally, they maintain plant immune response. In order to counter pathogen attacks and stress conditions, SA signaling activates the pathogen triggered immunity (PTI), effector-triggered immunity (ETI), and programmed cell death (PCD). TOP1 and TOP2 have shown a capacity to interact with salicylic acid and mediate SA activity in the system. In vitro experiments have shown that when these enzymes are not present or defective, the vulnerability to pathogen infection is higher.

TOPs proteolytic activity is affected by their monomer/dimer relation. Oxidative environment increases the dimer form and result in proteolytic activity inhibition while reducing environments, stimulate accumulation of monomers and then favor TOP enzymes activity. Under stress condition, the production of reactive oxygen species (ROS) increases, causing damages in the photosynthesis and the PCD. TOP enzymes mediate the response to this unfavorable condition. TOP1 regulates the importation of antioxidant enzymes to the chloroplast. These antioxidant enzymes reduce the ROS levels within the organelle. It has been suggested also that TOP1 allows the importation of enzymes that catalyze SA synthesis. On the other hand, TOP2 controls the amount of signaling peptides, important for PCD, in the cytosol. Oxidative damage, such as cadmium (Cd^{2+}) stress produces oxidized proteins that have to be removed to prevent further damage in the cell. TOP2 helps with the degradation of these damaged proteins. The enzyme degrades peptides by targeting the amino acids residues that are exposed during the stress.

=== Interaction between exogenous salicylic acid and thimet oligopeptidases ===
In plants, endogenous SA activation can be carried out by exogenous SA. Low levels of exogenous SA, considered as less than 10 μM, help to reduce the damage caused by abiotic stress and increase photosynthetic activity. In contrast, high levels of exogenous SA reduce photosynthetic activity and result in cell death. This high amount of exogenous SA interacts with TOP enzymes and results in a reduction of their enzymatic activity. TOP1 and TOP2 activity is reduced by approximately 60% in presence of 5 mN exogenous SA. This phenolic compound inhibits TOP enzymes by a non-competitive mechanism where SA binds in a site different to the active site. The type of reaction is characterized for having a decrease in the maximum velocity (Vmax), whereas the Michaelis constant (Km) is maintained unchanged.
