= LRRC39 =

Protein-coding gene in humans

Identifiers
- Aliases: LRRC39, leucine rich repeat containing 39
- External IDs: MGI: 1924557; GeneCards: LRRC39

Gene location (Mouse)
Chr.	Chromosome 3 (mouse)
Band	3|3 G1	Start	116,356,622 bp
Band	3|3 G1	End	116,376,783 bp
RNA expression pattern
Bgee	Human / Mouse (ortholog); Top expressed in: vastus lateralis muscle; biceps brachii; deltoid muscle; right ventricle; tibialis anterior muscle; gastrocnemius muscle; body of tongue; sperm; left adrenal gland; gastric mucosa / Top expressed in: soleus muscle; myocardium of ventricle; intercostal muscle; tibialis anterior muscle; knee joint; quadriceps femoris muscle; medial head of gastrocnemius muscle; vastus lateralis muscle; sternocleidomastoid muscle; digastric muscle; More reference expression data
BioGPS	n/a
Orthologs
Databases	NCBI: entry
Species	Human	Mouse
Entrez	127495	109245
Ensembl	n/a	ENSMUSG00000027961
UniProt	Q96DD0	Q8BGI7
RefSeq (mRNA)	NM_001256385; NM_001256386; NM_001256387; NM_144620	NM_027321; NM_175413; NM_001379629; NM_001379630
RefSeq (protein)	NP_001243314; NP_001243315; NP_001243316; NP_653221	NP_081597; NP_780622; NP_001366558; NP_001366559
Location (UCSC)	n/a	Chr 3: 116.36 – 116.38 Mb
PubMed search
- Wikidata
View/Edit Human	View/Edit Mouse

Leucine-rich repeat-containing protein 39 is a protein that in humans is encoded by the LRRC39 gene.
