= DISC2 =

Non-coding RNA in the species Homo sapiens

Identifiers
- Aliases: DISC2, DISC1-AS1, DISC1OS, NCRNA00015, disrupted in schizophrenia 2 (non-protein coding), disrupted in schizophrenia 2
- External IDs: OMIM: 606271; GeneCards: DISC2
Orthologs
Databases	NCBI: entry; OMA: entry
Species	Human	Mouse
Entrez	27184	n/a
Ensembl	ENSG00000274121	n/a
UniProt	n a	n/a
RefSeq (mRNA)	n/a	n/a
RefSeq (protein)	n/a	n/a
Location (UCSC)	n/a	n/a
PubMed search		n/a
- Wikidata
View/Edit Human

In molecular biology, disrupted in schizophrenia 2 (non-protein coding), also known as DISC2, is a long non-coding RNA molecule. In humans, the DISC2 gene that produces the DISC2 RNA molecule is located on chromosome 1, at the breakpoint associated with the chromosomal translocation found in Schizophrenia. It is antisense to the DISC1 gene and may regulate the expression of DISC1. DISC2 may also contribute to other psychiatric disorders.

== See also ==
- Long noncoding RNA
