= Translin-associated factor X =

Protein found in humans

TSNAX

Identifiers
- Aliases: TSNAX, TRAX, translin-associated factor X, translin associated factor X, C3PO
- External IDs: OMIM: 602964; MGI: 1855672; GeneCards: TSNAX
Available structures
PDB	Ortholog search: PDBe RCSB
PDB	List of PDB id codes 3PJA, 3QB5

Gene location (Human)
Chr.	Chromosome 1 (human)
Band	1q42.2	Start	231,528,541 bp
Band	1q42.2	End	231,566,524 bp

Gene location (Mouse)
Chr.	Chromosome 8 (mouse)
Band	8 E2|8 73.1 cM	Start	125,739,736 bp
Band	8 E2|8 73.1 cM	End	125,760,931 bp
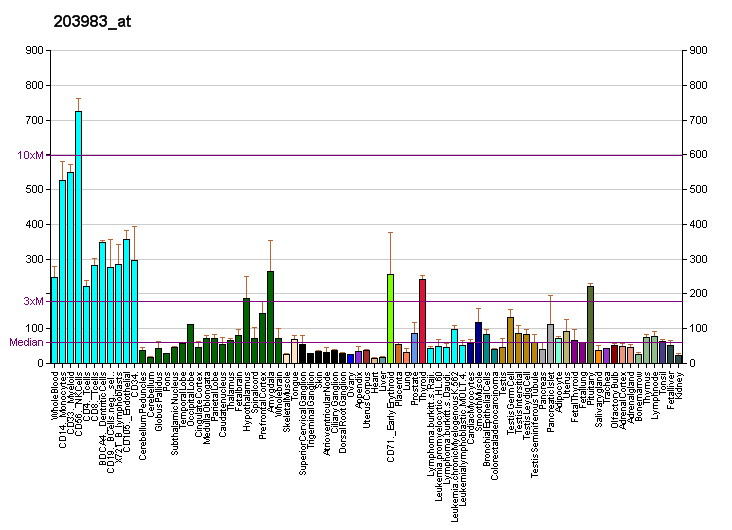
RNA expression pattern
Bgee	Human / Mouse (ortholog); Top expressed in: Epithelium of choroid plexus; parietal pleura; secondary oocyte; buccal mucosa cell; islet of Langerhans; Skeletal muscle tissue of rectus abdominis; visceral pleura; germinal epithelium; Skeletal muscle tissue of biceps brachii; monocyte / Top expressed in: superior frontal gyrus; primary visual cortex; dentate gyrus of hippocampal formation granule cell; Ileal epithelium; neural layer of retina; entorhinal cortex; temporal muscle; perirhinal cortex; muscle of thigh; prefrontal cortex; More reference expression data
BioGPS	More reference expression data
Gene ontology
Molecular function	sequence-specific DNA binding; DNA binding; protein binding; metal ion binding; RNA binding; single-stranded DNA binding; endoribonuclease activity; A2A adenosine receptor binding; protein-containing complex binding
Cellular component	cytoplasm; perinuclear region of cytoplasm; cytosol; Golgi apparatus; nucleus
Biological process	multicellular organism development; cell differentiation; spermatogenesis; protein transport; production of siRNA involved in RNA interference; RNA phosphodiester bond hydrolysis, endonucleolytic
Sources:Amigo / QuickGO
Orthologs
Databases	NCBI: entry; OMA: entry
Species	Human	Mouse
Entrez	7257	53424
Ensembl	ENSG00000116918	ENSMUSG00000056820
UniProt	Q99598	Q9QZE7
RefSeq (mRNA)	NM_005999	NM_016909
RefSeq (protein)	NP_005990	NP_058605
Location (UCSC)	Chr 1: 231.53 – 231.57 Mb	Chr 8: 125.74 – 125.76 Mb
PubMed search
- Wikidata
View/Edit Human	View/Edit Mouse

Translin-associated protein X (abbr. TSNAX or TRAX) is a protein that in humans is encoded by the TSNAX gene.

== Function ==
This gene encodes a protein which specifically interacts with translin, a DNA-binding protein that binds consensus sequences at breakpoint junctions of chromosomal translocations. The encoded protein contains bipartite nuclear targeting sequences that may provide nuclear transport for translin, which lacks any nuclear targeting motifs. Both TSNAX and translin form the C3PO complex which facilitates endonucleolytic cleavage of the passenger strand during microRNA loading into the RNA-induced silencing complex (RISC).

== Interactions ==
TSNAX has been shown to interact with C1D.
