= ATF5 =

Protein-coding gene in the species Homo sapiens

Identifiers
- Aliases: ATF5, ATFX, HMFN0395, activating transcription factor 5
- External IDs: OMIM: 606398; MGI: 2141857; GeneCards: ATF5

Gene location (Human)
Chr.	Chromosome 19 (human)
Band	19q13.33	Start	49,928,702 bp
Band	19q13.33	End	49,933,935 bp

Gene location (Mouse)
Chr.	Chromosome 7 (mouse)
Band	7|7 B3	Start	44,461,680 bp
Band	7|7 B3	End	44,466,082 bp
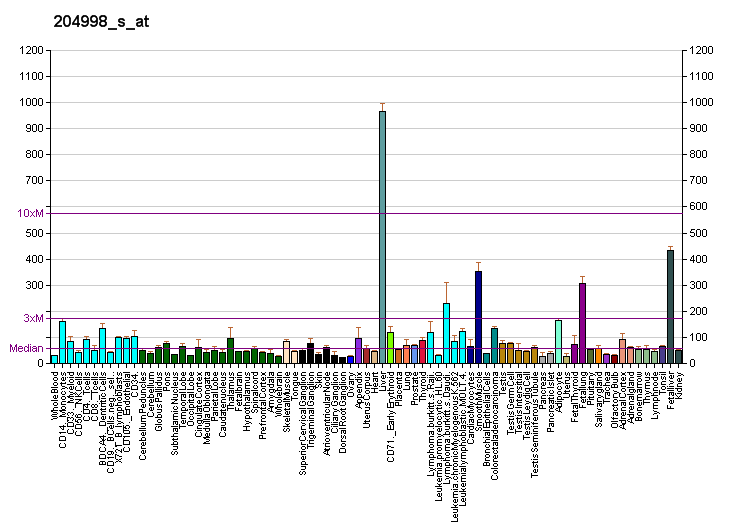

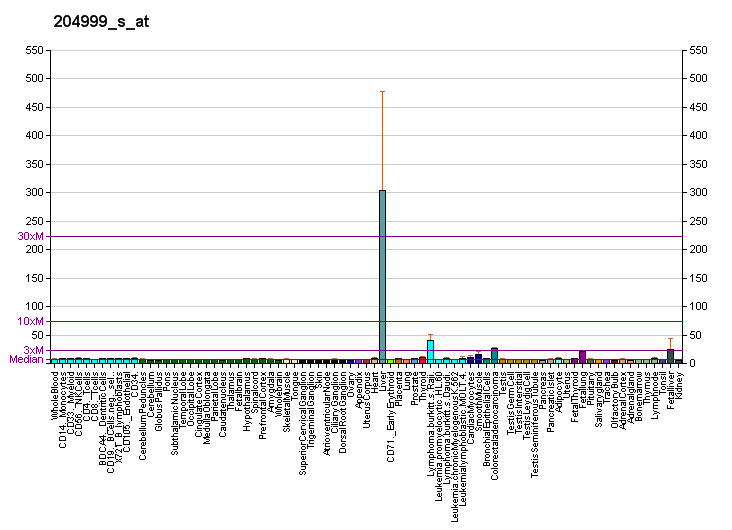
RNA expression pattern
Bgee	Human / Mouse (ortholog); Top expressed in: right lobe of liver; right adrenal cortex; gastric mucosa; left adrenal gland; left adrenal cortex; left testis; vena cava; right testis; monocyte; appendix / Top expressed in: olfactory system; olfactory epithelium; left lobe of liver; lip; esophagus; molar; calvaria; ankle; plantaris muscle; extensor digitorum longus muscle; More reference expression data
BioGPS	More reference expression data
Gene ontology
Molecular function	sequence-specific DNA binding; DNA binding; RNA polymerase II transcription regulatory region sequence-specific DNA binding; transcription corepressor activity; DNA-binding transcription factor activity; DNA-binding transcription activator activity, RNA polymerase II-specific; chromatin binding; tubulin binding; kinase binding; protein binding; DNA-binding transcription factor activity, RNA polymerase II-specific
Cellular component	centrosome; transcription regulator complex; nucleoplasm; microtubule organizing center; cytoskeleton; nucleus; cytoplasm; cytosol
Biological process	negative regulation of cell cycle G2/M phase transition; regulation of transcription, DNA-templated; olfactory bulb interneuron differentiation; multicellular organism growth; regulation of transcription by RNA polymerase II; negative regulation of apoptotic process; post-embryonic development; transcription, DNA-templated; cerebellar granule cell precursor proliferation; positive regulation of transcription, DNA-templated; regulation of centrosome cycle; circadian rhythm; olfactory bulb interneuron development; regulation of gene expression; olfactory lobe development; negative regulation of transcription, DNA-templated; fat cell differentiation; positive regulation of transcription by RNA polymerase II; negative regulation of cell population proliferation; transcription by RNA polymerase II
Sources:Amigo / QuickGO
Orthologs
Databases	NCBI: entry; OMA: entry
Species	Human	Mouse
Entrez	22809	107503
Ensembl	ENSG00000169136	ENSMUSG00000038539
UniProt	Q9Y2D1	O70191
RefSeq (mRNA)	NM_001193646; NM_001290746; NM_012068	NM_030693
RefSeq (protein)	NP_001180575; NP_001277675; NP_036200	NP_109618
Location (UCSC)	Chr 19: 49.93 – 49.93 Mb	Chr 7: 44.46 – 44.47 Mb
PubMed search
- Wikidata
View/Edit Human	View/Edit Mouse

Activating transcription factor 5, also known as ATF5, is a protein that, in humans, is encoded by the ATF5 gene.

== Function ==
First described by Nishizawa and Nagata, ATF5 has been classified as a member of the activating transcription factor (ATF)/cAMP response-element binding protein (CREB) family.

ATF5 transcripts and protein are expressed in a wide variety of tissues, in particular, high expression of transcripts in liver. It is also present in a variety of tumor cell types.

ATF5 expression is regulated at both the transcriptional and translational level.

ATF5 is expressed in VZ and SVZ during brain development.

The human ATF5 protein is made up of 282 amino acids.

ATF5 is a transcription factor that contains a bZip domain.

== See also ==
- Activating transcription factor

== Interactions ==
ATF5 has been shown to interact with DISC1 and TRIB3.
