= CEP152 =

Protein-coding gene in the species Homo sapiens

Available structures
PDB	Ortholog search: PDBe RCSB
PDB	List of PDB id codes 4N7V

Identifiers
- Aliases: CEP152, MCPH4, MCPH9, SCKL5, centrosomal protein 152
- External IDs: OMIM: 613529; MGI: 2139083; HomoloGene: 37159; GeneCards: CEP152; OMA:CEP152 - orthologs

Gene location (Human)
Chr.	Chromosome 15 (human)
Band	15q21.1	Start	48,712,928 bp
Band	15q21.1	End	48,811,146 bp

Gene location (Mouse)
Chr.	Chromosome 2 (mouse)
Band	2|2 F1	Start	125,405,008 bp
Band	2|2 F1	End	125,467,033 bp
RNA expression pattern
Bgee	Human / Mouse (ortholog); Top expressed in: secondary oocyte; sperm; sural nerve; testicle; buccal mucosa cell; Achilles tendon; gonad; ventricular zone; bone marrow; trabecular bone / Top expressed in: choroidal fissure; saccule; otic vesicle; Paneth cell; medullary collecting duct; otic placode; secondary oocyte; hematopoietic cell; Jacobson's organ; epiblast; More reference expression data
BioGPS	n/a
Gene ontology
Molecular function	protein kinase binding; protein binding
Cellular component	deuterosome; cytosol; centriole; nucleoplasm; cytoplasm; pericentriolar material; microtubule organizing center; cytoskeleton; centrosome
Biological process	cell projection organization; G2/M transition of mitotic cell cycle; de novo centriole assembly involved in multi-ciliated epithelial cell differentiation; centrosome duplication; centriole replication; ciliary basal body-plasma membrane docking; regulation of G2/M transition of mitotic cell cycle
Sources:Amigo / QuickGO
Orthologs
Species	Human	Mouse
Entrez	22995	99100
Ensembl	ENSG00000103995	ENSMUSG00000068394
UniProt	O94986	A2AUM9
RefSeq (mRNA)	NM_001194998; NM_014985	NM_001081091
RefSeq (protein)	NP_001181927; NP_055800	NP_001074560
Location (UCSC)	Chr 15: 48.71 – 48.81 Mb	Chr 2: 125.41 – 125.47 Mb
PubMed search
- Wikidata
View/Edit Human	View/Edit Mouse

Centrosomal protein of 152 kDa, also known as Cep152, is a protein that in humans is encoded by the CEP152 gene. It is the ortholog of the Drosophila melanogaster gene asterless (asl) and both are required for centriole duplication.
