= ZNF839 =

Human gene and protein

Identifiers
- Aliases: ZNF839, C14orf131, zinc finger protein 839
- External IDs: MGI: 1920055; GeneCards: ZNF839

Gene location (Human)
Chr.	Chromosome 14 (human)
Band	14q32.31	Start	102,317,377 bp
Band	14q32.31	End	102,342,702 bp

Gene location (Mouse)
Chr.	Chromosome 12 (mouse)
Band	12|12 F1	Start	110,816,687 bp
Band	12|12 F1	End	110,836,430 bp
RNA expression pattern
Bgee	Human / Mouse (ortholog); Top expressed in: left testis; right testis; tendon of biceps brachii; right uterine tube; muscle of leg; gastrocnemius muscle; muscle of thigh; apex of heart; granulocyte; right lobe of liver / Top expressed in: primary oocyte; otolith organ; utricle; hand; ascending aorta; ureter; retinal pigment epithelium; medullary collecting duct; fossa; condyle; More reference expression data
BioGPS	n/a
Orthologs
Databases	NCBI: entry; OMA: entry
Species	Human	Mouse
Entrez	55778	72805
Ensembl	ENSG00000022976	ENSMUSG00000021271
UniProt	A8K0R7	n/a
RefSeq (mRNA)	NM_001267827; NM_001267828; NM_018335	NM_001199785; NM_028365
RefSeq (protein)	NP_001254756; NP_001254757; NP_060805	n/a
Location (UCSC)	Chr 14: 102.32 – 102.34 Mb	Chr 12: 110.82 – 110.84 Mb
PubMed search
- Wikidata
View/Edit Human	View/Edit Mouse

ZNF839 or zinc finger protein 839 is a protein which in humans is encoded by the ZNF839 gene. It is located on the long arm of chromosome 14. Zinc finger protein 839 is speculated to play a role in humoral immune response to cancer as a renal carcinoma antigen (NY-REN-50). This is because NY-REN-50 was found to be over expressed in cancer patients, especially those with renal carcinoma. Zinc finger protein 839 also plays a role in transcription regulation by metal-ion binding since it binds to DNA via C2H2-type zinc finger repeats.

== Gene ==
Zinc finger protein 839 conceptual translation with annotations depicting important domains, signals, and conserved sites.

The human ZNF839 gene is 25,326 nucleotides long and it encodes transcript variant 1 which is the longest isoform. The gene locus is 14q32.31 and it is found on the plus strand. ZNF839 consists of 8 exons, it encodes for one zinc finger repeat, and 3 disordered regions. The transcript variant 2 (isoform 2) is missing exon 1 so it has a downstream start codon.

== mRNA/transcript ==
The mRNA isoform 1 encoded by the human ZNF839 gene is 2992 nucleotides long. There are 9 isoforms of the ZNF839 mRNA.

Human ZNF839 Isoform Table
Isoform Number	Accession Number	mRNA Length (nt)	Protein Length (AA)	Molecular Weight (kDa)
1	NM_018335	2992	927	87.5
2	NM_001267827	2845	811	87.4
3	NM_001385065	2842	877	93.5
4	NM_001385069	3017	806	86.9
5	NM_001385070	2695	761	81.5
6	NM_001385071	2620	736	79.3
7	NM_001385072	2212	667	72.4
8	NM_001385073	2062	617	66.6
9	NM_001385076	2065	551	60.5

=== Expression ===
It has been found that there is high expression of ZNF839 in the testis, specifically the seminiferous tubules, after RNA-sequencing analysis of various human tissues. The high expression of the human ZNF839 gene in the testis may be due to its C2H2-zinc finger role in transcriptional regulation during spermatogenesis. Thus, zinc finger protein 839 role's as a transcription factor may be essential in regulating spermatogenesis. There is also high expression of zinc finger protein 839 in the various regions of the gyri in the brain. The high expression of ZNF839 in the gyri of the cerebrum may be due to the regulatory involvement of zinc finger proteins in neurodevelopment.

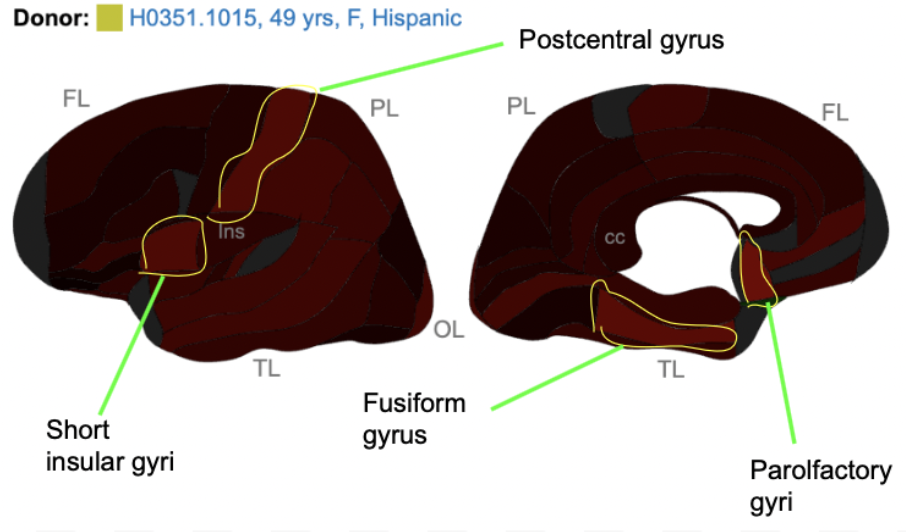
ZNF839 Expression in Various Regions of the Brain. The bright red areas represent high ZNF839 expression. The following gyri have high ZNF839 expression and high z-scores: short insular gyri, postcentral gyrus, fusiform gyrus, and parolfactory gyri. These images were annotated with the help of Allen Brain Atlas.

== Protein ==
The human zinc finger protein 839, isoform 1, has 927 amino acids and holds a molecular weight of 87.5 kDa. The predicted isoelectric point of zinc finger protein 839 is 6.18. This protein contains one zinc finger and one domain of unknown function (DUF) between amino acids 123-290. In isoforms 2-9, there is variability in the location of the DUF. The C2H2 zinc fingers in zinc finger protein 839 consist of cysteine and histidine residues that are conserved.

=== Subcellular localization ===
Zinc finger protein 839 is predicted to be localized to the nucleus due to its role as a transcription factor. The pat4 nuclear localization signal was conserved among all strict orthologs of the human zinc finger protein 839.

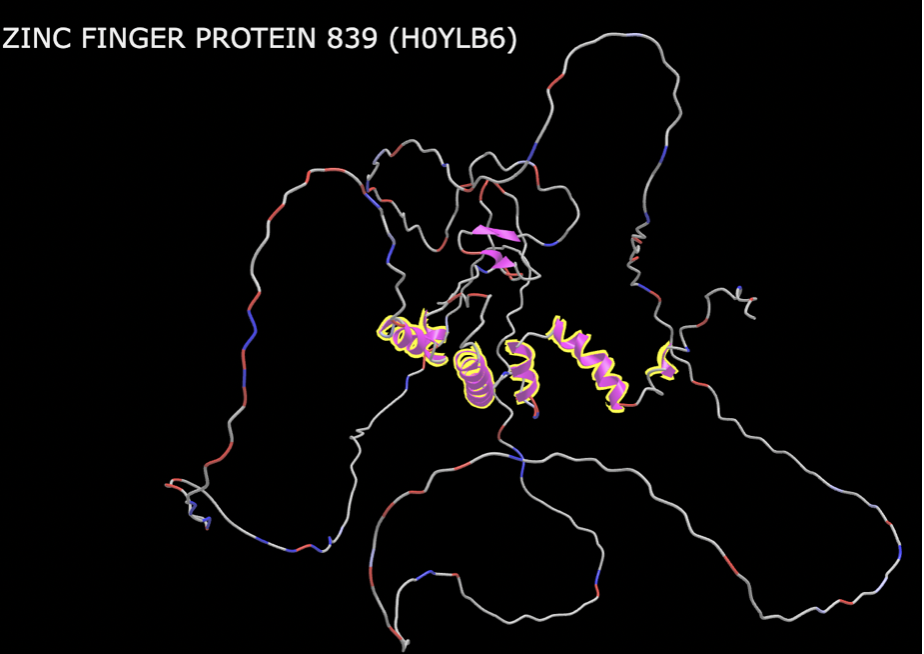
Zinc Finger Protein 839 Tertiary Structure. This structure was elucidated and annotated with the help of AlphaFold and iCN3D.

=== Tertiary structure ===
The human zinc finger protein 839 tertiary structure is predicted to have 5 alpha helices, one beta-sheet, and the rest of the protein consists of coils. Two of the alpha helices were found in two phosphorylation sites. The prevalence of negative and positive charges is mostly found in the coils.

== Function ==
=== Interacting proteins ===
Zinc finger protein 839 was found to have the following interacting proteins: TP53 (Tumor Protein p53), YWHAE (14-3-3 Protein Epsilon), YWHAZ (Tyrosine-3-monooxygenase), APP (amyloid beta precursor protein). It was found that YWHAE is involved in signal transduction pathways due to its binding of phosphoserine-containing proteins. Zinc finger protein 839 has many phosphorylation sites on serine residues since phosphorylation is one of the significant post-translational modifications that was found in ZNF839. Thus, YWHAE is able to interact with zinc finger protein 839 since it has multiple phosphoserines after post-translational modification. In addition, it was found that when a C2H2-zinc finger and p53 DNA binding domain fusion transcription factor was created, it increased the transcription of gene downstream of p53 such as p21, whose function is to arrest cell cycle in response to DNA damage. Thus, TP53 and zinc finger protein 839 may interact to transcribe genes necessary for DNA damage response or tumor suppression. Overall, it was observed that there is a pattern of zinc finger protein 839 interactions with tumor suppressor proteins and signal transduction regulators. Thus, zinc finger protein may significantly play a role in tumor suppression and regulation of cellular pathways such as cell division.

== Clinical significance ==
A relationship has been found between colorectal cancer patient survival and human ZNF839 expression. The appearance of rs11704 single nucleotide polymorphism (SNP) in the miRNA binding site of the 3' UTR within ZNF839 mRNA resulted in loss of miRNA binding site and leads to up-regulation of the human ZNF839 gene. The up-regulation of the ZNF839 gene results in decreased survival of colorectal cancer patients.

== Post-translational modifications ==
Zinc finger protein 839 has five phosphorylation sites and one sumoylation site. The kinases involved in the phosphorylation of zinc finger protein 839 include: Protein Kinase C, Casein Kinase II, and Casein Kinase I. These kinases play a role in activating transcription of genes involved in DNA repair, cell growth, and cell proliferation.

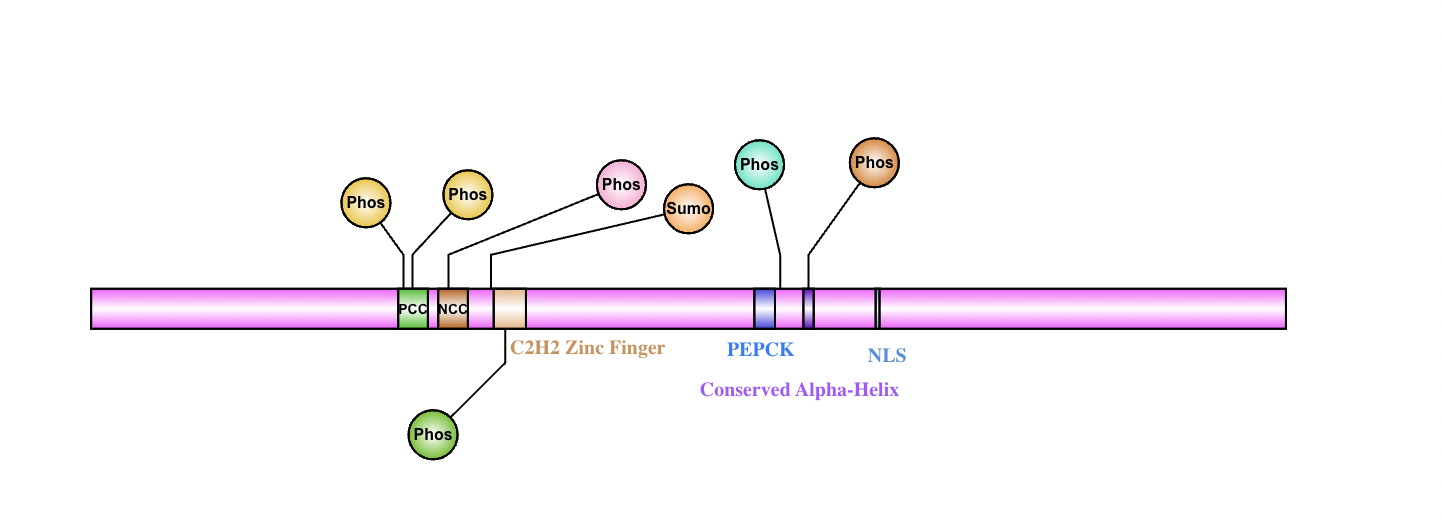
Zinc finger protein 839 schematic illustration showing phosphorylation sites (phos), sumoylation sites (sumo), negative charge cluster (NCC), positive charge cluster (PCC), C2H2 zinc finger, conserved alpha-helix region, and nuclear localization signal (NLS).

== Evolution ==
=== Orthologs ===
Zinc finger protein 839 is found only in vertebrates, not invertebrates. Zinc finger protein 839 is found in the following vertebrates: mammals, birds, reptiles, amphibians, and fish. Zinc Finger Protein 839 was approximately found to have first appeared in fish 462 million years ago. The sequence length for Japanese quail, white-collared manakin, lanner falcon, atlantic canary, central bearded dragon, and aeolian wall lizard have been trimmed for an accurate sequence identity.

Human ZNF839 Orthologs
ZNF839	Genus	Common name	Taxonomic group	Date of Divergence (MYA)	Accession number	Sequence length (aa)	Sequence similarity (%)	Sequence identity(%)
Mammal	Homo sapiens	Human	Primates	0	NP_060805	927	100	100
Mammal	Mus musculus	Mouse	Rodentia	87	NP_082641	921	61.5	49.8
Mammal	Hipposideros armiger	Great roundleaf bat	Chiroptera	94	XP_019494952	916	60.9	53.2
Mammal	Elephas maximus indicus	Indian Elephant	Proboscidea	99	XP_049755600	937	61.1	52.8
Mammal	Choloepus didactylus	Linnaeus's two-toed sloth	Pilosa	99	XP_037687739	940	60.4	52.5
Aves	Falco biarmicus	Lanner Falcon	Falconiformes	319	XP_056201354	1010	47.6	34.5
Aves	Serinus canaria	Atlantic canary	Passeriformes	319	XP_030095548	974	46.7	35
Aves	Manacus Candei	White-collared manakin	Passeriformes	319	XP_051625574	980	46.7	34.8
Aves	Coturnix japonica	Japanese quail	Galliformes	319	XP_015720921	931	44.3	33.2
Reptilia	Podarcis raffonei	Aeolian wall lizard	Squamata	319	XP_053226315	776	37.8	26.8
Reptilia	Pogona vitticeps	Central bearded dragon	Squamata	319	XP_020649269	669	37.6	27.3
Reptilia	Zootoca vivpara	Viviparous lizard	Squamata	319	XP_034961572	777	35.9	26.8
Reptilia	Sceloporus undulatus	Eastern Fence Lizard	Squamata	319	XP_042302042	696	35.8	25.1
Amphibians	Microcaecilia unicolor	Tiny cayenne caecillian	Gymnophiona	352	XP_030070400	1133	42.1	29.5
Amphibians	Geotrypetes seraphini	Gaboon caecillian	Gymnophiona	352	XP_033808581	1126	41.4	29.2
Amphibians	Bombina bombina	European fire-bellied toad	Anura	352	XP_053553408	937	38.8	27.6
Amphibians	Rana temporaria	Common Frog	Anura	352	XP_040188931	965	35.4	22.8
Fish	Callorhinchus milii	Australian ghostshark	Chimaeriformes	462	XP_042194042	1247	35.3	24.6
Fish	Leucoraja erinacea	Little skate	Rajiformes	462	XP_055497145	1256	34.9	23.3
Fish	Chiloscyllium plagiosum	Whitespotted bamboo shark	Orectolobiformes	462	XP_043553384	1269	33.9	22.9
Fish	Rhincodon typus	Whale shark	Orectolobiformes	462	XP_020377475	1265	33.1	23.3

=== Paralogs ===
Zinc finger protein 839 was found to have no paralogs.

== Evolution Rate ==
In addition. the ZNF839 gene is evolving at a fast rate, due to its evolution rate being close to fibrinogen alpha chain's rate than cytochrome C.

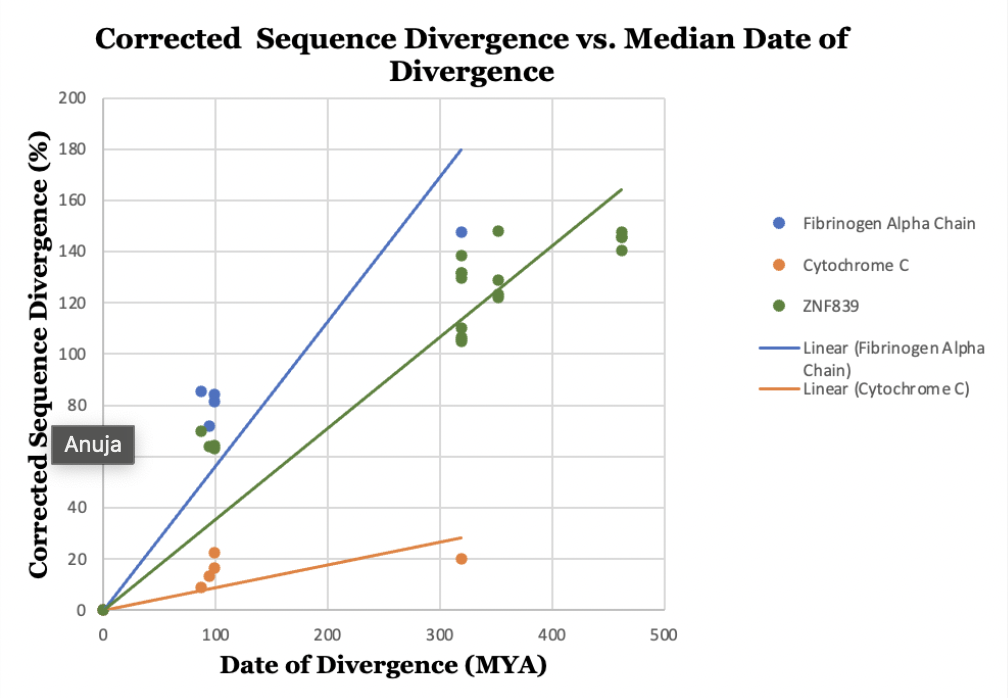
ZNF839 evolution rate graph
