= Silmitasertib =

Chemical compound

Clinical data
- Other names: CX-4945
- ATC code: None

Pharmacokinetic data
- Bioavailability: Orally bioavailable

Identifiers
- IUPAC name: 5-[(3-chlorophenyl)amino]benzo[c][2,6]naphthyridine-8-carboxylic acid
- CAS Number: 1009820-21-6
- PubChem CID: 24748573
- IUPHAR/BPS: 8126
- DrugBank: DB15408
- ChemSpider: 25057795
- UNII: C6RWP0N0L2
- ChEBI: CHEBI:232617
- ChEMBL: ChEMBL1230165
- PDB ligand: 3NG (PDBe, RCSB PDB)
- CompTox Dashboard (EPA): DTXSID40143602

Chemical and physical data
- Formula: C_{19}H_{12}ClN_{3}O_{2}
- Molar mass: 349.77 g·mol^{−1}
- 3D model (JSmol): Interactive image
- SMILES: C1=CC(=CC(=C1)Cl)NC2=C3C=CN=CC3=C4C=CC(=CC4=N2)C(=O)O
- InChI: InChI=InChI=1S/C19H12ClN3O2/c20-12-2-1-3-13(9-12)22-18-15-6-7-21-10-16(15)14-5-4-11(19(24)25)8-17(14)23-18/h1-10H,(H,22,23)(H,24,25); Key:MUOKSQABCJCOPU-UHFFFAOYSA-N

Silmitasertib (INN), codenamed CX-4945, is a small-molecule inhibitor of protein kinase CK2 (casein kinase II), a constitutively active serine/threonine-specific protein kinase that is overexpressed in several types of tumors.

Silmitasertib is in clinical trials for use as an adjunct to chemotherapy in the treatment of cholangiocarcinoma (bile duct cancer), is in phase I and II clinical trials for the treatment of recurrent Sonic Hedgehog (SHH) medulloblastoma, and in preclinical development for other cancers, including hematological and lymphoid malignancies.

In January 2017, it was granted orphan drug status by the U.S. Food and Drug Administration for advanced cholangiocarcinoma. It is being developed by Senhwa Biosciences of Taiwan.

== Mechanism of action ==
Silmitasertib interacts competitively with the ATP-binding site of CK2 subunit alpha. This leads to inhibition of several downstream signaling pathways, including PI3K/Akt.

== COVID-19 infections ==
In SARS-CoV-2 (COVID-19) infected Caco-2 cells, the phosphorylase activity of casein kinase 2 (CK2) is increased resulting in phosphorylation of several cytoskeletal proteins. These infected cells also display CK2-containing filopodia protrusions associated with budding viral particles. Hence the protrusions may assist the virus in infecting adjacent cells. In these same cells, the CK2 inhibitor silmitasertib displayed potent antiviral activity. Senhwa Biosciences and the US National Institutes of Health have announced that they will evaluate the efficacy of silmitasertib in treating COVID-19 infections.

== History ==
CX-4945 was originated by now-defunct Cylene Pharmaceuticals of San Diego, California, as the culmination of a lengthy process of rational, structure-based molecular modification of a lead compound known to have PARP inhibitor activity. Among a large series of compounds built around a benzo[c]-[2,6]naphthyridine-8-carboxylic acid scaffold, CX-4945 was chosen for its high potency and selectivity as an inhibitor of CK2.

Preclinical pharmacokinetics studies conducted in mice, rats, and dogs confirmed that CX-4945 had satisfactory bioavailability when given by mouth and did not block cytochrome P450, while experiments in mice confirmed its inhibition of solid-tumor growth in a dose-dependent manner.

Clinical trials in humans began in 2010, making CK-4945 the first CK2 inhibitor to reach this stage of drug development. The International Nonproprietary Name silmitasertib was proposed in 2010 and recommended by the World Health Organization in 2011.
