= Jordi Garcia Fernàndez =

Evolutionary biologist

Jordi Garcia Fernàndez Full Professor
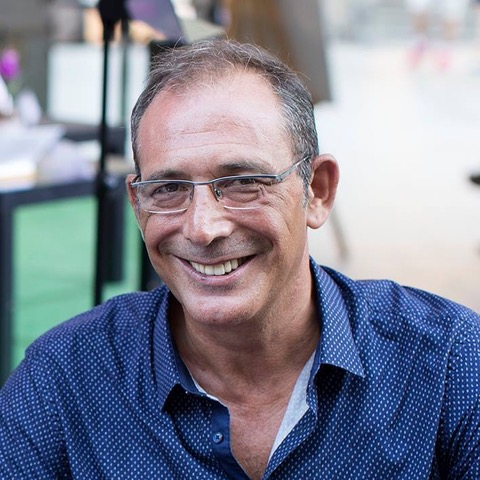
- Born: November 22, 1963 (age 62)
- Citizenship: Spanish
- Education: PhD, University of Barcelona; PostDoctoral research, University of Oxford
- Alma mater: University of Barcelona
- Scientific career
- Fields: Evo-Devo
- Workplaces: University of Barcelona, University of Oxford
- Thesis: "Aïllament, caracterització i anàlisi de l'expressió temporal i espacial de genes amb homeobox a planàries"
- Website: webgrec.ub.edu/webpages/personal/ang/004348_jordigarcia.ub.edu.html

Jordi Garcia Fernàndez (born 22 November 1963, Barcelona) is a biologist whose research focuses on how the novelties present in the key evolutionary transitions arouse during metazoan evolution. He is the current vice-rector of research at the University of Barcelona, and an Honorary Research Professor at the University of Oxford.

== Life and career ==
After finishing his grade studies, in 1992 he published his doctoral thesis under the supervision of Emili Saló i Boix in the University of Barcelona. Then he moved to Oxford for his Postdoctoral research to the lab of Peter Holland. In 1998, he published his research about the ParaHox gene cluster in a Nature paper with Peter Holland and Nina Brooke. In the year 2000, Jordi Garcia refused leading the European amphioxus genome project due to the poor state of research in Spain. In 2003 he obtained the position of full professor of genetics and in 2007 he was awarded the Honorary Research Professor of Merton College position (Oxford). After being elected as Head of Genetics Department in the University of Barcelona in 2015 and (after the departments fusion) of the Genetics, Microbiology and Statistics Department of the University of Barcelona in 2016, he became vice-rector of research of the University of Barcelona after the team led by Joan Guardia won the elections in December 2020. Alongside his career he has stablished long-term (national and international) collaborations such as with Peter Holland (Oxford), Manuel Irimia (Barcelona), Hector Escrivá (Banyuls-sur-mer) o Jaime Carvajal (Sevilla).

== Prizes and awards ==
- ICREA Academia, Generalitat de Catalunya, 2010
- Merton College Honorary Research Professor, desde 2007
- National habilitation to Full Professorships in Genetics, first call, 2003
- Distinction of the Generalitat de Catalunya for the promotion of University Research, proposed by Edward Lewis and Peter Holland, 2002
- Nominated for the prizes of the Human Frontiers organization, category postdoc, 1999
- Extraordinari Doctoral prize 1992/1993

== Scientific Societies ==
- Member of the council, Sociedad Española de Biología del Desarrollo, 2007–2016
- Member of the council, Sociedad Española de Biología Evolutiva, 2009–present
- Member of the council, Sociedad Española de Genética, 1998–2002
- Coordinator of the Developmental Biology Section of the Societat Catalana de Biologia (1998–2015)
- National Representative and council member of the European Society of Evolution and Development, 2007–2012

== Selected publications ==
The complete list of publications is available at https://webgrec.ub.edu/webpages/personal/ang/004348_jordigarcia.ub.edu.html

- Navas-Pérez, E.; Vicente-Garcia, C.; Mirra, S.; Burguera, D., Fernàndez-Castillo, N.; Ferrán, J.L.; López-Mayorga, M.; Alaiz-Noya, M.; Suárez-Pereira, I.; Antón-Galindo, E.; Ulloa, F.; Herrera-Úbeda, C.; Cuscó, P.; Falcón-Moya, R.; Rodríguez-Moreno, A.; D'Aniello, S.; Cormand, B.; Marfany, G.; Soriano, E.; Carrión, A.M.; Carvajal, J.J.; Garcia-Fernàndez, J. (2020). Characterisation of a eutherian gene cluster generated after transposon domestication identifies Bex3 as relevant for advanced neurological functions. Genome Biology . ISSN 1474-7596
- Herrera-Úbeda, C.; Martin-Barba, M.; Navas-Pérez, E.; Gravemeyer, J.; Albuixech-Crespo, B.; Wheeler, G.N.; Lizcano, JM.; Garcia-Fernàndez, J. (2019). Microsyntenic clusters reveal conservation of lncRNAs in Chordates despite absence of sequence Conservation. Biology, 8(3), p. 61 . Repositori Institucional . ISSN 2079-7737
- Zhong, Y., Herrera-Úbeda, C., Garcia-Fernàndez, J. et al. Mutation of amphioxus Pdx and Cdx demonstrates conserved roles for ParaHox genes in gut, anus and tail patterning. BMC Biol 18, 68 (2020). doi:10.1186/s12915-020-00796-2
- Irimia, M.; Denuc, A.; Burguera, D.; Somorjai, I.; Martín-Durán, J.; Genikovich, G.; Jiménez-Delgado, S.; Technau, U.; Roy, S.; Marfany, G.; Garcia-Fernàndez, J. (2011). Stepwise assembly of the nova-regulated alternative splicing network in the vertebrate brain. Proceedings of the National Academy of Sciences of the United States of America - PNAS, 108, pp. 5319 – 5324 . ISSN 0027-8424
- Putnam, N.; Butts, T.; Ferrier, D.E.K.; Furlong, R.F.; Hellsten, U.; Kawashima, T.; Robinson-Rechavi, M.; Shoguchi, E.; Terry, A.; Yu, J.K.; Benito-Gutiérrez, E.; Dubchak, I.; Garcia-Fernàndez, J.; Grigoriev, I.V.; Horton, A.V.; de Jong, P.J.; Jurka, J.; Kapitonov, V.; Kohara, Y.; Kuroki, Y.; Lindquist, E.; Lucas, S.; Osoegawa, K.; Pennachio, L.A.; Asaf Salamov, A.; Satou, Y.; Sauka-Spengler, T.; Schmutz, T.; Shin-I, T.; Toyoda, A.; Gibson-Brown, J.J.; Bronner-Fraser, M.; Fujiyama, M.; Holland, L.Z.; Holland, P.W.H.; Satoh, N.; Rokhsar, D.S. (2008). The amphiouxs genome and the evolution of the chordate karyotype. Nature, 453, pp. 1064 – 1071 . ISSN 0028-0836
- Garcia-Fernàndez, J. (2005). The genesis and evolution of homeobox gene clusters. Nature Reviews Genetics, 6, pp. 881 – 892 . ISSN 1471-0056
- Brooke, N.M.; Garcia-Fernandez, J.; Holland, P.W.H. (1998). The ParaHox gene cluster is an evolutionary sister of the Hox gene cluster. Nature, 392, pp. 920 – 922 . ISSN 0028-0836
- García-Fernández, J.; Marfany, G.; Baguñà, J.; Saló, E. (1993). Infiltration of mariner elements. Nature, 364(8), pp. 109 – 110 . ISSN 0028-0836

=== Books ===
- Garcia-Fernàndez, J.; Bueno, D. (2019). El embrión inconformista. Cómo influye en nuestra evolución el desarrollo embrionario . (pp. 1 – 200) . Universitat de Barcelona . ISBN 978-84-475-4078-5 . fitxa
- Garcia-Fernàndez, J.; Bueno D. (2016). L'embrió inconformista: Com influeix en la nostra evolució el desenvolupament embrionari . (pp. 1 – 181) . Edicions Universitat de Barcelona (UBe) / Ominscellula . ISBN 978-84-475-4005-1 .
- Bueno, D.; Parvas, M.; Hermelo,.I; Garcia-Fernàndez, J. (2016). Embryonic blood-cerebrospinal fluid barrier formation and function . En Ontogeny and Phylogeny of Brain Barrier Mechanisms . (pp. 42 – 53) . Frontiers Media . ISBN 978-2-88919-810-8 . ebook pdf
- García-Fernàndez, J; Benito-Gutiérrez, E. (2011). El petit amfiox: el miratge de l'origen dels vertebratsOrganismes model en Biologia. Treballs de la Societat Catalana de Biologia . En Organismes model en Biologia. Treballs de la Societat Catalana de Biologia . Volum. 62 . (pp. 131 – 139) . Societat Catalana de Biologia .
- Garcia-Fernàndez, J. (2000). La biologia del desenvolupament . En La Biologia a l'alba d'un nou mil.leni. Treballs de la Societat Catalana de Biologia . Volum. 50 . (pp. 213 – 223) . Societat Catalana de Biologia .
