= BTF3 =

Gene on human chromosome 5

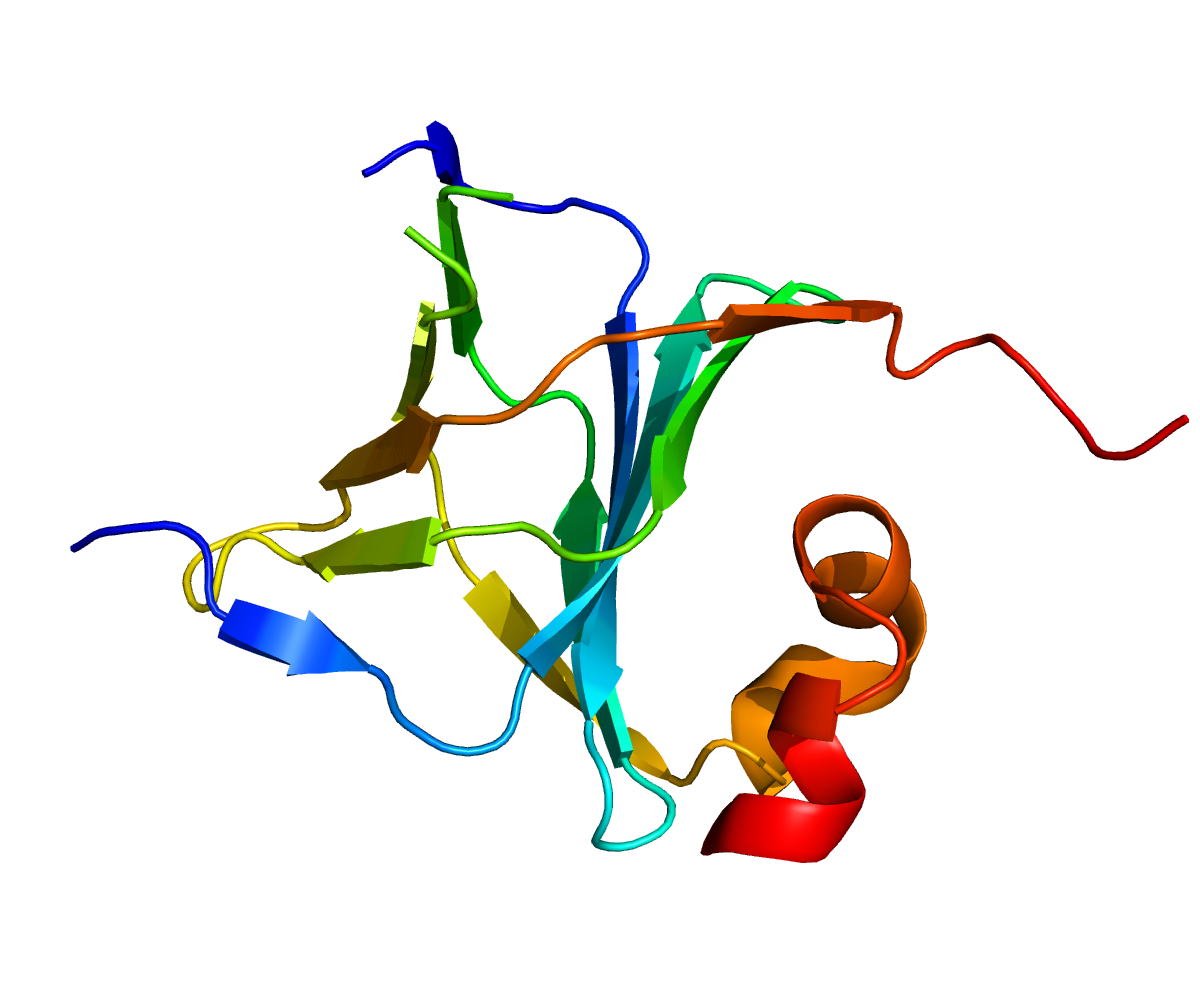

Identifiers
- Aliases: BTF3, BETA-NAC, BTF3a, BTF3b, NACB, basic transcription factor 3
- External IDs: OMIM: 602542; MGI: 1202875; GeneCards: BTF3
Available structures
PDB	Ortholog search: PDBe RCSB
PDB	List of PDB id codes 3LKX, 3MCB

Gene location (Human)
Chr.	Chromosome 5 (human)
Band	5q13.2	Start	73,498,408 bp
Band	5q13.2	End	73,505,667 bp

Gene location (Mouse)
Chr.	Chromosome 13 (mouse)
Band	13|13 D1	Start	98,446,404 bp
Band	13|13 D1	End	98,453,514 bp
RNA expression pattern
Bgee	Human / Mouse (ortholog); Top expressed in: mucosa of sigmoid colon; lactiferous duct; human penis; left ovary; embryo; vulva; ganglionic eminence; oral cavity; trabecular bone; cartilage tissue / Top expressed in: epiblast; lens; ventricular zone; ganglionic eminence; yolk sac; embryo; embryo; thymus; blastocyst; uterus; More reference expression data
BioGPS	n/a
Gene ontology
Molecular function	protein binding; RNA binding
Cellular component	cytoplasm; nucleus; cytosol; nascent polypeptide-associated complex; polysomal ribosome
Biological process	protein transport; in utero embryonic development; regulation of transcription, DNA-templated; transcription by RNA polymerase II; transcription, DNA-templated; transport
Sources:Amigo / QuickGO
Orthologs
Databases	NCBI: entry; OMA: entry
Species	Human	Mouse
Entrez	689	218490
Ensembl	ENSG00000145741	ENSMUSG00000021660
UniProt	P20290	Q64152
RefSeq (mRNA)	NM_001207; NM_001037637; NM_001393652; NM_001393653	NM_001170540; NM_145455
RefSeq (protein)	NP_001032726; NP_001198	NP_001164011; NP_663430
Location (UCSC)	Chr 5: 73.5 – 73.51 Mb	Chr 13: 98.45 – 98.45 Mb
PubMed search
- Wikidata
View/Edit Human	View/Edit Mouse

Basic transcription factor 3 is a eukaryotic protein that in humans is encoded by the BTF3 gene. They are very important to the development of many eukaryotic organisms such as in humans, plants, fungi, and protists. Some of the functions it plays a part in are gene expression regulation, cell proliferation control, protein homeostasis maintenance, and stress response modulation. BTF3 can be produced in both transcriptionally active and transcriptionally inactive forms through alternative splicing. This helps it to work in multiple cellular compartments and regulatory pathways.

BTF3 evolutionary conservation shows how important its involvement in gene control and cellular homeostasis is. Overtime, it's known for its role in cancer progression and metastasis. This includes gastric cancer, colorectal cancer, pancreatic ductal adenocarcinoma, and nasopharyngeal carcinoma.

More current studies has enhanced our understanding of BTF3 beyond its original designation as a generic transcription factor. Early biochemical studies indicated that BTF3 forms a stable, functional complex with RNA polymerase II, which is required for proper promoter binding and transcription initiation. BTF3 is the β-subunit of the Nascent Polypeptide-Associated Complex (NAC). It attaches to ribosomes at the nascent polypeptide exit tunnel, preventing premature interactions and protein misfolding. This establishes BTF3 as a key regulator of co-translational protein quality regulation.

== Properties ==
=== Structure ===
BTF3 is a compact α-helical protein of about 180-210 amino acids, which depend on the isoform produced. The protein has a three-dimensional structure and can be roughly classified into two functional regions. The first is the N-terminal region. This has about the first 90 amino acids and is responsible for BTF3's traditional classification as a transcription factor. Using cDNA sequencing and biochemical research, it was shown that BTF3 is needed for promoter binding and contributes to the development of the pre-initiation complex. The second is BTF3's C-terminal region, this has the β-NAC domain. It's an important structural and functional component of the Nascent Polypeptide-Associated Complex and it ranges from 90-200. The NAC complex binds to ribosomes near the polypeptide exit tunnel, which prevents fold error and promotes correct nascent-chain targeting.

In humans, there are two major isoforms, which are BTF3a and BTFb. The BTF3a is the longer protein that is transcriptionally active, while the BTFb is the shortened one that is transcriptionally inactive.

=== Composition ===
BTF3's amino acid composition has α-helical residues. In humans, BTF3 has leucine (9.9%), alanine (9.9%), and lysine (9.9%). There's a significant concentration of basic amino acids, lysine and arginine, especially in the N-terminal region. It allows interactions with DNA, transcriptional cofactors, and the acidic surfaces of the transcription machinery.

The C-terminal NAC region has hydrophobic and aromatic residues that are important for ribosome docking and stabilizing interactions with α-NAC. Post-translational changes to the protein affect its nuclear place as well as its interaction with partner proteins and having these changes likely affects the BTF3's actions.

=== Solubility ===
BTF3 is a soluble, α-helical protein that is stable under physiological buffer conditions. Its solubility was first shown during early purification operations, when BTF3 was successfully identified as a soluble transcription factor that remains in solution while building complexes with RNA polymerase II. A structural and biochemical investigation on NAC found that the β-NAC subunit is soluble and interacts to the ribosomal exit tunnel to avoid protein folding errors.

The ribosome-associated β-NAC component inhibits nascent chain targeting errors and remains soluble in physiological buffer conditions, contributing to the stability of NAC complexes, including BTF3's high solubility. BTF3 is a cytosolic/nuclear, soluble protein that lacks transmembrane helices and is distributed similarly to freely soluble transcription and chaperone proteins.

== Biological role ==
BTF3 has many important activities in eukaryotic cells, such as transcription, translation, and cellular growth regulation. Its most fundamental biological role was discovered in 1987 that showed that BTF3 forms a stable complex with RNA polymerase II and is important for proper transcription initiation. This meant that it helped in facilitating both the construction of the pre-initiation complex and the shift to early elongation. This discovery confirmed BTF3 as a fundamental universal transcription factor and gave the first molecular understanding of how BTF3 regulates gene expression at the promoter level.

The structural and biochemical investigations that has been done showed that β-NAC forms a stable heterodimer with α-NAC and dynamically associates with translating ribosomes to regulate protein maturation. So, in this function BTF3 connects transcriptional regulation to translational quality assurance. This works both upstream and downstream in gene expression pathways. This means that BTF3 also plays an important role in cell proliferation and cancer biology.

BTF3 affects the expression of cell cycle elated genes, for example the FOXM1, Ki-67, PCNA, and P27. When BTF3 was suppressed in gastric cancer cells, it lowered proliferation, delayed S- and G2/M-phases. It also increased apoptosis, and inhibited epithelial-mesenchymal transition (EMT). BTF3 increases EMT and metastatic potential by increasing the JAK2 or STAT3 signaling pathways. Having FOXM1, eliminates several of these cancer-related issues. This shows that BTF3 is a critical upstream regulator of this cancer-causing transcription factor. It supports normal cellular functions as well as contributes to pathogenic processes.

This demonstrates its importance in coordinating gene expression with cell development and survival. BTF3's significance in both essential biological processes and disease pathways explains why it exists in eukaryotic cells. Overall, it demonstrates how alterations in its expression can cause important developmental or pathological outcomes.

== Interactions ==
BTF3 has been shown to interact with CSNK2B.

BTF3 had been shown to interact is BMI1. Most recently it shows that it sustains prostate cancer stemness.

BTF3 directly interacts with FOXM1, this promotes proliferation and glycolysis in hepatocellular carcinoma (HCC) cells.

BTF3 binds to the PDCD2L promoter and stimulates transcription in hepatocellular cancer. BTF3 binds to the PDCD2L proximal promoter and increases transcription, connecting BTF3 to a significant proliferation and apoptosis regulating mechanism in liver cancer.

BTF3 functionally interacts with p53-associated signaling via PDCD2L. By raising PDCD2L, BTF3 indirectly suppresses p53 pathway activity, lowering p53, p21, and Bax levels while increasing Bcl-2. This puts BTF3 in an important position in balancing survival and death.

BTF3 controls the JAK2/STAT3 signaling pathway, which controls cell migration, invasion, and EMT. Loss of BTF3 lowers JAK2 and STAT3 phosphorylation, but IL-6 stimulation restores pathway activity and rescues EMT markers, showing that BTF3 maintains STAT3-driven metastatic behaviors.

== Regulations ==
- BTF3 regulates important cell-cycle regulators through the FOXM1 pathway. In gastric cancer, BTF3 regulates FOXM1 gene expression, which then regulates Ki-67, PCNA, and p27. BTF3 loss causes stunted growth and death, but FOXM1 production rescues these deficiencies.
- Regulation of PDCD2L and the p53 pathway BTF3 increases PDCD2L, which inhibits the p53 axis. When BTF3 or PDCD2L are suppressed, p53, p21, and Bax rise, while Bcl-2 falls. This restores pro-apoptotic signaling. This identifies BTF3 as a key regulator of p53-dependent stress and survival pathways.
- BTF3 regulates the JAK2/STAT3 signaling axis, which controls EMT and metastatic behavior. When BTF3 is silenced, JAK2 and STAT3s break down. This results in decreased EMT and impaired migration. Yet, IL-6 stimulation can restore STAT3 activation, proving that BTF3 modulates EMT states through cytokine-responsive signaling pathways.
- BTF3 regulates EMT-related transcriptional states.
- In hepatocellular carcinoma, BTF3 transcriptionally promotes PDCD2L, which influences p53 signaling.
- BTF3 increases transcriptional initiation by participating in the general TFII machinery
- Coordination of transcription and translation: BTF3 regulates both promoter-level transcription and ribosome-associated protein maturation, helping it to integrate upstream gene expression with downstream proteostasis.
- Regulation of apoptosis and cell-cycle transitions: BTF3 regulates transitions through S and G2/M phases in cancer cells by acting on PDCD2L, FOXM1, and downstream p53 signaling. It also affects proliferation marker expression and defines apoptotic thresholds.
- Regulation of invasion and migration BTF3 knockdown reduces invasive and migratory threat by modifying EMT-related transcriptional outputs, such as enhanced E-cadherin and decreased N-cadherin and ZEB2.
