= NACA (gene) =

Protein-coding gene in humans

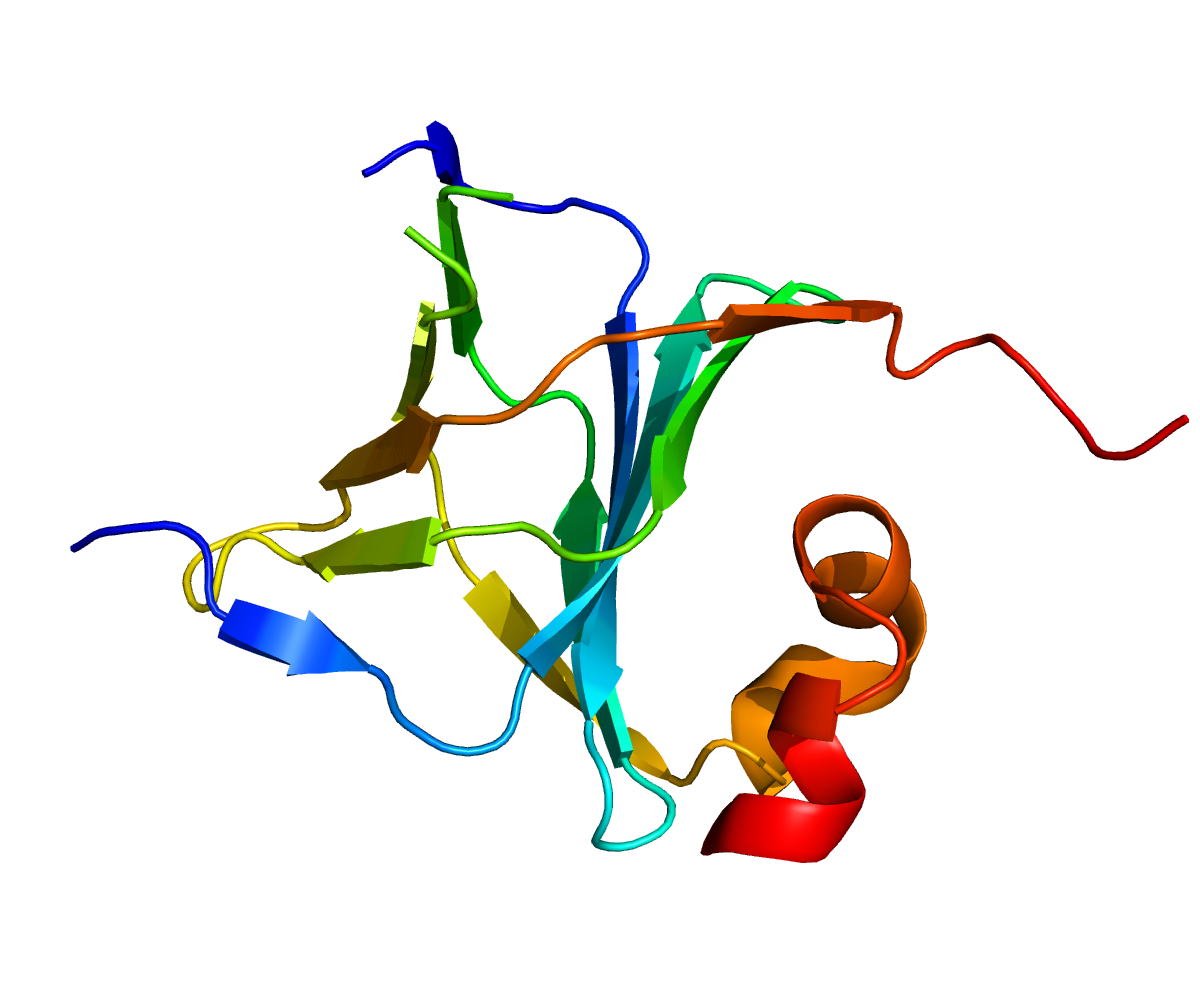
Available structures
PDB	Ortholog search: PDBe RCSB
PDB	List of PDB id codes 3LKX, 3MCB, 3MCE

Identifiers
- Aliases: NACA, NACA1, skNAC, HSD48, NAC-alpha, nascent polypeptide-associated complex alpha subunit, nascent polypeptide associated complex subunit alpha
- External IDs: OMIM: 601234; MGI: 106095; HomoloGene: 136025; GeneCards: NACA; OMA:NACA - orthologs

Gene location (Human)
Chr.	Chromosome 12 (human)
Band	12q13.3	Start	56,712,305 bp
Band	12q13.3	End	56,731,628 bp

Gene location (Mouse)
Chr.	Chromosome 10 (mouse)
Band	10|10 D3	Start	127,871,444 bp
Band	10|10 D3	End	127,884,506 bp
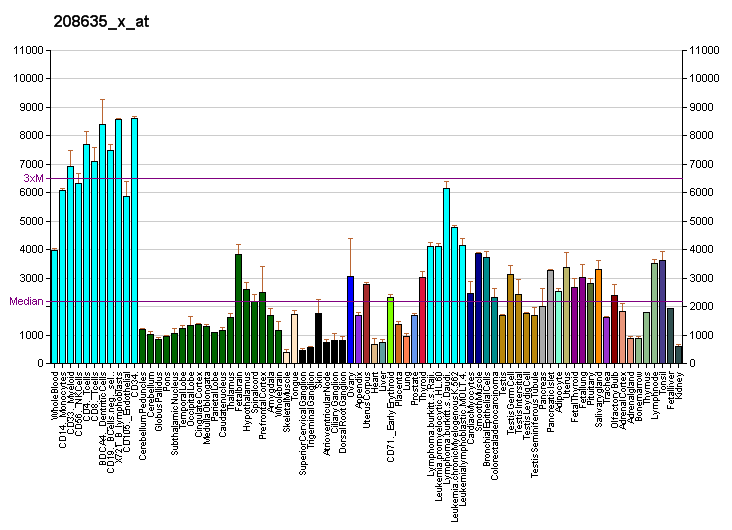

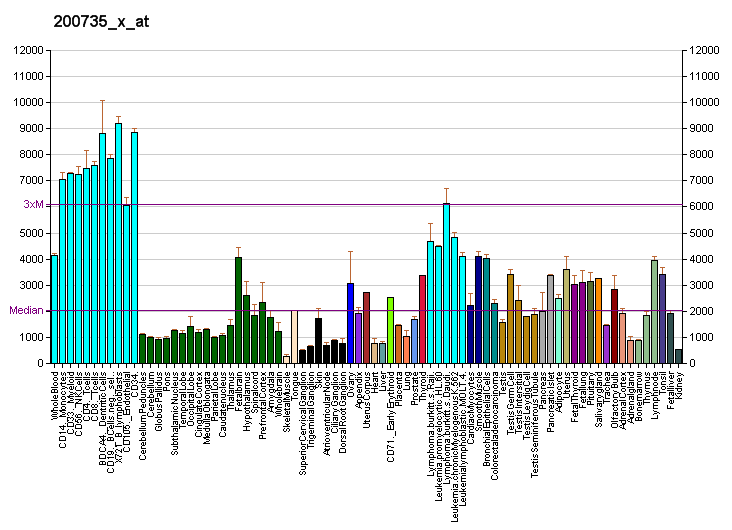
RNA expression pattern
Bgee	Human / Mouse (ortholog); Top expressed in: tendon of biceps brachii; skin of arm; lactiferous duct; epithelium of nasopharynx; skin of hip; Achilles tendon; parietal pleura; skin of thigh; germinal epithelium; caput epididymis / Top expressed in: ventricular zone; epiblast; blastocyst; ovary; embryo; lens; ganglionic eminence; embryo; thymus; uterus; More reference expression data
BioGPS	More reference expression data
Gene ontology
Molecular function	DNA binding; transcription coactivator activity; protein binding
Cellular component	cytoplasm; nucleus; nascent polypeptide-associated complex; extracellular exosome
Biological process	transcription, DNA-templated; regulation of transcription, DNA-templated; protein transport; regulation of skeletal muscle fiber development; cardiac ventricle development; heart trabecula morphogenesis; positive regulation of cell proliferation involved in heart morphogenesis; viral process; skeletal muscle tissue regeneration; protein biosynthesis; positive regulation of skeletal muscle tissue growth; negative regulation of striated muscle cell apoptotic process; transport
Sources:Amigo / QuickGO
Orthologs
Species	Human	Mouse
Entrez	4666	17938
Ensembl	ENSG00000196531	ENSMUSG00000061315
UniProt	Q13765	P70670; Q60817
RefSeq (mRNA)	NM_001113201; NM_001113202; NM_001113203; NM_005594; NM_001320193 NM_001320194; NM_001365896	NM_001113199; NM_001282976; NM_013608
RefSeq (protein)	NP_001106672; NP_001106673; NP_001106674; NP_001307122; NP_001307123 NP_005585; NP_001106672; NP_001106673; NP_001106674; NP_001307122; NP_001307123; NP_005585	NP_001106670; NP_001269905; NP_038636; NP_001269905.1; NP_038636.2
Location (UCSC)	Chr 12: 56.71 – 56.73 Mb	Chr 10: 127.87 – 127.88 Mb
PubMed search
- Wikidata
View/Edit Human	View/Edit Mouse

Nascent-polypeptide-associated complex alpha polypeptide, also known as NACA, is a protein which in humans is encoded by the NACA gene.

== Function ==
NACA prevents short recently synthesized (i.e., nascent) ribosome-associated polypeptides from inappropriate interactions with cytosolic proteins. NACA binds nascent-polypeptide domains emerging from ribosomes unless it contains a signal peptide which is fully exposed. Depletion of NACA from ribosomes carrying nascent polypeptides allows the signal recognition particle (SRP) to crosslink to polypeptides regardless of whether or not they contain signal peptides or not. In the absence of NACA, proteins lacking signal peptides can be mis-translocated into the endoplasmic reticulum.

The NACA protein is expressed in bone during development and acts as a transcriptional coactivator in conjunction with acidic activators.

== Interactions ==
NACA has been shown to interact with BTF3, FADD, C-jun, and 3 members of taxilin family.
