= CDC25B =

Protein-coding gene in humans

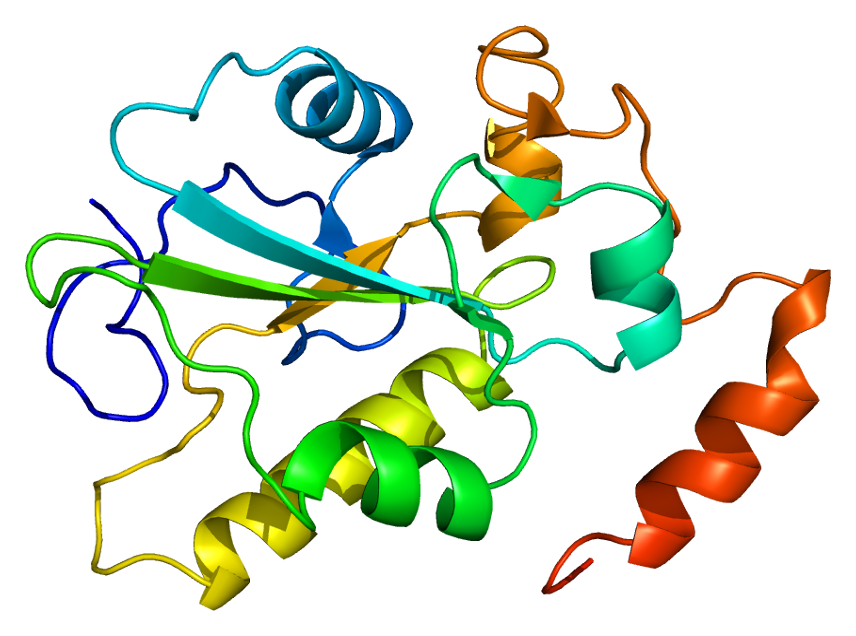

Identifiers
- Aliases: CDC25B, cell division cycle 25B
- External IDs: OMIM: 116949; MGI: 99701; GeneCards: CDC25B
Available structures
PDB	Ortholog search: PDBe RCSB
PDB	List of PDB id codes 1CWR, 1CWS, 1CWT, 1QB0, 1YM9, 1YMD, 1YMK, 1YML, 1YS0, 2A2K, 2IFD, 2IFV, 2UZQ, 3FQT, 3FQU, 4WH7, 4WH9
Enzyme activity
EC #	BRENDA	ExPASy	KEGG	MetaCyc
3.1.3.48	↗	↗	↗	↗

Gene location (Human)
Chr.	Chromosome 20 (human)
Band	20p13	Start	3,786,772 bp
Band	20p13	End	3,806,121 bp

Gene location (Mouse)
Chr.	Chromosome 2 (mouse)
Band	2 F1|2 63.29 cM	Start	131,028,869 bp
Band	2 F1|2 63.29 cM	End	131,040,417 bp
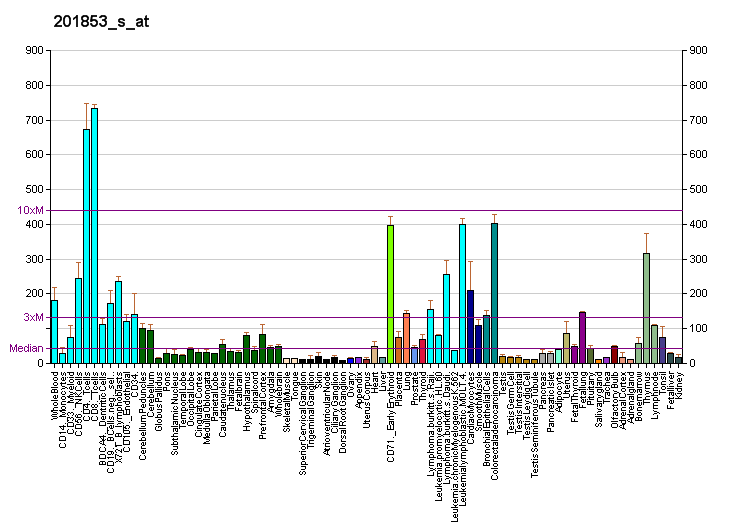
RNA expression pattern
Bgee	Human / Mouse (ortholog); Top expressed in: granulocyte; right lung; right hemisphere of cerebellum; gastric mucosa; upper lobe of left lung; oocyte; stromal cell of endometrium; secondary oocyte; lymph node; anterior pituitary / Top expressed in: fetal liver hematopoietic progenitor cell; blood; tibiofemoral joint; ventricular zone; lip; human fetus; spleen; thymus; granulocyte; zygote; More reference expression data
BioGPS	More reference expression data
Gene ontology
Molecular function	protein binding; protein tyrosine phosphatase activity; hydrolase activity; protein kinase binding; phosphoprotein phosphatase activity
Cellular component	cytosol; centrosome; spindle pole; intracellular anatomical structure; microtubule organizing center; cytoskeleton; nucleus; nucleoplasm; cytoplasm
Biological process	protein dephosphorylation; positive regulation of mitotic cell cycle; cell division; positive regulation of cytokinesis; protein phosphorylation; G2/M transition of mitotic cell cycle; oocyte maturation; positive regulation of cell population proliferation; cell cycle; female meiosis I; positive regulation of protein kinase activity; peptidyl-tyrosine dephosphorylation; positive regulation of cell cycle G2/M phase transition; mitotic cell cycle; positive regulation of G2/M transition of mitotic cell cycle; positive regulation of G2/MI transition of meiotic cell cycle
Sources:Amigo / QuickGO
Orthologs
Databases	NCBI: entry; OMA: entry
Species	Human	Mouse
Entrez	994	12531
Ensembl	ENSG00000101224	ENSMUSG00000027330
UniProt	P30305	P30306
RefSeq (mRNA)	NM_001287516; NM_001287517; NM_001287518; NM_001287519; NM_001287520 NM_001287522; NM_001287524; NM_004358; NM_021872; NM_021873; NM_021874; NM_212530	NM_001111075; NM_023117
RefSeq (protein)	NP_001274445; NP_001274446; NP_001274447; NP_001274448; NP_001274449 NP_001274451; NP_001274453; NP_004349; NP_068658; NP_068659	NP_001104545; NP_075606
Location (UCSC)	Chr 20: 3.79 – 3.81 Mb	Chr 2: 131.03 – 131.04 Mb
PubMed search
- Wikidata
View/Edit Human	View/Edit Mouse

M-phase inducer phosphatase 2 is an enzyme that in humans is encoded by the CDC25B gene.

CDC25B is a member of the Cdc25 family of phosphatases. CDC25B activates the cyclin dependent kinase CDC2 by removing two phosphate groups and it is required for entry into mitosis. CDC25B shuttles between the nucleus and the cytoplasm due to nuclear localization and nuclear export signals. The protein is nuclear in the M and G_{1} phases of the cell cycle and moves to the cytoplasm during S and G_{2}. CDC25B has oncogenic properties, although its role in tumor formation has not been determined. Multiple transcript variants for this gene exist.

== Interactions ==
CDC25B has been shown to interact with MAPK14, Casein kinase 2, alpha 1, CHEK1, MELK, Estrogen receptor alpha, YWHAB, YWHAZ, YWHAH and YWHAE.
