= Okur–Chung neurodevelopmental syndrome =

Human disease

Okur-Chung Neurodevelopmental Syndrome (OCNDS) is an ultra-rare neurodevelopmental syndrome first discovered in 2016. It is believed to occur in around 1 in 100,000 live births. OCNDS is caused by pathogenic variants in the CSNK2A1 gene.

== Symptoms ==
Individuals with Okur–Chung neurodevelopmental syndrome (OCNDS) commonly show global developmental delay, intellectual disability, hypotonia, and speech and language impairment. Some individuals are non-verbal. Developmental milestones are often delayed. Independent walking is typically achieved later than average. Most children walk by 18 months in the general population, while the mean reported age in OCNDS is about 30.6 months. First spoken words also tend to occur later. Around 60% of affected individuals do not speak their first words until after 18 months. Typical first word use is around 12 months in most children, with up to 16 months considered within the normal range.

Neurological features are frequent. Global developmental delay and intellectual disability are commonly reported neurological symptoms. Approximately a third of patients present with a smaller head circumference (microcephaly). Seizures occur in roughly one-third of patients and may present as generalized tonic–clonic seizures, infantile spasms, absence seizures, atonic seizures, and focal seizures, with an average onset near 2 years of age. Behavioral and neurodevelopmental conditions such as autism spectrum disorder, attention-deficit/hyperactivity disorder (ADHD), and behavioral dysregulation (e.g., aggression, tantrums) related to communication challenges have been reported.

Musculoskeletal and growth-related findings include hypotonia as a common presentation. Scoliosis and kyphosis can occur. Nearly half of affected individuals have short stature. Some exhibit a partial growth hormone deficiency.

Several other body systems may be involved. Gastrointestinal issues are common. Constipation is most frequently reported, and some infants experience feeding difficulties that can lead to gastrostomy tube placement. Immune-related issues include recurrent minor infections. Some individuals show low immunoglobulin levels (for example IgG or IgA deficiency) and require intravenous immunoglobulin treatment. Ophthalmologic manifestations include astigmatism and strabismus. Genitourinary anomalies vary and can include ectopic kidney, duplicated renal collecting system, pelvicaliectasia, labial adhesions , and undescended testes. Cardiovascular findings reported in a minority of cases include pulmonary valve abnormalities, atrial septal defect, tetralogy of Fallot, and aortic root dilation.

Dental anomalies have been described in primary teeth. Reported findings include cracked teeth, unusually long incisors, enamel defects, fused teeth, and microdontia.

== Causes ==
=== Inheritance ===
The majority of cases are de novo however, inherited cases have been observed. Inheritance occurs via an autosomal dominant inheritance pattern.

=== Genetics ===
Volkan Okur and Wendy Chung discovered OCNDS in 2016. OCNDS is a genetic disorder with an autosomal dominant pattern of inheritance. Most cases are sporadic mutations. The causative gene is CSNK2A1, located on chromosome 20. CSNK2A1 encodes for the protein Casein Kinase 2 alpha 1 (CK2α), the alpha catalytic subunit of a critical kinase protein in the body. Different types of pathogenic variants exist in OCNDS including:

- Missense variants - these are the most represented type of mutation in OCNDS
- Nonsense variants
- Protein truncating variants
- Splice site variants
- Gene deletions - ranging from partial to full gene deletion

== Diagnosis ==
Currently, OCNDS can only be diagnosed through genetic sequencing (e.g., whole exome sequencing, whole genome sequencing, select panels at genetic testing labs). Testing is initiated for individuals who have suggestive findings for OCNDS.

== Treatment ==
There is currently no curative treatment for OCNDS. Management focuses on supportive care and early intervention to address developmental, behavioral, and medical needs. Children often receive speech, occupational, and physical therapy. Some may also benefit from music or equine-assisted therapy. Augmentative and alternative communication (AAC) devices are frequently used to support communication. Standard anti-seizure medications are used when epilepsy is present. Many children require individualized educational support through an Individualized Education Program (IEP). Ongoing surveillance is recommended to monitor growth, nutrition and feeding concerns, constipation, developmental progress, infections, sleep disturbances, vision issues, and emerging symptoms such as seizures or changes in motor, coordination, or behavioral functioning.

== Epidemiology ==
OCNDS is observed in males and females alike. The prevalence is around 1 in 100,000 live births.

An ICD-10 Code has been proposed for OCNDS and is currently under review.

== Resources ==
A patient advocacy organization exists to support individuals and families called the CSNK2A1 Foundation.
