= Casein kinase 2 =

Protein

Casein kinase 2 (EC 2.7.11.1)(CK2/CSNK2) is a serine/threonine-selective protein kinase that has been implicated in cell cycle control, DNA repair, regulation of the circadian rhythm, and other cellular processes. De-regulation of CK2 has been linked to tumorigenesis as a potential protection mechanism for mutated cells. Proper CK2 function is necessary for survival of cells as no knockout models have been successfully generated.

== Structure ==
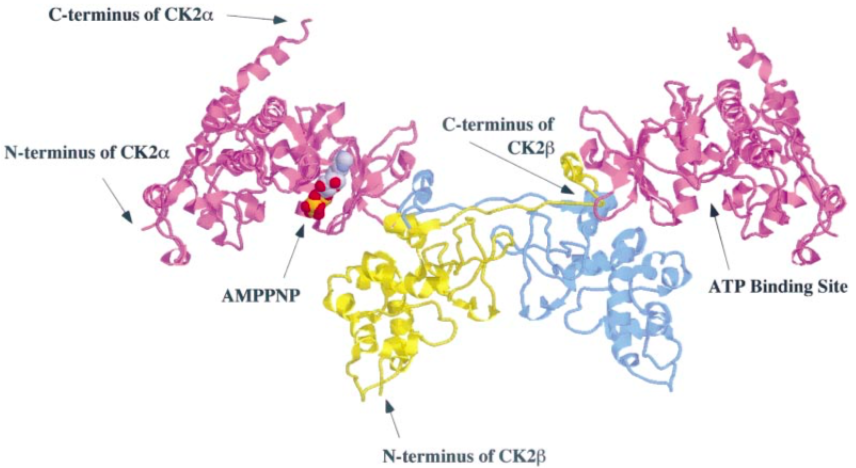
Ribbon structure of CK2 tetramer containing two α and two β subunits

CK2 typically appears as a tetramer of two α subunits; α being 42 kDa and α’ being 38 kDa, and two β subunits, each weighing in at 28 kDa. The β regulatory domain only has one isoform and therefore within the tetramer will have two β subunits. The catalytic α domains appear as an α or α’ variant and can either be formed in a homodimer (α & α, or α’ & α’) formation or heterodimer formation (α & α’). Other β isoforms have been found in other organisms but not in humans.

The α subunits do not require the β regulatory subunits to function, this allows dimers to form of the catalytic domains independent of β subunit transcription. The presence of these α subunits does have an effect on the phosphorylation targets of CK2. A functional difference between α and α’ has been found but the exact nature of differences isn't fully understood yet. An example is that Caspase 3 is preferentially phosphorylated by α’ based tetramers over α based tetramers.

== Function ==
CK2 is a protein kinase responsible for phosphorylation of substrates in various pathways within a cell; ATP or GTP can be used as phosphate source. CK2 has a dual functionality with involvement in cell growth/proliferation and suppression of apoptosis. CK2s anti-apoptotic function is in the continuation of the cell cycle; from G1 to S phase and G2 to M phase checkpoints. This function is achieved by protecting proteins from caspase-mediated apoptosis via phosphorylation of sites adjacent to the caspase cleavage site, blocking the activity of caspase proteins. CK2 also protects from drug-induced apoptosis via similar methods but it is not as well understood. Knockdown studies of both α and α’ sub-units have been used to verify this anti-apoptotic function.

Important phosphorylation events also regulated by CK2 are found in DNA damage repair pathways, and multiple stress-signaling pathways. Examples are phosphorylation of p53 or MAPK, which both regulate many interactions within their respective cellular pathways.

Another indication of separate function of α subunits is that mice that lack CK2α’ have a defect in the morphology of developing sperm.

== Regulation ==
Although the targets of CK2 are predominantly nucleus-based the protein itself is localized to both the nucleus and cytoplasm. Casein kinase 2 activity has been reported to be activated following Wnt signaling pathway activation. A Pertussis toxin-sensitive G protein and Dishevelled appear to be an intermediary between Wnt-mediated activation of the Frizzled receptor and activation of CK2. Further studies need to be done on the regulation of this protein due to the complexity of CK2 function and localization.

Phosphorylation of CK2α T344 has been shown to inhibit its proteasomal degradation and support binding to Pin1. O-GlcNAcylation at S347 antagonizes this phosphorylation and accelerates CK2α degradation. O-GlcNAcylation of CK2α has also been shown to alter the phosphoproteome, notably including many chromatin regulators such as HDAC1, HDAC2, and HCFC1.

== Role in tumorigenesis ==
Among the array of substrates that can be altered by CK2 many of them have been found in increased prevalence in cancers of the breast, lung, colon, and prostate. An increased concentration of substrates in cancerous cells infers a likely survival benefit to the cell, and activation of many of these substrates requires CK2. As well the anti-apoptotic function of CK2 allows the cancerous cell to escapes cell death and continue proliferating. Having roles in cell cycle regulation may also indicate CK2's role in allowing cell cycle progression when normally it should have been ceased. This also promotes CK2 as a possible therapeutic target for cancer drugs. When added with other potent anti-cancer therapies, a CK2 inhibitor may increase the effectiveness of the other therapy by allowing drug-induced apoptosis to occur at a normal rate.

== Role in viral infection ==
In SARS-CoV-2 (COVID-19) infected Caco-2 cells, the phosphorylase activity of CK2 is increased resulting in phosphorylation of several cytoskeletal proteins. These infected cells also display CK2-containing filopodia protrusions associated with budding viral particles. Hence the protrusions may assist the virus in infecting adjacent cells. In these same cells, the CK2 inhibitor silmitasertib displayed potent antiviral activity. Senhwa Biosciences and the US National Institutes of Health have announced that they will evaluate the efficacy of silmitasertib in treating COVID-19 infections.

== Role in neurodevelopment ==
Mutations in either CK2α (gene: CSNK2A1) or CK2β (gene: CSNK2B) lead to neurodevelopmental disorders: Okur-Chung neurodevelopmental syndrome and Poirier-Bienvenu neurodevelopmental syndrome, respectively. Both subunits are critical to maintain synapses and likely play a role in neuronal differentiation. This role is further supported by the finding that CK2α null mice exhibit issues with neural tube formation.

== Protein subunits ==
casein kinase 2, alpha 1 polypeptide

Identifiers
- Symbol: CSNK2A1
- NCBI gene: 1457
- HGNC: 2457
- OMIM: 115440
- RefSeq: NM_001895
- UniProt: P68400

Other data
- EC number: 2.7.11.1
- Locus: Chr. 20 p13
Search for
- Structures: Swiss-model
- Domains: InterPro

casein kinase 2, alpha prime polypeptide

Identifiers
- Symbol: CSNK2A2
- NCBI gene: 1459
- HGNC: 2459
- OMIM: 115442
- RefSeq: NM_001896
- UniProt: P19784

Other data
- EC number: 2.7.11.1
- Locus: Chr. 16
Search for
- Structures: Swiss-model
- Domains: InterPro

casein kinase 2, beta polypeptide

Identifiers
- Symbol: CSNK2B
- NCBI gene: 1460
- HGNC: 2460
- OMIM: 115441
- RefSeq: NM_001320
- UniProt: P67870

Other data
- EC number: 2.7.11.1
- Locus: Chr. 6 p21.3
Search for
- Structures: Swiss-model
- Domains: InterPro

== See also ==
- CSNK2A1
- CSNK2A2
- Casein kinase 1 — a distinct protein kinase family
