= MELK =

Protein-coding gene in the species Homo sapiens

Identifiers
- Aliases: MELK, HPK38, maternal embryonic leucine zipper kinase
- External IDs: OMIM: 607025; MGI: 106924; GeneCards: MELK
Available structures
PDB	Ortholog search: PDBe RCSB
PDB	List of PDB id codes 4BKY, 4BKZ, 4D2P, 4D2T, 4D2V, 4D2W, 4IXP, 4UMP, 4UMQ, 4UMR, 4UMT, 4UMU, 5IHA, 5IHC, 5IH9, 5IH8
Enzyme activity
EC #	BRENDA	ExPASy	KEGG	MetaCyc
2.7.10.2	↗	↗	↗	↗
2.7.11.1	↗	↗	↗	↗

Gene location (Human)
Chr.	Chromosome 9 (human)
Band	9p13.2	Start	36,572,862 bp
Band	9p13.2	End	36,677,683 bp

Gene location (Mouse)
Chr.	Chromosome 4 (mouse)
Band	4 B1|4 23.46 cM	Start	44,300,876 bp
Band	4 B1|4 23.46 cM	End	44,364,675 bp
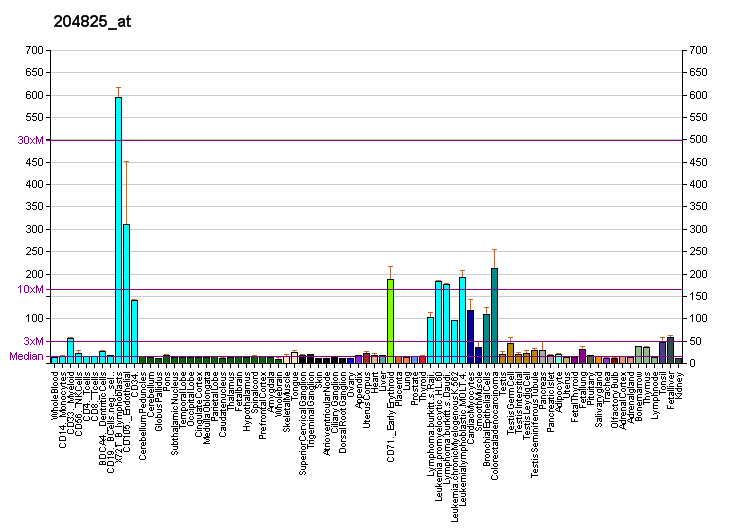
RNA expression pattern
Bgee	Human / Mouse (ortholog); Top expressed in: secondary oocyte; ventricular zone; embryo; ganglionic eminence; amniotic fluid; gonad; testicle; gingival epithelium; tibia; trabecular bone / Top expressed in: primitive streak; abdominal wall; primary oocyte; dermis; ureter; endocardial cushion; maxillary prominence; medial ganglionic eminence; right lobe of liver; somite; More reference expression data
BioGPS	More reference expression data
Gene ontology
Molecular function	transferase activity; nucleotide binding; calcium ion binding; protein kinase activity; non-membrane spanning protein tyrosine kinase activity; kinase activity; protein serine/threonine kinase activity; protein binding; ATP binding; lipid binding
Cellular component	cytoplasm; membrane; plasma membrane; cell cortex; nucleus
Biological process	intrinsic apoptotic signaling pathway in response to oxidative stress; hemopoiesis; intracellular signal transduction; phosphorylation; protein phosphorylation; G2/M transition of mitotic cell cycle; neural precursor cell proliferation; positive regulation of apoptotic process; protein autophosphorylation; cell cycle; cell population proliferation; apoptotic process; peptidyl-tyrosine phosphorylation
Sources:Amigo / QuickGO
Orthologs
Databases	NCBI: entry; OMA: entry
Species	Human	Mouse
Entrez	9833	17279
Ensembl	ENSG00000165304	ENSMUSG00000035683
UniProt	Q14680	Q61846
RefSeq (mRNA)	NM_001256685; NM_001256687; NM_001256688; NM_001256689; NM_001256690 NM_001256691; NM_001256692; NM_001256693; NM_014791	NM_010790
RefSeq (protein)	NP_001243614; NP_001243616; NP_001243617; NP_001243618; NP_001243619 NP_001243620; NP_001243621; NP_001243622; NP_055606	NP_034920
Location (UCSC)	Chr 9: 36.57 – 36.68 Mb	Chr 4: 44.3 – 44.36 Mb
PubMed search
- Wikidata
View/Edit Human	View/Edit Mouse

Maternal embryonic leucine zipper kinase (MELK) is an enzyme that in humans is encoded by the MELK gene. MELK is a serine/threonine kinase belonging to the family of AMPK/Snf1 protein kinases. MELK was first identified present as maternal mRNA in mouse embryos. MELK expression is elevated in a number of cancers and is an active research target for pharmacological inhibition.

MELK was previously believed to be essential for cancer cell proliferation. However, recent research using CRISPR has demonstrated that MELK is fully dispensable for cancer cell growth, casting doubt on the rationale for targeting this protein in patients. The results are dependent on the experimental design. Therefore, there is a need for further research.

== Interactions ==
MELK has been shown to interact with CDC25B.
