= RNF7 =

Protein-coding gene in the species Homo sapiens

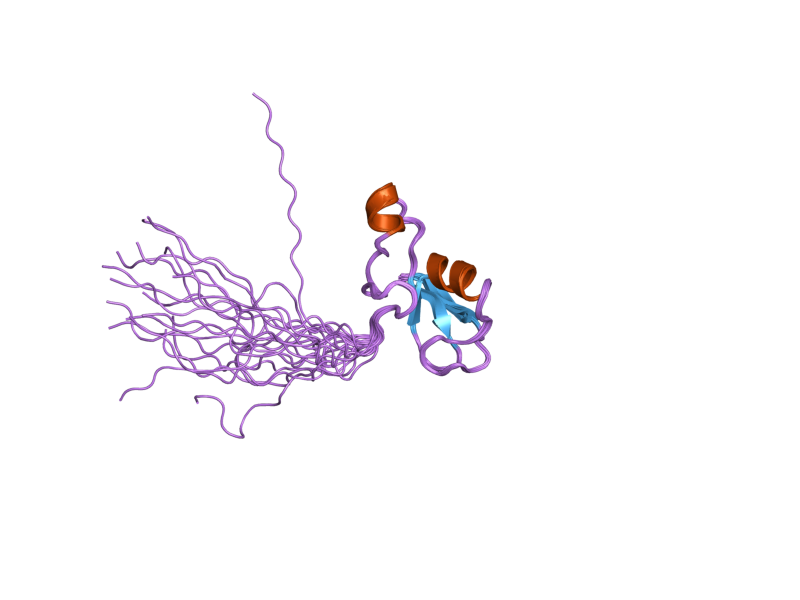

Identifiers
- Aliases: RNF7, CKBBP1, ROC2, SAG, ring finger protein 7, rbx2
- External IDs: OMIM: 603863; MGI: 1337096; GeneCards: RNF7
Available structures
PDB	Ortholog search: PDBe RCSB
PDB	List of PDB id codes 2ECL
Enzyme activity
EC #	BRENDA	ExPASy	KEGG	MetaCyc
2.3.2.27	↗	↗	↗	↗
2.3.2.32	↗	↗	↗	↗

Gene location (Human)
Chr.	Chromosome 3 (human)
Band	3q23	Start	141,738,249 bp
Band	3q23	End	141,747,560 bp

Gene location (Mouse)
Chr.	Chromosome 9 (mouse)
Band	9|9 E3.3	Start	96,352,990 bp
Band	9|9 E3.3	End	96,360,728 bp
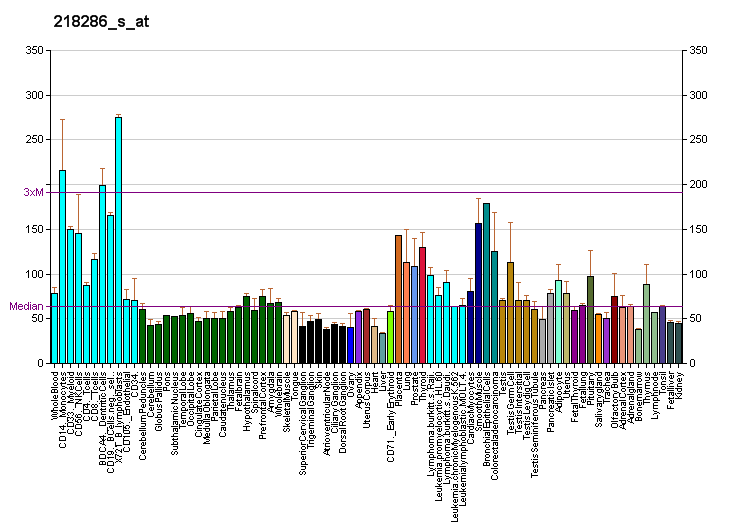
RNA expression pattern
Bgee	Human / Mouse (ortholog); Top expressed in: left adrenal gland; left adrenal cortex; right adrenal gland; right adrenal cortex; right testis; muscle layer of sigmoid colon; left testis; anterior pituitary; body of pancreas; muscle of thigh / Top expressed in: Epithelium of choroid plexus; ureter; morula; morula; iris; median eminence; gastrula; supraoptic nucleus; epithelium of lens; vestibular membrane of cochlear duct; More reference expression data
BioGPS	More reference expression data
Gene ontology
Molecular function	protein binding; zinc ion binding; copper ion binding; cullin family protein binding; metal ion binding; NEDD8 transferase activity; ubiquitin protein ligase activity
Cellular component	nucleoplasm; nucleus; Cul5-RING ubiquitin ligase complex; cytoplasm; cytosol; Cul2-RING ubiquitin ligase complex; Cul3-RING ubiquitin ligase complex; Cul7-RING ubiquitin ligase complex; nuclear SCF ubiquitin ligase complex; Cul4-RING E3 ubiquitin ligase complex; cullin-RING ubiquitin ligase complex
Biological process	response to redox state; protein ubiquitination; protein neddylation; post-translational protein modification; SCF-dependent proteasomal ubiquitin-dependent protein catabolic process; ubiquitin-dependent protein catabolic process
Sources:Amigo / QuickGO
Orthologs
Databases	NCBI: entry; OMA: entry
Species	Human	Mouse
Entrez	9616	19823
Ensembl	ENSG00000114125	ENSMUSG00000051234
UniProt	Q9UBF6	Q9WTZ1
RefSeq (mRNA)	NM_001201370; NM_014245; NM_183063; NM_183237	NM_011279; NM_001311135
RefSeq (protein)	NP_001188299; NP_055060; NP_899060	NP_001298064; NP_035409
Location (UCSC)	Chr 3: 141.74 – 141.75 Mb	Chr 9: 96.35 – 96.36 Mb
PubMed search
- Wikidata
View/Edit Human	View/Edit Mouse

RING-box protein 2 is a protein that in humans is encoded by the RNF7 gene.

The protein encoded by this gene is a highly conserved ring finger protein. It is an essential subunit of SKP1-cullin/CDC53-F box protein ubiquitin ligases, which are a part of the protein degradation machinery important for cell cycle progression and signal transduction. This protein interacts with, and is a substrate of, casein kinase II (CSNK2A1/CKII). The phosphorylation of this protein by CSNK2A1 has been shown to promote the degradation of IkappaBalpha (CHUK/IKK-alpha/IKBKA) and p27^{Kip1}(CDKN1B). Alternatively spliced transcript variants encoding distinct isoforms have been reported.

== Interactions ==
RNF7 has been shown to interact with CSNK2B.

== See also ==
- RING finger domain
