= CSNK2B =

Protein-coding gene in humans

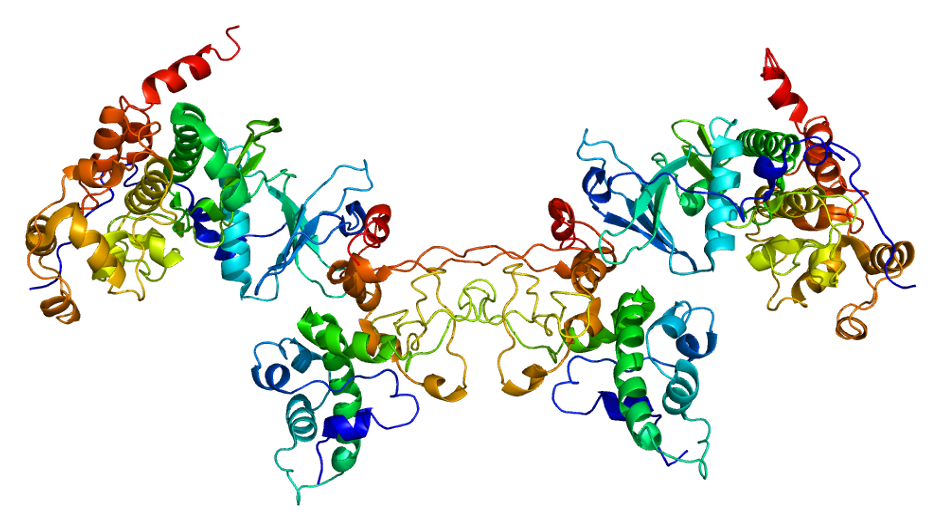

Identifiers
- Aliases: CSNK2B, CK2B, CK2N, CSK2B, G5A, casein kinase 2 beta, Ckb2, Ckb1, POBINDS
- External IDs: OMIM: 115441; MGI: 88548; GeneCards: CSNK2B
Available structures
PDB	Ortholog search: PDBe RCSB
PDB	List of PDB id codes 1DS5, 1JWH, 1QF8, 3EED, 4DGL, 4MD7, 4MD8, 4MD9, 4NH1, 2R6M

Gene location (Human)
Chr.	Chromosome 6 (human)
Band	6p21.33	Start	31,665,227 bp
Band	6p21.33	End	31,670,343 bp

Gene location (Mouse)
Chr.	Chromosome 17 (mouse)
Band	17 B1|17 18.59 cM	Start	35,335,172 bp
Band	17 B1|17 18.59 cM	End	35,341,029 bp
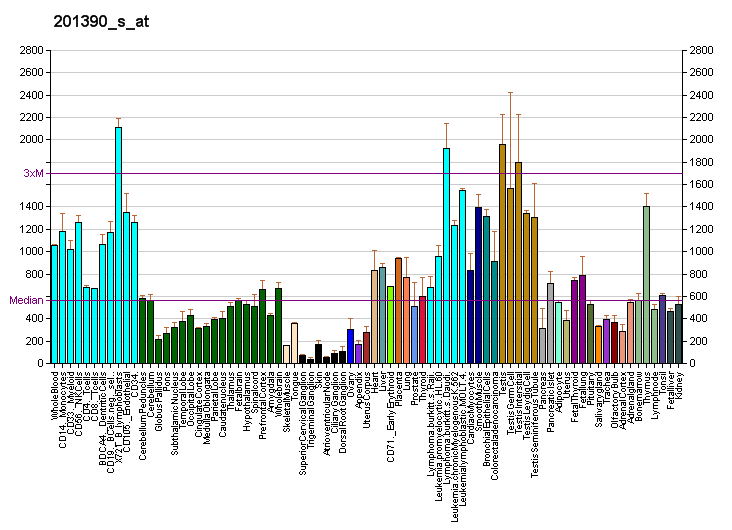
RNA expression pattern
Bgee	Human / Mouse (ortholog); Top expressed in: left testis; right testis; skin of leg; skin of abdomen; ganglionic eminence; left ovary; stromal cell of endometrium; mucosa of transverse colon; right ovary; canal of the cervix / Top expressed in: spermatid; seminiferous tubule; spermatocyte; lip; ventricular zone; embryo; esophagus; morula; muscle of thigh; somite; More reference expression data
BioGPS	More reference expression data
Gene ontology
Molecular function	protein domain specific binding; transcription factor binding; chromatin binding; metal ion binding; protein binding; protein kinase regulator activity; identical protein binding; signaling receptor binding; ribonucleoprotein complex binding; protein serine/threonine kinase activity
Cellular component	cytosol; PcG protein complex; extracellular exosome; nucleoplasm; chromatin; extracellular region; nucleus; cytoplasm; plasma membrane; cilium; nuclear matrix; secretory granule lumen; cell projection; ficolin-1-rich granule lumen; protein kinase CK2 complex
Biological process	regulation of DNA binding; negative regulation of blood vessel endothelial cell migration; endothelial tube morphogenesis; positive regulation of pathway-restricted SMAD protein phosphorylation; Wnt signaling pathway; adiponectin-activated signaling pathway; positive regulation of activin receptor signaling pathway; signal transduction; negative regulation of cell population proliferation; protein folding; regulation of signal transduction by p53 class mediator; regulation of protein kinase activity; phosphatidylcholine biosynthetic process; response to testosterone; neutrophil degranulation; liver regeneration; macroautophagy; peptidyl-threonine phosphorylation
Sources:Amigo / QuickGO
Orthologs
Databases	NCBI: entry; OMA: entry
Species	Human	Mouse
Entrez	1460	13001
Ensembl	ENSG00000228875; ENSG00000204435; ENSG00000232960; ENSG00000206406; ENSG00000224774 ENSG00000230700; ENSG00000224398	ENSMUSG00000024387
UniProt	P67870	P67871
RefSeq (mRNA)	NM_001320; NM_001282385	NM_009975; NM_001303445; NM_001303446; NM_001303476
RefSeq (protein)	NP_001269314; NP_001311	NP_001290374; NP_001290375; NP_001290405; NP_034105
Location (UCSC)	Chr 6: 31.67 – 31.67 Mb	Chr 17: 35.34 – 35.34 Mb
PubMed search
- Wikidata
View/Edit Human	View/Edit Mouse

Casein kinase II regulatory subunit
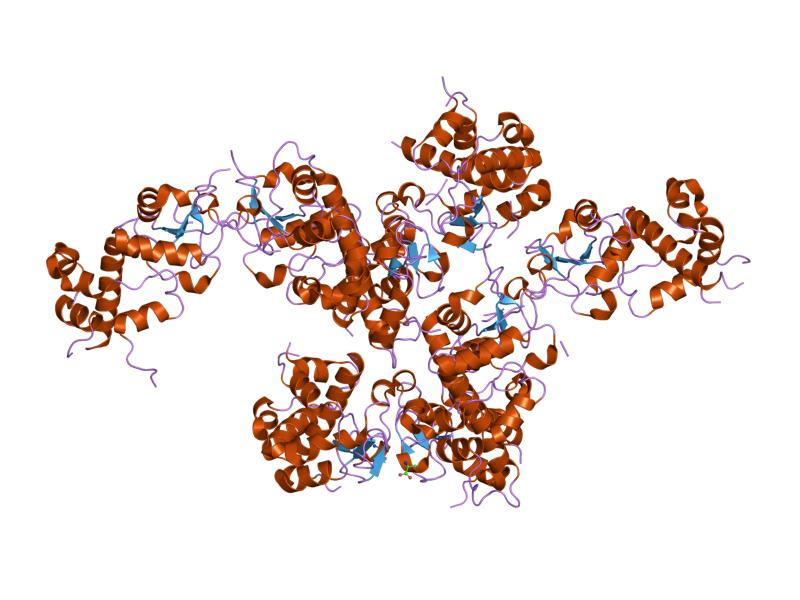
- structure of ck2 beta subunit crystallized in the presence of a p21waf1 peptide

Identifiers
- Symbol: CK_II_beta
- Pfam: PF01214
- InterPro: IPR000704
- PROSITE: PDOC00845
- SCOP2: 1qf8 / SCOPe / SUPFAM
Available protein structures:
- PDB: IPR000704 PF01214 (ECOD; PDBsum)
- AlphaFold: IPR000704; PF01214

Casein kinase II subunit beta is a protein that in humans is encoded by the CSNK2B gene. It is a ubiquitous protein kinase which regulates metabolic pathways, signal transduction, transcription, translation, and replication. The enzyme localizes to the endoplasmic reticulum and the Golgi apparatus.

Casein kinase, a ubiquitous, well-conserved protein kinase involved in cell metabolism and differentiation, is characterised by its preference for Serine or Threonine in acidic stretches of amino acids. The enzyme is a tetramer of 2 alpha- and 2 beta-subunits. However, some species (e.g., mammals) possess 2 related forms of the alpha-subunit (alpha and alpha'), while others (e.g., fungi) possess 2 related beta-subunits (beta and beta'). The alpha-subunit is the catalytic unit and contains regions characteristic of serine/threonine protein kinases. The beta-subunit is believed to be regulatory, possessing an N-terminal auto-phosphorylation site, an internal acidic domain, and a potential metal-binding motif. The beta subunit is a highly conserved protein of about 25kDa that contains, in its central section, a cysteine-rich motif, CX(n)C, that could be involved in binding a metal such as zinc. The mammalian beta-subunit gene promoter shares common features with those of other mammalian protein kinases and is closely related to the promoter of the regulatory subunit of cAMP-dependent protein kinase.

== Interactions ==
CSNK2B has been shown to interact with CD163, CSNK2A2, Casein kinase 2, alpha 1, FGF1, TRIB3, CDC34, Ribosomal protein L5, BTF3, BRCA1, RNF7, P70-S6 Kinase 1 and APC.
