= P27 cis-regulatory element =

p27 cis-regulatory element
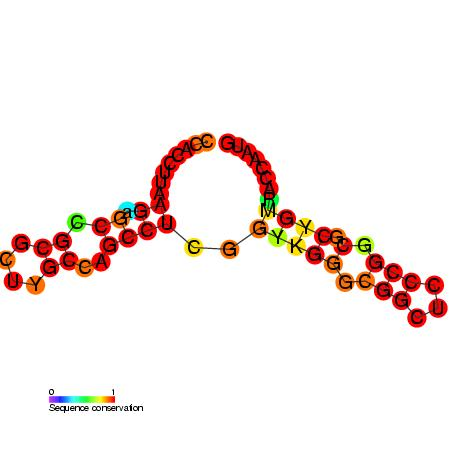
- Predicted secondary structure and sequence conservation of p27_CRE

Identifiers
- Symbol: p27_CRE
- Rfam: RF00454

Other data
- RNA type: Cis-reg
- Domain(s): Eukaryota
- SO: SO:0000204
- PDB structures: PDBe

The p27 cis-regulatory element is a structured G/C rich RNA element which is involved in controlling cell cycle regulated translation of the p27^{Kip1} protein in human cells.

The p27^{kip1} protein is involved in cell cycle regulation and belongs to the Cip/Kip family of cyclin dependent kinase(CDK)inhibitors. These inhibitors possess an N-terminal CDK-inhibitory domain which binds to the ATP binding pocket of the kinase and modulates its function.

This p27 cis-regulatory element is 114 nucleotides in length and is located at the very 5' end of the 5'UTR of the p27 mRNA. It contains a small open reading frame (ORF) of 29 amino acids which is preceded by and overlaps with a G/C-rich hairpin domain. This hairpin domain is predicted to form multiple stable stem loops with similar free energy. Both the open reading frame and the stem loop elements contribute to cell cycle-regulated translation of the p27 mRNA.

The structure of the G/C rich element appears to be important to its regulatory function as replacement of the G/C rich region with an unstructured sequence has a greater effect on regulation of translation than a simple deletion of part of the G/C rich region. It has been suggested that cell cycle specific binding proteins may favour one of the predicted structures in the G/C region thereby promoting conformational states which could regulate downstream translation.

This element was initially characterised in human cells but has predicted homologs in mice and chickens.
