= YWHAE =

Protein-coding gene in the species Homo sapiens

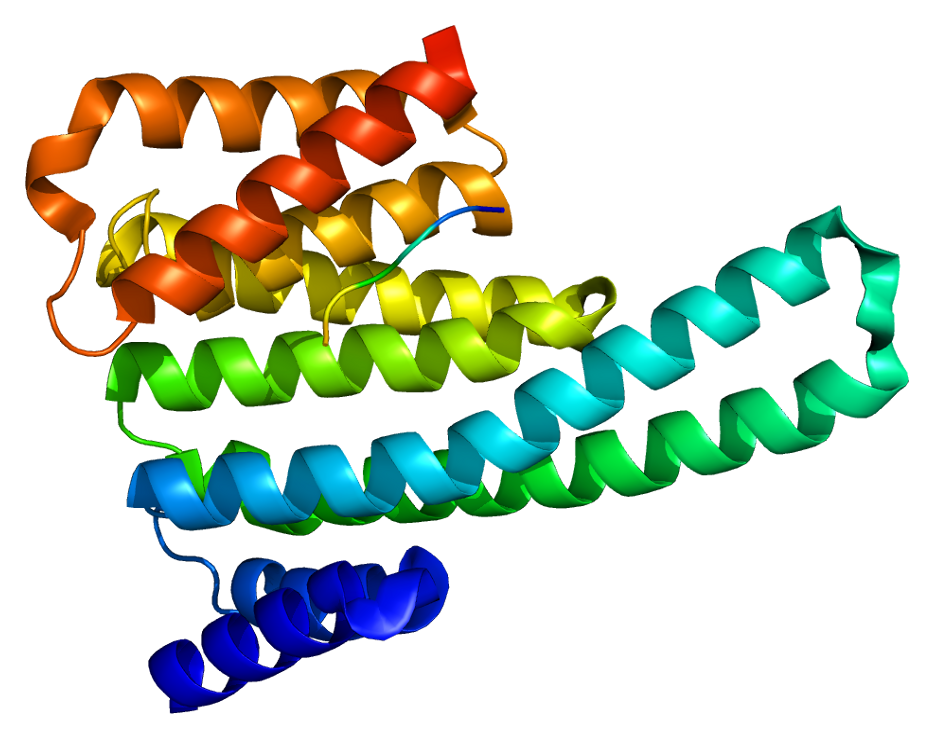
Available structures
PDB	Ortholog search: PDBe RCSB
PDB	List of PDB id codes 2BR9, 3UAL, 3UBW

Identifiers
- Aliases: YWHAE, 14-3-3E, HEL2, KCIP-1, MDCR, MDS, tyrosine 3-monooxygenase/tryptophan 5-monooxygenase activation protein epsilon
- External IDs: OMIM: 605066; MGI: 894689; HomoloGene: 100743; GeneCards: YWHAE; OMA:YWHAE - orthologs

Gene location (Human)
Chr.	Chromosome 17 (human)
Band	17p13.3	Start	1,344,275 bp
Band	17p13.3	End	1,400,222 bp

Gene location (Mouse)
Chr.	Chromosome 11 (mouse)
Band	11 B5|11 45.92 cM	Start	75,623,695 bp
Band	11 B5|11 45.92 cM	End	75,656,671 bp
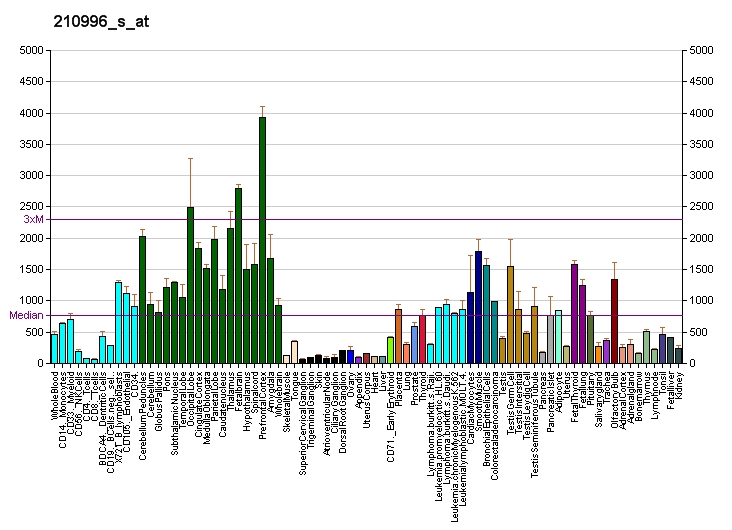

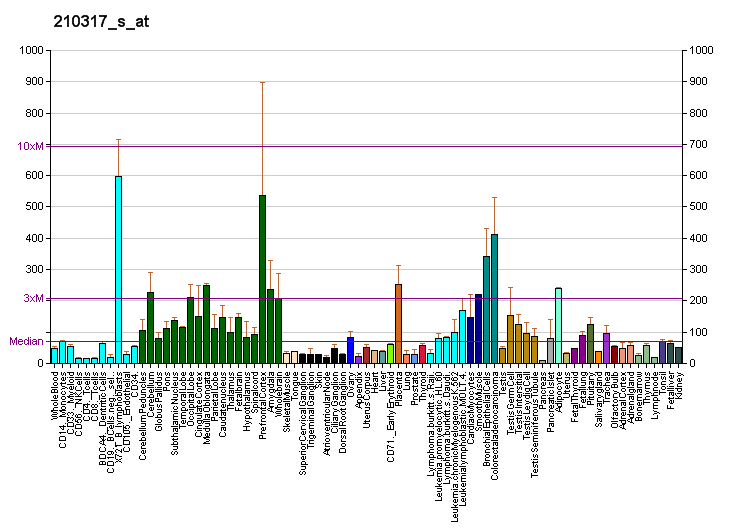
RNA expression pattern
Bgee	Human / Mouse (ortholog); Top expressed in: superior frontal gyrus; ventricular zone; primary visual cortex; prefrontal cortex; ganglionic eminence; corpus callosum; dorsolateral prefrontal cortex; Brodmann area 9; temporal lobe; amygdala / Top expressed in: somite; mandibular prominence; maxillary prominence; Gonadal ridge; habenula; dorsomedial hypothalamic nucleus; optic nerve; supraoptic nucleus; atrium; subiculum; More reference expression data
BioGPS	More reference expression data
Gene ontology
Molecular function	transmembrane transporter binding; protein domain specific binding; protein-containing complex binding; histone deacetylase binding; potassium channel regulator activity; phosphoprotein binding; protein binding; MHC class II protein complex binding; protein heterodimerization activity; enzyme binding; phosphoserine residue binding; ubiquitin protein ligase binding; cadherin binding involved in cell-cell adhesion; RNA binding; calcium channel regulator activity; identical protein binding; cadherin binding; scaffold protein binding
Cellular component	cytoplasm; cytosol; membrane; kinesin complex; focal adhesion; melanosome; axon; mitochondrion; extracellular exosome; cytoplasmic vesicle membrane; nucleus; plasma membrane; synapse; central region of growth cone; glutamatergic synapse
Biological process	protein targeting; negative regulation of protein dephosphorylation; intracellular signal transduction; substantia nigra development; neuron migration; negative regulation of peptidyl-serine dephosphorylation; hippo signaling; positive regulation of protein insertion into mitochondrial membrane involved in apoptotic signaling pathway; G2/M transition of mitotic cell cycle; regulation of heart rate by hormone; regulation of potassium ion transmembrane transporter activity; cerebral cortex development; regulation of cellular response to heat; regulation of membrane repolarization; membrane organization; viral process; regulation of heart rate by cardiac conduction; membrane repolarization during cardiac muscle cell action potential; hippocampus development; cell-cell adhesion; negative regulation of cysteine-type endopeptidase activity involved in apoptotic process; MAPK cascade; regulation of G2/M transition of mitotic cell cycle; protein localization to nucleus; cellular response to heat; positive regulation of protein export from nucleus; regulation of cytosolic calcium ion concentration; ciliary basal body-plasma membrane docking; regulation of postsynaptic membrane neurotransmitter receptor levels; negative regulation of calcium ion transmembrane transporter activity; negative regulation of calcium ion export across plasma membrane
Sources:Amigo / QuickGO
Orthologs
Species	Human	Mouse
Entrez	7531	22627
Ensembl	ENSG00000274474; ENSG00000108953	ENSMUSG00000020849
UniProt	P62258	P62259
RefSeq (mRNA)	NM_006761	NM_009536
RefSeq (protein)	NP_006752	NP_033562
Location (UCSC)	Chr 17: 1.34 – 1.4 Mb	Chr 11: 75.62 – 75.66 Mb
PubMed search
- Wikidata
View/Edit Human	View/Edit Mouse

14-3-3 protein epsilon is a protein that in humans is encoded by the YWHAE gene.

== Function ==
This gene product belongs to the 14-3-3 family of proteins which mediate signal transduction by binding to phosphoserine-containing proteins. This highly conserved protein family is found in both plants and mammals, and this protein is 100% identical to the mouse ortholog. It interacts with CDC25 phosphatases, RAF1 and IRS1 proteins, suggesting its role in diverse biochemical activities related to signal transduction, such as cell division and regulation of insulin sensitivity. It has also been implicated in the pathogenesis of small cell lung cancer, and microdeletions associated with Miller–Dieker syndrome.

== Interactions ==
YWHAE has been shown to interact with:

- C-Raf,
- CDC25B,
- HDAC4,
- kCNH2,
- IRS1 and
- IGF1R,
- MAP3K3,
- NDEL1,
- NGFRAP1, and
- TGF beta 1.

== See also ==
- 14-3-3 protein
