= BEX3 =

Protein-coding gene in humans

Identifiers
- Aliases: BEX3, Bex, DXS6984E, HGR74, NADE, NGFRAP1, brain expressed X-linked 3
- External IDs: OMIM: 300361; MGI: 1338016; GeneCards: BEX3
Available structures
PDB	Ortholog search: PDBe RCSB
PDB	List of PDB id codes 1SA6

Gene location (Human)
Chr.	X chromosome (human)
Band	Xq22.2	Start	103,376,395 bp
Band	Xq22.2	End	103,378,164 bp

Gene location (Mouse)
Chr.	X chromosome (mouse)
Band	X F1|X 57.64 cM	Start	135,171,002 bp
Band	X F1|X 57.64 cM	End	135,172,727 bp
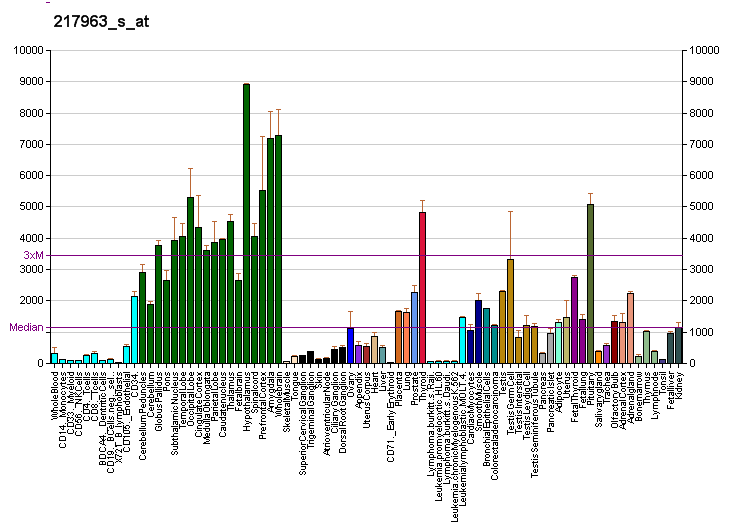
RNA expression pattern
Bgee	Human / Mouse (ortholog); Top expressed in: cerebellar vermis; pons; superior vestibular nucleus; middle temporal gyrus; Brodmann area 23; ventral tegmental area; renal medulla; lateral nuclear group of thalamus; pars compacta; pars reticulata / Top expressed in: yolk sac; somite; mandibular prominence; maxillary prominence; dentate gyrus of hippocampal formation granule cell; arcuate nucleus; supraoptic nucleus; central gray substance of midbrain; superior cervical ganglion; abdominal wall; More reference expression data
BioGPS	More reference expression data
Gene ontology
Molecular function	cysteine-type endopeptidase activator activity involved in apoptotic process; nerve growth factor receptor binding; death receptor binding; protein binding; metal ion binding; identical protein binding
Cellular component	cytoplasm; nucleus; cytosol
Biological process	multicellular organism development; activation of cysteine-type endopeptidase activity involved in apoptotic process; regulation of cysteine-type endopeptidase activity involved in apoptotic process; extrinsic apoptotic signaling pathway via death domain receptors; apoptotic process; negative regulation of cysteine-type endopeptidase activity involved in apoptotic process
Sources:Amigo / QuickGO
Orthologs
Databases	NCBI: entry; OMA: entry
Species	Human	Mouse
Entrez	27018	12070
Ensembl	ENSG00000166681	ENSMUSG00000046432
UniProt	Q00994	Q9WTZ9
RefSeq (mRNA)	NM_206917; NM_001282674; NM_014380; NM_206915	NM_001110233; NM_001110234; NM_009750
RefSeq (protein)	NP_001269603; NP_055195; NP_996798; NP_996800	NP_001103703; NP_001103704; NP_033880
Location (UCSC)	Chr X: 103.38 – 103.38 Mb	Chr X: 135.17 – 135.17 Mb
PubMed search
- Wikidata
View/Edit Human	View/Edit Mouse

Protein BEX3 is a protein that in humans is encoded by the BEX3 gene (previously NGFRAP1).

== Interactions ==
BEX3 has been shown to interact with YWHAE and Low affinity nerve growth factor receptor.
