= Casein kinase 2, alpha 1 =

Protein and coding gene in humans

CSNK2A1
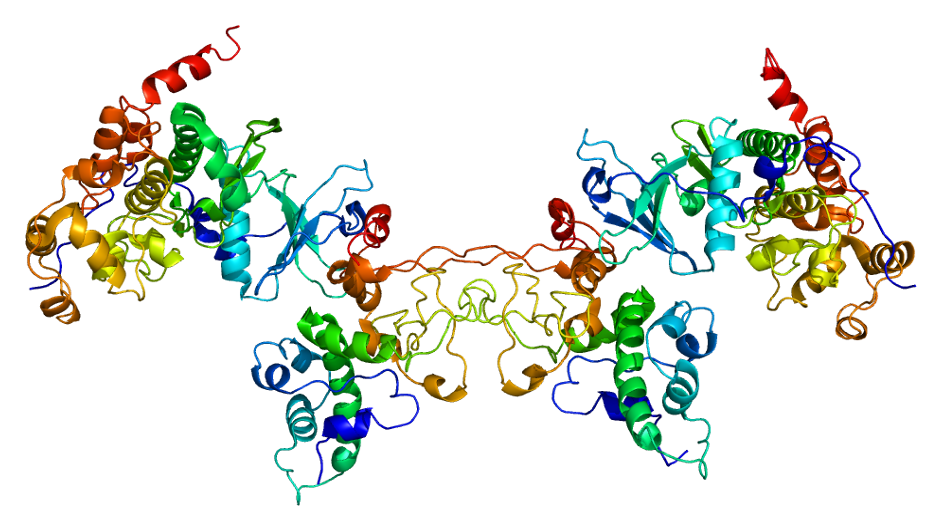

Identifiers
- Aliases: CSNK2A1, Csnk2a1, Csnk2a1-rs4, CK2A1, CKII, CSNK2A3, casein kinase 2 alpha 1, OCNDS, Cka1, Cka2
- External IDs: OMIM: 115440; MGI: 88543; GeneCards: CSNK2A1
Available structures
PDB	Ortholog search: PDBe RCSB
PDB	List of PDB id codes 1JWH, 1NA7, 1PJK, 2PVR, 2ZJW, 3AMY, 3AT2, 3AT3, 3AT4, 3AXW, 3BQC, 3C13, 3FWQ, 3H30, 3JUH, 3MB6, 3MB7, 3NGA, 3NSZ, 3OWJ, 3OWK, 3OWL, 3PE1, 3PE2, 3PE4, 3Q04, 3Q9W, 3Q9X, 3Q9Y, 3Q9Z, 3QA0, 3R0T, 3RPS, 3TAX, 3U4U, 3U87, 3U9C, 3W8L, 3WAR, 3WIK, 3WIL, 3WOW, 4DGL, 4FBX, 4GRB, 4GUB, 4GYW, 4GYY, 4GZ3, 4IB5, 4KWP, 4MD7, 4MD8, 4MD9, 4NH1, 4RLL, 4UB7, 4UBA, 5CQU, 5CQW, 5H8G, 5H8B, 5H8E, 5CLP, 5CSH, 5CVH, 5CS6, 5CU6, 5B0X
Enzyme activity
EC #	BRENDA	ExPASy	KEGG	MetaCyc
2.7.11.1	↗	↗	↗	↗

Gene location (Human)
Chr.	Chromosome 20 (human)
Band	20p13	Start	472,498 bp
Band	20p13	End	543,835 bp

Gene location (Mouse)
Chr.	Chromosome 2 (mouse)
Band	2|2 G3	Start	152,068,759 bp
Band	2|2 G3	End	152,123,772 bp
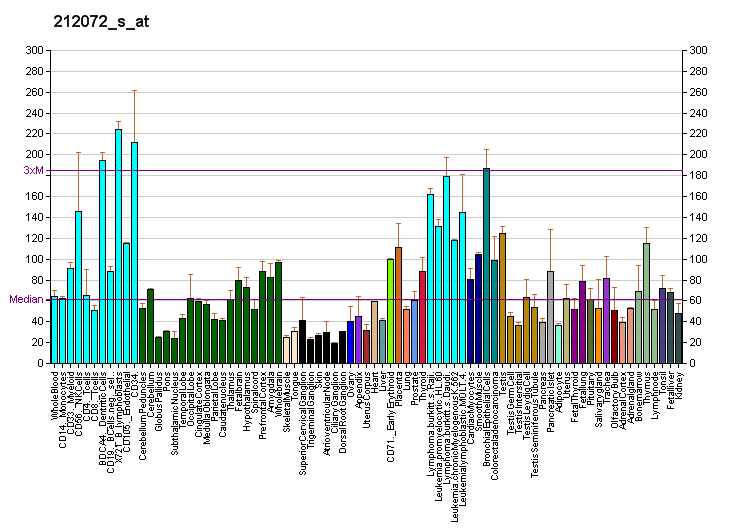

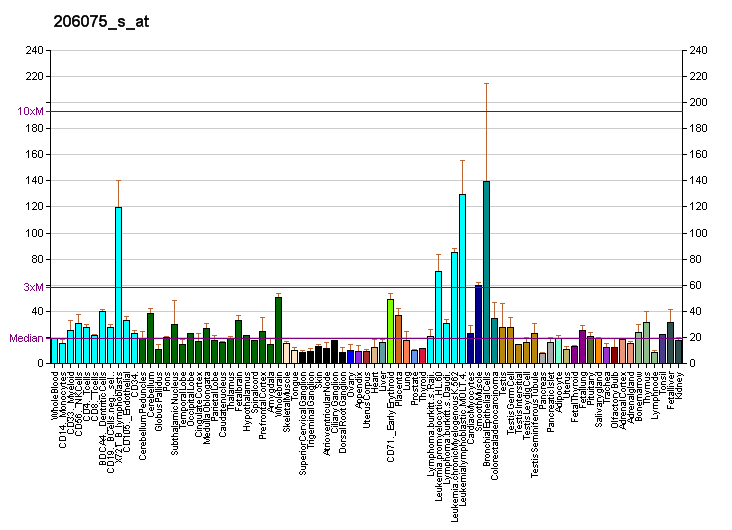

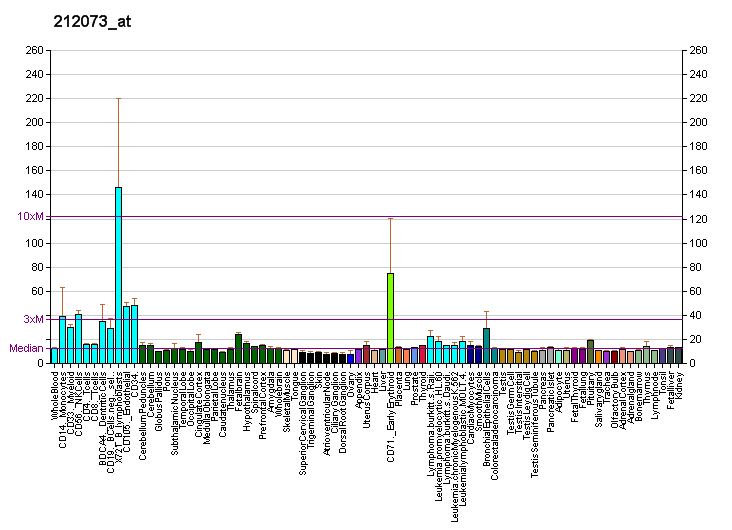
RNA expression pattern
Bgee	Human / Mouse (ortholog); Top expressed in: ganglionic eminence; ventricular zone; epithelium of colon; gingival epithelium; Achilles tendon; islet of Langerhans; rectum; stromal cell of endometrium; gastrocnemius muscle; amniotic fluid / Top expressed in: genital tubercle; tail of embryo; lumbar spinal ganglion; ventricular zone; zygote; epiblast; blastocyst; muscle of thigh; ganglionic eminence; extensor digitorum longus muscle; More reference expression data
BioGPS	More reference expression data
Gene ontology
Molecular function	transferase activity; nucleotide binding; Hsp90 protein binding; protein kinase activity; protein N-terminus binding; protein serine/threonine kinase activity; protein binding; ATP binding; kinase activity; beta-catenin binding; protein phosphatase regulator activity; ribonucleoprotein complex binding; identical protein binding
Cellular component	NuRD complex; cytosol; Sin3 complex; PcG protein complex; nucleus; nucleoplasm; protein kinase CK2 complex; chromatin; cytoplasm; plasma membrane
Biological process	chaperone-mediated protein folding; negative regulation of cysteine-type endopeptidase activity involved in apoptotic process; regulation of transcription, DNA-templated; positive regulation of protein catabolic process; phosphorylation; rhythmic process; Wnt signaling pathway; transcription, DNA-templated; positive regulation of Wnt signaling pathway; protein phosphorylation; positive regulation of cell growth; positive regulation of cell population proliferation; cell cycle; signal transduction; apoptotic process; regulation of signal transduction by p53 class mediator; protein folding; phosphatidylcholine biosynthetic process; macroautophagy; peptidyl-threonine phosphorylation; cerebral cortex development; response to testosterone; protein autophosphorylation; liver regeneration; regulation of protein localization to plasma membrane; regulation of chromosome separation; peptidyl-serine phosphorylation; negative regulation of ubiquitin-dependent protein catabolic process; negative regulation of apoptotic signaling pathway
Sources:Amigo / QuickGO
Orthologs
Databases	NCBI: entry; OMA: entry
Species	Human	Mouse
Entrez	1457	12995
Ensembl	ENSG00000101266	ENSMUSG00000074698
UniProt	P68400; Q5U5J2	Q60737
RefSeq (mRNA)	NM_001895; NM_177559; NM_177560; NM_001362770; NM_001362771	NM_007788
RefSeq (protein)	NP_001886; NP_808227; NP_808228; NP_001349699; NP_001349700	NP_031814
Location (UCSC)	Chr 20: 0.47 – 0.54 Mb	Chr 2: 152.07 – 152.12 Mb
PubMed search
- Wikidata
View/Edit Human	View/Edit Mouse

Casein kinase II subunit alpha 1 (CK2α) is an enzyme that in humans is encoded by the CSNK2A1 gene, located on chromosome 20.

CK2α is the alpha catalytic subunit of Casein kinase II (CK2). CK2 is a serine/threonine protein kinase that phosphorylates acidic proteins such as casein. The kinase exists in monomeric form and as a tetramer and is composed of two α or α' (alpha prime) subunits and two β subunits; the CK2 holoenzyme has α2β2 stoichiometry. The alpha subunits contain the catalytic activity while the beta subunits undergo autophosphorylation. The protein encoded by this gene represents the alpha subunit. Three transcript variants encoding two different proteins have been found for this gene. CK2α' paralog is encoded by the CSNK2A2 gene; it differs in the length and sequence of the C-terminus of the protein.

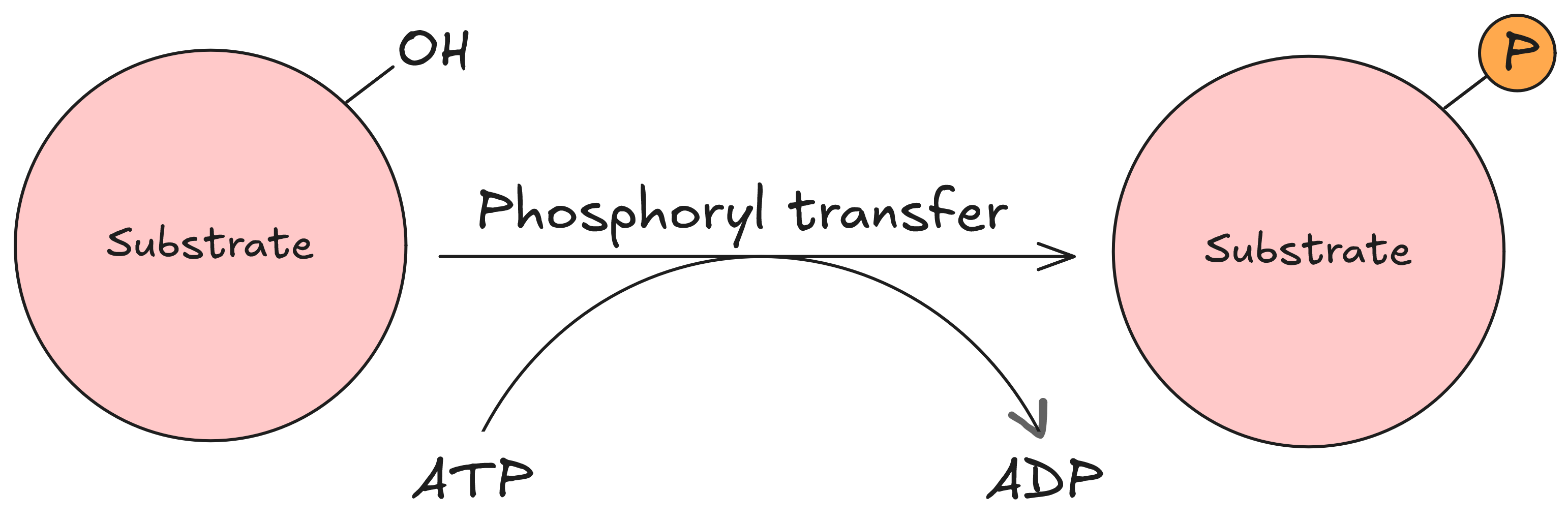
Protein Kinase Phosphoryl transfer

== Gene location ==
The CSNK2A1 gene is located on chromosome 20 in humans. In 2025, analyses revealed that CSNK2A1 has 14 exons (rather than 13 exons as previously reported). Protein translation begins 110 nucleotides into exon 3; exons 1 and 2 are entirely untranslated. CSNK2A1 mRNA contains 12,984 nucleotides (coding sequence is 1,176 nucleotides), spanning approximately 71 kb. CSNK2A1 contains 391 amino acids.

== Function ==
CK2α has been implicated in many diseases including cancer, autoimmune disorders, COVID-19, psychiatric disorders, ophthalmic diseases, obesity, diabetes, cardiovascular disorders, neurological disorders, and most recently, Okur-Chung Neurodevelopmental Syndrome (OCNDS). It has roles in cell cycle progression, viral infection, apoptosis, transcription, and regulating circadian rhythms.

CSNK2A1 contains highly conserved functional domains, including a glycine-rich loop, which is a critical structure common to kinases that has roles in substrate recognition, enzyme catalysis, and nucleotide binding. While both alpha isoforms (α, α') are present in major brain regions, there is a predominance of CK2α over CK2α' in the mammalian brain at an approximate ratio of CK2α:CK2α' as 8:1.

== Clinical significance ==
Mutations in CSNK2A1 are causative for Okur-Chung Neurodevelopmental Syndrome (OCNDS). There are "hot spots" where mutations are more likely to occur, with ~33% of individuals with OCNDS harboring the same genetic change: p. Lys198R

== Interactions ==
More than one-third of CK2 protein substrates are implicated in gene expression and protein synthesis as either transcription factors, translational elements, or effectors of DNA/RNA structure. Casein kinase 2, alpha 1 has been shown to interact with:

- APC,
- ATF1,
- ATF2,
- C-Fos,
- C-jun,
- CDC25B,
- CHEK1,
- CREBBP,
- CSNK2B,
- DDIT3,
- FGF1,
- FGF2,
- HNRPA2B1
- MAPK14,
- PIN1,
- PLEKHO1,
- PTEN,
- RELA,
- TAF1, and
- UBTF.
